= Zephany Nurse =

South African abductee (born 1997)

- Born: Zephany Nurse; 28 April 1997 (age 29); Cape Town, South Africa
- Disappeared: 30 April 1997; Groote Schuur Hospital
- Status: Found (February 2015)
- Other name: Miché Solomon
- Parent(s): Morne Nurse (father); Celeste Nurse (mother)

Miché Solomon (born Zephany Nurse, 28 April 1997) is a South African woman who was abducted from Groote Schuur Hospital in Cape Town, South Africa on 30 April 1997, when she was two days old. Nurse was reunited with her biological parents, Morne and Celeste Nurse, 17 years later, after DNA tests confirmed her identity.

After the ban on publication of her legal name was lifted, Zephany announced that her book titled Zephany: Two mothers, one daughter, an astonishing true story would be published. Miché Solomon, as she is now called, dedicated the book to both mothers. Her kidnapper was identified as Lavona Solomon, and in August 2016 she was sentenced to 10 years in prison.

Miché struggled to form a relationship with her biological family, and after turning 18, as her biological parents were then divorced, she chose to move back in with the father she had grown up with, who had been absolved of any involvement in her kidnapping. She chose to keep the name that she was raised with, and says she has forgiven Lavona and regularly visited her while she was in prison. Lavona Solomon was released from prison on parole on 18 August 2023.

== Kidnapping ==
Celeste Nurse delivered Zephany on 28 April 1997 by caesarean section in the Groote Schuur Hospital, Cape Town, South Africa. Celeste described a person in a nurse's uniform comforting her while her baby was still in the nearby cot, before falling asleep. When Celeste had woken up, a nurse kept asking her where the baby was, and at this point she realized that Zephany had been taken. The hospital contacted the police for assistance in searching the hospital; however, only a few untraceable items were found, including Zephany's baby nest, a baby garment, and a handbag with no identifiable items. A pillow was found in a tunnel that was intended to provide direct access from the street to the ward for women in labour. The tunnel also provided access to the old main building, psychiatric department and out-patient section, which at the time had unrestricted access.

The Nurse family believe the kidnapper took precautions to move through the ward unnoticed. The pillow was probably used to fake a pregnancy, as no one would question a pregnant woman moving around in a maternity ward. The woman, now dressed as a nurse in maroon pants and oatmeal top, made an effort to befriend the mothers in the ward. One of the expectant mothers, who remembered the kidnapper's face, had spoken to her briefly. On another occasion, this same mother found her holding her baby, and when questioned the woman replied that the baby had been crying and she was comforting it. In a later interview, Celeste Nurse said: "Her intention was to steal a child, she didn't care which child it was." Five days after Zephany's birth, the Nurse family went home without their daughter.

== Search ==
Celeste Nurse clung to the hope that what happened was not real, or a kind of sick joke and that someone would bring her daughter. "We came home to nothing." Every year since the kidnapping, the Nurse family would celebrate Zephany's birthday on 28 April, in an attempt to keep the search for her in the media. Celeste has also given a number of interviews, many at times when other kidnappings have occurred, always offering support to the affected families.

In at least two instances the Nurse family were given hope that their daughter would be returned home. One woman, whose neighbors had not noticed her pregnancy, was investigated by the police, but, while the child closely resembled the missing Zephany, it was a boy. In another instance, after almost 12 years of no news, in July 2009, the Nurses received a phone call in which a woman whispered, "I know about your daughter," and asked for 500,000 South African Rand (approx US$70,000 in 2009) to be delivered at a prearranged place. Police were contacted, and the drop off monitored, but no one arrived to collect the money. The call was later traced to Glenda Doubell, a neighbor of Celeste Nurse's mother, who was charged with extortion and was given 3 years house arrest, ZAR 5,000 fine and 600 hours community service.

== Finding Zephany ==
In January 2015, the Nurses' second daughter, Cassidy Nurse, started at a new school where Zephany, then aged seventeen, coincidentally was also in attendance under the name Miché Solomon. Friends of Zephany commented on the uncanny resemblance between the two girls, and despite their 4-year age difference, they formed an almost immediate friendship. Once Morne Nurse heard about the physical similarities between the two girls, he arranged with Cassidy to meet Zephany at a local takeaway. After this first meeting, Morne contacted the investigating officer in the disappearance of Zephany.

The police began an investigation, and after Zephany's purported parents could not provide proof of her birth, DNA tests were conducted. The results were conclusive that Zephany was the Nurses' child, and she was removed to a place of safety by the Department of Social Services. The Nurse family were granted visitations, and apparently Zephany was already calling them "mother" and "father" at this time.

In March 2016, a woman, who was not named for legal reasons, but later identified as Lavona Solomon, was convicted of the abduction. In her plea, Solomon said that she had been desperate for a child after numerous miscarriages and attempts to conceive; she said that another woman had offered her Zephany, claiming that the baby's mother did not want her, and that she had paid R3‚000 in adoption fees. In August 2016, she was sentenced to 10 years in prison; her name was still withheld at the time "to protect the identity she gave to [the] baby."

== Identity revealed ==
After her identity as Zephany Nurse had been kept a secret for five years, she applied for the lifting of the ban restricting the publication of her legal name Miché Solomon, and this was granted by the high court in Pretoria in 2019. Hours after the ban was lifted, Zephany announced that she would be publishing a book entitled Zephany: Two mothers, one daughter, an astonishing true story. She dedicated the book to both mothers. Her kidnapper was identified as Lavona Solomon.

Zephany struggled to form a relationship with her biological family, and after turning 18, she chose to move back in with the father she had grown up with, who had been absolved of any involvement in her kidnapping. She also chose to keep the name, Miché, that she had been raised with, and says she has forgiven Lavona and regularly visited her while she was in prison. Lavona Solomon was released from prison on parole on 18 August 2023.

== See also ==
- Abduction of Kamiyah Mobley
- Kidnapping of Carlina White
- List of kidnappings
- Lists of solved missing person cases
