= List of killings by law enforcement officers in the United States, April 2018 =

This is a list of people reported killed by non-military law enforcement officers in the United States in April 2018, whether in the line of duty or not, and regardless of reason or method. The listing documents the occurrence of a death, making no implications regarding wrongdoing or justification on the part of the person killed or officer involved. Killings are arranged by date of the incident that caused death. Different death dates, if known, are noted in the description. The table below lists 89 people.

== April 2018 ==
Date	Name and (age) of deceased	State (city)	Description
2018-04-30	Vigil Wolford (59)	Ohio (Columbus)	Police responding to a violence call found three stabbing victims, then found another a couple of blocks away. They found Wolford nearby, believed him to be the suspect, and confronted him, using a Taser before shooting him.
2018-04-29	Unidentified man	California (Redlands)	A police officer responding to a burglary call encountered and shot a man inside the home.
2018-04-29	Michael Scott Knibbs (47)	North Carolina (Franklin)	Sheriff's deputies responding to an argument between neighbors found one of the men, Knibbs, armed with a gun. Because he confronted the deputies, one of them shot him.
2018-04-29	Joshua Lee Ewing (26)	Iowa (Moorland)	A state trooper found a man and woman arguing at a rural roadside and stopped. The man pointed a handgun at the trooper and the two exchanged gunfire, killing the man.
2018-04-29	Brandon Busher (38)	Louisiana (Shreveport)	Outside a casino, a police officer noticed Busher, who had previously been banned from the establishment. The officer chased Busher, they fought, and Busher was shot when he tried to take the officer's gun.
2018-04-28	Unidentified man	Colorado (Northglenn)	Police seeking a suspect found him outside a store; when he displayed a gun they shot him.
2018-04-28	Shukri Said (36)	Georgia (Atlanta)	Said's family dialed 911 to report she had armed herself with a knife and was suffering mental health problems; the Somali-US citizen had schizophrenia and bipolar disorder. When police arrived, Said was wielding a knife; officers fatally shot her after non-lethal weapons failed to get her to drop the weapon. Her family said via a lawyer they felt her use of a headscarf may have led to the severity of force used but acknowledged an investigation may find police acted appropriately.
2018-04-28	Nolberto Hernandez Leon (26)	California (Elk Grove)	Police responded to a call about shots fired in the early hours at a hotel. When they arrived, they found Hernandez Leon armed in a hotel hallway. Hernandez Leon shot himself, then fired at the officers, who returned fire.
2018-04-28	Joseph L. Hoffman (41)	Florida (Casselberry)	Police were called to a scene where a man was firing a gun. When they arrived, Hoffman shot at them, and they returned fire killing him.
2018-04-26	Myra Lisa Micalizio (56)	California (Palermo)	Responding to a report that a woman was causing making threats, sheriff's deputies arrived to find Micalizio in her car in a stranger's driveway. She backed her car toward the deputies and they shot her.
2018-04-26	Anthony Lamar Carter (22)	Texas (Vernon)	Police were on the lookout for Carter as the suspect in a kidnapping. Officers saw his car in Burkburnett, Texas, pursued him, and disabled the car with spike strips. When the car crashed, the female victim jumped out; Carter also got out and attacked her. Officers shot him as he was stabbing her.
2018-04-25	Jese Paul Schlegel (41)	Colorado (Colorado Springs)	Police received a report of a burglary just after 6 am at a print shop. They arrived and chased the suspect; when Schlegel pointed a gun at a bystander, police shot him.
2018-04-25	Isaac Jackson (42)	Kentucky (Louisville)	On a domestic disturbance call, police entered a home and found Jackson armed with knives. When he injured an officer with a knife, another officer shot him.
2018-04-25	Charles Boeh (36)	Colorado (Denver)	Police spotted Boeh, who was wanted on several robbery charges, while he was driving. After a car chase, Boeh brandished a gun, and officers shot him.
2018-04-24	Unidentified man	Texas (Amarillo)	Police responded to a report of a man armed with a gun, suffering from a mental health emergency. The man came out of his house and fired a shot, then went back inside and fired a few more while SWAT officers were brought out. When the man came outside again and brandished the gun, police shot him.
2018-04-24	Unidentified man	Texas (San Antonio)	Hotel employees confronted a man who was trying to enter guest rooms. He avoided them and made his way up through the floors of the hotel, trying to get into a couple of rooms at gunpoint. About an hour after the initial confrontation, police found the suspect on the seventh floor and shot him when he displayed a gun.
2018-04-24	Demonjhea Jordan (27)	Kentucky (Louisville)	A phone store reported being robbed. A police officer found Jordan, who fit the suspect description, nearby and chased him. Reports said gunfire was "exchanged", and Jordan was killed.
2018-04-22	Miguel Escalona Vivas (37)	Kentucky (Louisville)	Witnesses saw Vivas armed and fighting with another man, and alerted police officers who were nearby. Police chased Vivas and shot him. The other man was also shot but reports did not indicate whether by Vivas or by police.
2018-04-22	Matthew Hartman (27)	Michigan (West Olive)	Family members reported that Hartman might be a danger to his wife. Officers came to their home and found Hartman outside with a gun; Hartman went inside, then came back out holding the gun to his wife's head. Officers killed him. It is also believed that Hartman shot two other people earlier that day, killing one of them.
2018-04-21	Timothy Wayne Anderson (48)	Iowa (Boone)	A woman reported that her boyfriend, Anderson, was threatening her and her mother with a knife. When officers arrived, Anderson came outside at them and refused to drop the knife.
2018-04-21	Terrence Carlton (25)	Tennessee (Memphis)	After a pair of late-night shootings, police spotted Carlton, who fit the description of the shooting suspect. During a foot chase, Carlton fell; as he got up, he "simultaneously reached for his waist and made a statement threatening the officer's life", when an officer shot him.
2018-04-20	Matthew G. Brown (18)	Illinois (Mackinaw)	Police responded to a report of a man trying to break in. On arriving, Brown pointed a gun at them.
2018-04-20	Lockwood Adrian Gibson (49)	California (Foresthill)	911 calls reported Gibson driving recklessly -- across the center line, through red lights, and bumping other cars. Highway Patrol officers pursued him for quite some time before he crashed on city streets; they shot him there.
2018-04-20	James Bauduy (48)	Florida (Orlando)	Bauduy was wanted for murder and carjacking when sheriff's deputies located him. They approached and he did not comply with their orders; he made some motion that prompted the deputies to shoot him.
2018-04-18	Dytadious Mobley (31)	Florida (Fort Lauderdale)	Officials were seeking Mobley as a suspect in the murder of his mother-in-law. A US Marshals task force found him and ordered him out of his car. When Mobley fired a gun, several officers fired, killing him.
2018-04-18	Delorean Pikyavit (32)	Utah (Sugar House)	Police responding to a domestic disturbance call found Pikyavit in his front yard. Pikyavit went inside; after an hour of negotiation, he came back out and officers shot him.
2018-04-18	David Teneyuque (48)	Michigan (Pavilion Township)	The manager of a mobile home park called police, asking them to remove two people who were in a car on the property. Police found Teneyuque and a woman in the car and talked with them for about an hour when Teneyuque pointed a gun at them.
2018-04-17	Charles Whitley (40)	Kentucky (Cumberland County)	Sheriff's deputies tried to make a traffic stop on Whitley, but he drove off. During the chase, a deputy shot at Whitley's car, hitting him and apparently causing a crash. Whitley died on the 19th.
2018-04-18	Justin Oakes (32)	Georgia (Douglasville)	Oakes walked into a sheriff's office seeking shelter. A couple of hours later, Oakes went into a restroom in the office, called 911, and claimed officers were trying to radiate or poison him. When deputies began to force their way into the restroom, Oakes stabbed one of them, and another deputy then shot him.
2018-04-18	William Ray Simcoe	Missouri (Greene County)	A sheriff's deputy tried to make a traffic stop on Simcoe, but Simcoe drove off. Eventually Simcoe stopped and got out of his car; he ran toward the deputy, pointing a gun and threatening, so the deputy shot him.
2018-04-17	Justin Monjay (39)	Oklahoma (Tishomingo)	Police and sheriff's deputies responded to a domestic disturbance. Monjay drove his car into the deputies' car, and one of the deputies shot him.
2018-04-17	Lonnie Marcel Bowen (41)	Utah (Magna)	Police received a 911 call, possibly made by Bowen, where the caller said he would kill his female hostage, demanding that police back off and negotiate. However, no hostage situation was in progress. Arriving at the location traced by the call, police found only a parked pickup truck. Later that day, they found from the license number that the truck's owner was wanted; police in a nearby city located the truck and pursued it. After they stopped the truck, which was being driven by Bowen, one of the officers shot him. (Two days earlier, Bowen had posted videos on Facebook saying police were out to kill him.)
2018-04-17	Sanchez Lowe (25)	Georgia (Austell)	Police patrolling a motel found a room with an open door; they smelled marijuana and saw paraphernalia and radioed to get a warrant. While they waited outside, Lowe left the motel room and got in a car. As he tried to drive away, an officer who was stuck in the window of the car shot him.
2018-04-15	Ruben Stewart (36)	Montana (Lodge Grass)	Stewart's grandmother called police, reporting that he was drunk and asking them to remove him from her home. When officers from the Bureau of Indian Affairs arrived, Stewart came out of the house with a knife and one of the officers shot him.
2018-04-14	Jose Pietri (55)	New Jersey (Millville)	A man was found shot dead, a woman seriously injured, and two children missing. Police sought Pietri, who was the father of the children. They found him, driving, later that evening; after a long chase, Pietri stopped and got out, and police shot him.
2018-04-14	Andre Lavance Rippy (39)	Arizona (Phoenix)	Police received reports of shots fired, then found Rippy driving a vehicle thought to be involved. He would not stop and led police on a long chase. At one point he did stop and tried to carjack another vehicle, in the process pointing a gun at officers. When Rippy finally did steal a third vehicle, the chase continued; and when it ended and Rippy got out, officers shot him.
2018-04-14	Jessie Thedford (32)	Georgia (Carrollton)	Thedford was arrested for possession of meth. He was handcuffed and put in the back seat of a patrol car. He managed to get his hands in front of himself and crawl over into the driver's seat. Thedford drove the car at officers, who shot him.
2018-04-14	Eduardo Andrade (44)	Arizona (Phoenix)	Police responded to a multicar accident with a suspected drunk driver. They found Andrade in one of the cars. Seeing a rifle in the car, they ordered Andrade to leave it alone; when he reached for the rifle, one of them shot at him. Andrade then returned fire with a handgun, and officers finally killed him.
2018-04-13	Kenneth Warren Resendez (34)	Texas (Waco)	Police received a call that Resendez was holding his family at knifepoint in their home. When they arrived, he refused to disarm or stand down, and they shot him.
2018-04-13	Bruce Arnold Allee (31)	Colorado (Thornton)	Allee stole a car, shooting one of the owners. That car was found later and, in a search of the area, police found and killed Allee. (It was found that US marshals were seeking Allee, to arrest him on outstanding warrants.)
2018-04-12	Dashaun Shepard	Georgia (Atlanta)	Police received 911 calls about shots fired, and when they responded Shepard began shooting at them. Police surrounded the house; during the all-night standoff, Shepard communicated with family by text and posted on Facebook Live. When Shepard finally came out (apparently because of police gas canisters), he refused to surrender and police shot him.
2018-04-12	Benjamin Evans (23)	Minnesota (Lake Elmo)	Evans was reported to be in an intersection, armed and suicidal. Police were unable to convince him to surrender -- including the use of nonlethal weapons -- and eventually shot him.
2018-04-12	Rumondale Jones (39)	Arkansas (Helena-West Helena)	Jones was reported to be outside his daughter's home, assaulting her. When police arrived, he was stabbing her (she died at the scene), then lunged at an officer, who shot him. It was later found that Jones had stabbed his mother inside the house; she survived.
2018-04-12	Steven Brooks (45)	Pennsylvania (Washington)	Brooks was wanted for a murder in Florida; police found him in Pennsylvania. After a car chase and then foot chase, Brooks turned toward officers with a handgun, and they shot him.
2018-04-12	Unidentified man	Colorado (Trinidad)	Police officers responding to a disturbance call found a large window broken out of the home. Inside, a man was holding a large piece of the glass; they ordered him to drop it but instead he advanced on the officers, and they shot him.
2018-04-12	Christopher Poer (46)	Colorado (Elizabeth)	Poer, a veteran with PTSD, called police believing he was being watched. When officers arrived, they found Poer in a field and picked up his gun from the ground. Officers then tased and punched Poer, causing him to fall unconscious. Poer later died at the hospital.
2018-04-11	Betty Lemoine (71)	Louisiana (Winn Parish)	Sheriff's deputies attempted to serve a warrant to arrest Kendall Lemoine at his home. Kendall and his mother, Betty Lemoine, were both standing outside a home, armed with guns. During a confrontation, officers shot both of them. Betty died at the scene; Kendall died in hospital on 20 April.
2018-04-11	Kendall Lemoine (50)	Louisiana (Winn Parish)	See entry for Betty Lemoine above.
2018-04-11	Kenneth Ross (25)	California (Gardena)	A shootout was reported in a parking lot; when police arrived, Ross and another suspect ran away in different directions. During a foot chase, Ross drew a gun at police and they shot him.
2018-04-11	Keith Alan Kent (61)	New York (Pembroke)	Police responded to a report of a man in a restaurant, threatening people and firing a gun. They found Kent, armed; he refused several commands to disarm, and they shot him.
2018-04-11	Chad Eric Montgomery (39)	North Carolina (Sparta)	Montgomery entered a sheriff's office and asked to see a particular deputy. When that deputy came to the lobby, Montgomery drew a machete and advanced on the deputy; he ignored commands to drop the knife and the deputy shot him.
2018-04-10	Shawn Michael Hubbard (44)	Montana (Billings)	Hubbard was waving a gun inside a casino and making threats. Police were unable to get him to surrender and shot him. (The weapon turned out to be a pellet gun.)
2018-04-10	Mark Powell (39)	Arizona (Tucson)	Police received a report of a robbery and possible hostage-taking at a check-cashing business. When they arrived, Powell came out of the building armed with a handgun. He did not disarm when ordered, and police shot him.
2018-04-10	Grechario Mack (30)	California (Baldwin Hills)	Mack was reported to be brandishing a knife at people inside a shopping mall. Police arrived, chased him a short way, and shot him.
2018-04-10	Antonino Thomas Gordon (28)	Michigan (Royal Oak)	A police officer attempted to traffic-stop Gordon, who drove off. Later the officer saw Gordon in a fast-food drive-thru; the officer walked toward Gordon, who drove his car into the car behind him and into the patrol car in order to escape. The officer shot Gordon, who drove off wounded and later crashed.
2018-04-09	Robert George Issa (23)	Michigan (Troy)	Issa's family called to report he was violent and they had locked themselves in bedrooms. Police arrived and Issa tried to get into one of their cars and they Tased him; when he charged officers armed with a knife, they shot him.
2018-04-09	Zachary Glen Hoven (29)	Montana (Billings)	Police responded to a report of a man with a knife in an apartment. They talked to Hoven from outside (he threw knives at them and they tried to use a Taser on him), then entered the building. Hoven came out of a room with a knife and police shot him.
2018-04-09	Unknown man	California (Reseda)	Police received a "LoJack" tip that a car had been stolen. They found and pursued the vehicle. When it stopped, the suspect got out and ran, and was shot during the pursuit. (Some databases list this death as Daniel Joseph Carter, age 29), but this entry has no source for the identity.)
2018-04-08	Carlos Roman Urias (24)	California (Cathedral City)	A woman called police to report that her boyfriend, Urias, had assaulted her. When they arrived, she was outside. While they spoke to her, Urias came out of the house armed with a gun; after several commands to disarm, police shot him. The gun turned out to be a replica.
2018-04-08	Juan Markee Jones (25)	Virginia (Danville)	A woman called to report Jones had committed domestic violence against her. Police arrived and tried to arrest Jones, but he fled in a car. When he ran into a tree, he got out of the car; police gave him orders that Jones would not obey, and a Taser did not subdue him; eventually he made a move they found threatening and they shot him.
2018-04-08	Elijah James Smith (20)	Utah (West Valley City)	Officers responding to a reported shoplifting chased Smith on foot. He ran into an unrelated house but was chased out by the residents; he then ran into a second house where three children were home alone. Police came in and found Smith in the garage; they shot him when they believed he was drawing a gun. (He was in possession of a screwdriver.)
2018-04-08	Russell Bowman (45)	Kentucky (Louisville)	Police responded to a report of a man acting erratically, and arrived to find Bowman wielding a screwdriver. He refused their orders to drop it and was unaffected by stun guns; when Bowman charged one of the officers, they shot him.
2018-04-07	John A. Elifritz (48)	Oregon (Portland)	A stolen vehicle was crashed, and the suspect fled before police arrived. They found Elfritz, believed to be the thief, inside a homeless shelter, and shot him during a confrontation. (He is reported to have been slashing and stabbing himself.)
2018-04-07	Larry Siordia (33)	California (Oroville)	Police received a report of shots fired; they arrived and found no evidence of any activity. There was a second call, and a second visit without signs. A woman then called police to report her sister was being held hostage at gunpoint at the same location, and when police came they saw a bullet hole in a window that hadn't been there previously. They surrounded the house; an hour later, Siordia came out with a gun and began firing, so officers shot him.
2018-04-06	Jonathan Erick Alexander (26)	California (Marysville)	Police stopped Alexander for drunk driving, but then he sped off; after a 13-mile chase, they disabled his car. Alexander sat in his car, and police sent a dog to attack him; Alexander shot the dog, then police shot him.
2018-04-06	Antonio Aquino (34)	Nevada (Las Vegas)	Aquino was stopped while driving; he got out of his car with a gun, dropped it, then picked it up again, and officers shot him.
2018-04-06	Daniel Allen Yielding (23)	Arkansas (Searcy County)	Deputies were searching for Yielding on parole violation and found him in some woods. Yielding had a knife and would not give it up; when he started moving toward them, deputies shot him.
2018-04-05	Diante Yarber (26)	California (Barstow)	Police seeking Yarber on a stolen vehicle charge found him in a Walmart parking lot. When they tried to apprehend him, he drove his car into the police cars; police fired into his car killing him.
2018-04-05	Nathaniel Prasad (18)	California (Fremont)	Police seeking Prasad spotted him when he was a passenger in a car. As they tried to stop the car, Prasad got out and ran. After a short foot chase, Prasad fired a gun at the officers, and they returned fire, killing him.
2018-04-05	Raymond Lyle Bell (59)	West Virginia (Reynoldsville)	A sheriff's deputy saw Bell standing in a yard and knew that he was wanted. When the deputy tried to arrest him, Bell first ran into some woods, then turned and drew a gun; the deputy shot him.
2018-04-05	Robert Litolff (81)	New York (Greece)	Police received a call from a man saying he was going to kill his wife. When they arrived, Litolff was in his yard with a rifle; he pointed it at the approaching officer and the officer shot him.
2018-04-05	William Frazier (40)	Pennsylvania (Volant)	Police responded to a report of shots fired, and found by the roadside a utility worker who had been shot. Obtaining a description, they found and chased Frazier, who fired shots out of his car while driving. Once Frazier stopped and got out, he continued to shoot at officers and at passing cars; police shot him.
2018-04-05	Rafael Ramirez (56)	Indiana (South Bend)	Police responded to a report of a man threatening others with a knife. When they arrived, Ramirez confronted them in an apartment stairwell with two knives, and they shot him.
2018-04-04	Grady Parks (70)	Georgia (Molena)	Responding to a call about a man threatening another man with a gun, deputies arrived to find Parks armed with a shotgun and a handgun. He did not obey their orders to disarm, and a Taser was ineffective. When Parks raised the shotgun toward deputies, they shot him.
2018-04-04	Alexis Stinson (44)	Arizona (Phoenix)	Police responded to a call about shots fired. Upon arrival, Stinson approached them with a rifle and fired it, prompting the officers to shoot her.
2018-04-04	Saheed Vassell (34)	New York (Brooklyn)	NYPD officers shot Vassell, a black man armed with a metal pipe, 10 times in Crown Heights. Officers were responding to reports of a man aiming a firearm at people in the street. When the officers arrived, police said, Vassell took a two-handed shooting stance and pointed an object at them. Police released video footage showing Vassell pointing an object at multiple pedestrians and at the arriving officers who shot him as if he were brandishing a gun. Neighbors said that officers should have known him well enough not to shoot him to death. "Every cop in this neighborhood knows him."
2018-04-04	Kelvin Baldwin (30)	Arizona (Mesa)	U.S. marshals were seeking Baldwin; Mesa police officers found and approached him, and Baldwin ran. During the chase, Baldwin pulled out guns, and the officers shot him. He died the next day.
2018-04-04	Unidentified man	Oklahoma (Okmulgee)	A police officer responding to a call about a disturbance at a motel, found a man holding a knife to his own throat. The man would not give up the knife, and when he approached the officer, the officer shot him.
2018-04-04	Adan Rene Marrero (34)	Texas (Corpus Christi)	Responding to a report of a home-invasion robbery, police encountered the three thieves as they were leaving. Police shot Marrero, killing him; arrested a second man; and a third fled.
2018-04-03	Jeffrey Louis Parker (49)	Alabama (Huntsville)	A 911 call reported a suicidal man with a gun. Police arrived to find Parker armed; during an altercation with him, they shot Parker.
2018-04-01	Donald P. McCarter (38)	Missouri (Belton)	Neighbors said that the McCarter had been violent and threatening for some time and had slashed a neighbor's tires. He was reported threatening people with a knife and yelling racial slurs, so police were called. McCarter charged at them with a knife, and they shot him.
2018-04-01	Timothy Wyatt (41)	Florida (Tampa)	Wyatt was wanted for the shooting death of his girlfriend and wounding of two of her sons. Tampa police learned he might be in their area, then found his car. Eventually Wyatt abandoned that car and tried to steal another one from a bystander. Wyatt then shot at officers and they returned fire.
2018-04-01	Luis Yair Alvarez (23)	Texas (Brownsville)	Alvarez's mother called 911 to report that Alvarez was armed and threatening his girlfriend; during the call Alvarez took the phone and made several violent comments, including "it's best for you all to kill me". When police encountered Alvarez, he advanced on them with a knife and they shot him.
2018-04-01	Joseph Walden Johnson (24)	Louisiana (Goodbee)	Deputies believed Johnson to be responsible for vehicle burglaries and tried to pull him over. Johnson led them on a car chase but eventually crashed; when he got out of his car firing a gun (one deputy was injured by his gunfire), deputies shot him.
2018-04-01	Cresencio Rodriguez (33)	Texas (San Antonio)	Deputies responding to a report of a woman who was shot, arrived to find her lying in a yard. While attending to her and searching for her assailant, Rodriguez (who turned out to be her boyfriend) came out of some nearby woods with a gun. He did not obey orders to drop it, and deputies shot him.
2018-04-01	Christopher Hall (34)	Michigan (Jackson)	Police responding to a domestic disturbance found Hall coming out of the house. Hall pulled a gun and started shooting, hitting one officer in the leg; police returned fire, killing Hall.
2018-04-01	Brian Bellamy (41)	North Carolina (Greenville)	A boy called 911 to report that his mom and dad were fighting. Police arrived to find that Bellamy had stabbed his girlfriend. When Bellamy approached the officers with a knife, they shot him.
2018-04-01	Bobby Hinton (60)	Louisiana (New Llano)	Sheriff's deputies responded to a domestic argument call involving Hinton. When they arrived, Hinton shot at them (injuring one deputy), and they returned fire, killing Hinton.
2018-04-01	John Wussler (58)	Arizona (Phoenix)	Police responded to a report that a suspect was in violation of a restraining order. The reporting homeowner identified Wussler, who ran. After a foot chase an officer caught him; they wrestled and the officer drew a Taser. Wussler drew a gun, and the officer drew his gun instead and shot Wussler.

== See also ==
- Death in custody § United States
- Henry A. Wallace Police Crime Public Database
- List of cases of police brutality
- List of countries with annual rates and counts for killings by law enforcement officers
- List of law enforcement officers killed in the line of duty in the United States
- List of law enforcement officers convicted for an on-duty killing in the United States
- List of shootings by US immigration agents
- List of police reforms related to the George Floyd protests
- List of unarmed African Americans killed by law enforcement officers in the United States
- Lists of killings by law enforcement officers
- Police brutality in the United States
- Police misconduct § United States
- Police riot § United States
- Police use of deadly force in the United States
