= Reta Mays =

American serial killer

- Born: Reta Phyllis Mays; June 16, 1975 (age 51); Reynoldsville, West Virginia, U.S.
- Convictions: Second degree murder (7 counts); Assault with intent to commit murder
- Penalty: 7 life terms plus 20 years

Details
- Victims: 8+
- Span of crimes: July 2017 – June 2018
- Country: United States
- State: West Virginia
- Date apprehended: July 14, 2020
- Imprisoned at: FCI Aliceville, Alabama

Reta Phyllis Mays (born June 16, 1975) is an American serial killer who murdered at least seven elderly military veterans over a span of eleven months, between July 2017 and June 2018, by injecting them with lethal doses of insulin while she was employed as a nursing assistant at the Louis A. Johnson Veterans Medical Center, in Clarksburg, West Virginia. On May 11, 2021, Mays was sentenced to seven consecutive life sentences for the murders, plus 20 years for one count of assault with intent to commit murder.

== Background ==
Mays was born in Reynoldsville, West Virginia, in 1975. She was a United States Army West Virginia National Guard veteran who served from November 2000 to April 2001 and again from February 2003 to May 2004, when she deployed to Iraq and Kuwait with the 1092nd Engineer Battalion. Prior to beginning her employment as a nursing assistant at the Louis A. Johnson Veterans Medical Center, Mays had worked as a corrections officer at the West Virginia Department of Corrections at North Central Regional Jail in Greenwood, West Virginia, between 2005 and 2012. In 2013, Mays was one of several defendants in a lawsuit that was brought by an inmate incarcerated at the jail who alleged that he had been repeatedly beaten by Mays and other correction officers. The lawsuit was dismissed on summary judgment.

Mays was a longtime member of Monroe Chapel United Methodist, a small church approximately twenty minutes outside Clarksburg in Lost Creek.

== Murders and investigation ==
In June 2015, Mays began working as a nursing assistant at the Louis A. Johnson Veterans Medical Center in Clarksburg, West Virginia, with no certification or license to care for patients. Nursing assistants at the VAMC are not qualified or authorized to administer any medication to patients, including insulin. Mays was assigned to work overnight shifts on Ward 3A of the hospital's medical surgical unit in July 2017, when elderly patients began suffering mysterious acute drops in their blood sugar level. Over the course of eleven months, hospital staff eventually attributed the deaths of several patients on the ward to hypoglycemia. Many of the deaths were of individuals who were not insulin-dependent. Four of the deaths occurred within sixteen days. One patient, Archie Edgell, an 84-year-old Korean War veteran, initially suffered a drop in his blood sugar to 24 (a reading of less than 70 is low and can be harmful.) He was stabilized by staff, only to die after another plummet of his blood sugar a short time later. An autopsy later found that Edgell had been injected four times. The hospital began an internal investigation of eleven deaths. Mays was fired from the hospital in June 2018, and the investigation was turned over to the Inspector General for the United States Department of Veterans Affairs and the Federal Bureau of Investigation.

A total of 112 patients on Ward 3A died while Mays was employed there as a nursing assistant. Of those deaths, 66 experienced one hypoglycemic event. A total of 21 patients who died triggered an adverse event finding.

The investigation into the deaths of the elderly military veterans began in June 2018 and lasted over two years. Mays remained free; she was questioned three times during the course of the investigation. Each time, she denied any involvement in the deaths. Mays's second interview was conducted by a special agent from the FBI Academy in Quantico, Virginia, and lasted five hours. By then, investigators had built up a strong circumstantial case against Mays, including her internet search history of female serial killers; her Netflix viewing of the series Nurses Who Kill, one episode of which focused on insulin killings; and phone calls made by Mays to her husband, Gordon, who was serving time in jail for child pornography charges in which she bemoaned having to sit with a patient that she wanted to "freaking strangle." Investigators stated that call had been made the morning after one of the blood sugar episodes. During another call to her husband, Mays complained of soreness in her arms from having to do compressions on a patient who, she felt, had "no quality of life", adding that if the staff "would have just said DNR (Do Not Resuscitate), he would have went [sic] to sleep when his sugar dropped down to 30."

The investigation involved more than 300 interviews; the review of phone, social media, and computer records; the review of thousands of pages of medical records and charts; hours of consulting with forensic experts and endocrinologists; the exhumation of some of the bodies of those who were deemed to have died suspiciously; and the review of thousands of hospital staff and visitor records to assess their potential interactions with the deceased. A "person of interest" was officially identified in the autumn of 2019; the person's name was not disclosed, but authorities later stated that Mays had been a person of interest from the beginning.

== Arrest, trial, and conviction ==
In July 2020, Mays was arrested and charged with the murders of eight individuals. The charges were later reduced to seven second-degree murders and one count of intent to commit murder involving the death of the 92-year-old United States Navy veteran Russell R. Posey Sr., who died two weeks after he had been injected with insulin. Prosecutors stated that there were approximately twenty suspicious deaths while Mays worked at the hospital, but charges were brought only for the cases that were believed to have sufficient evidence.

On July 14, 2020, Mays pleaded guilty in the United States District Court for the Northern District of West Virginia in Clarksburg to seven counts of second-degree murder and one count of attempted murder. By pleading guilty to all of the charges, Mays waived the right to have the case presented to a grand jury. Mays wept openly in court and admitted that she had murdered the patients. Mays offered no motive but claimed to be taking medication for post-traumatic stress disorder (PTSD). She was held in custody at the West Virginia Regional Jail and Correctional Facility until her sentencing. An interview with Mays after her guilty plea was included in a report, released after the sentencing by the Department of Veterans Affairs' Office of Inspector General, that detailed deficiencies at the hospital. In it, she stated she administered that insulin to patients that she believed were suffering so that they could pass away "gently." She also stated that she had great stress and chaos in both her personal and professional life and that her actions gave her a sense of control.

On May 11, 2021, Mays was sentenced to seven consecutive life sentences, plus 20 years, during a three-hour-long hearing at the United States District Court for the Northern District of West Virginia in Clarksburg by U.S. District Judge Thomas Kleeh. Mays is ineligible for parole.

During the sentencing, Mays, in tears, gave a brief statement: "There’s no words I can say that can offer the families any comfort. I can only say I’m sorry for the pain I caused them and my family." In addition to her sentence, Mays was ordered to pay $172,624.96 to the victims' families, the VA Hospital, Medicare, and insurance companies. The judge, speaking directly to Mays, stated, "Several times your counsels made the point that you shouldn't be considered a monster. Respectfully, I disagree with that. You are the worst kind. You're the monster that no one sees coming."

In July 2021, Mays was transferred to the low-security Federal Correctional Institution, Aliceville in Alabama. U.S. District Judge Thomas Kleeh had recommended that Mays be placed at Federal Medical Center, Carswell, in Fort Worth, Texas, so that she could receive mental health treatment there; the BOP ultimately assigned her to Aliceville. Since Mays' guilty pleas, the federal government has settled civil lawsuits with the families of 10 victims.

== Victims ==
- March 23/24, 2017: Archie Edgell, 84, a United States Army veteran of the Korean War
- July 19/20, 2017: Robert Edge Sr., 82, a United States Navy veteran of the Korean War
- January 28/29, 2018: Robert Kozul, 89, a United States Army veteran of the Korean War
- March 25/26, 2018: George Shaw Sr., 81, a United States Air Force veteran
- April 3 or 4, 2018: William Holloway, 96, a United States Army veteran of World War II
- April 8 or 9, 2018: Felix McDermott, 82, a United States Army veteran of the Vietnam War
- June 3/4 2018: Raymond Golden, 88, a United States Army and United States Air Force veteran of the Korean War and the Vietnam War
- June 17 or 18, 2018: Russell R. Posey Sr., 92, a United States Navy veteran of World War II. Posey later died at a nursing home on July 3, 2018. The medical examiner could not conclusively confirm that the insulin with which Mays injected him had been the direct cause of death. Mays was convicted on one count of assault with intent to commit murder in connection with the assault on Posey.

== See also ==
- List of serial killers in the United States
