= List of Reno 911! characters =

TV show

This is a list of characters appearing on the television program Reno 911!.

== Main characters ==
=== Lieutenant Dangle ===
Lieutenant James "Jim" Ronald Dangle (played by Thomas Lennon) is the flamboyant highest-ranking deputy in the department and is usually seen wearing his trademark short-shorts, which he claims that he wears for "mobility." In a season 6 episode where the officers watch a video of themselves in the late 1980s, Dangle is seen wearing full-length jeans. Unfortunately, his jeans caught fire, forcing Dangle to cut the bottom parts of his pants off, resulting in the hot-pants he currently wears.

Dangle is gay. In an interview, Lennon says, "There's always this question, 'When's Dangle coming out?' and I'm like, 'Have you seen the show?' On the first episode, he makes out with another man for about two minutes... I guess people think he's closeted because Trudy is in love with him, but that has more to do with the fact that she's severely brain-damaged."

Dangle openly harbors an attraction to Jones and occasionally flirts with suspects. In one episode, Jones apparently had sex with him out of sympathy ("I'll try anything once"), after which Dangle was hospitalized because, as Jones said it, "he can't fucking walk" (the incident occurs off-camera, with the actual events undisclosed). Dangle was briefly married to a woman named Debbie (see below) and he briefly believed that he fathered a son (a result of sex with what he thought was a drag queen), but DNA results proved otherwise. Dangle also felt attraction to a female Homeland Security officer in town to conduct counter-terrorism training, but the experience left him uncomfortable and confused. It was revealed later that the female officer was actually a very well-disguised man (and was part of a team of con artists, along with the other Homeland Security "trainer"), which caused sexual confusion among the heterosexual deputies who had also felt attracted to "her".

Prior to Trudy's brain damage, Dangle apparently had an affair with her while married to Deb in 1988. Despite her brain damage, he still engages Trudy romantically on occasion, most notably in Miami, where Trudy asks Dangle to have sex with her out of pity, which he tries but fails to do.

Dangle leads the briefings in the mornings, but often ditches work along with other officers, as one time Dangle spent an afternoon trying to destroy an old microwave instead of investigating a murder. He apparently keeps tabs on officers after or during work, as he is found by Johnson in her favorite salon, using her name for an appointment.

Dangle is favorable to Jones, and compares Jones to glue, saying he and the department are "A little birdhouse that Jones is keeping together." Dangle, along with the entire department, is extremely unqualified for his job, even to the point of sheer incompetence, as he is sometimes either seduced or misled by suspects to let them go. Dangle, alongside his fellow officers, engages in police brutality, as he once beat a suspect to tears after the suspect had insulted him. Dangle idolizes the FBI, as in an episode where a group of FBI agents come to investigate a murder, he makes his officers line up in perfect order to greet them, and takes on an "important" mission to get coffee for the agents happily, but resents them for taking charge of his case.

Dangle once worked as a maitre d' and served in the United States Coast Guard Reserve (stationed in Hawaii) but was discharged for undisclosed reasons (perhaps pertaining to his homosexuality). In Episode 102, his age is noted as 41.

Born and raised in Arkansas, Dangle and his mother were abandoned by his father when he was a child. After his mother committed suicide, Dangle was raised by his uncle Frederick, who was kicked out of the Jesuits. Meanwhile, Dangle's father moved to Chicago and started a new family.

Dangle's father had two more biracial children who appear in season 5 to visit Dangle after the death of their father to settle the will. The inheritance turns out to be a bill of more than $5,000 for the funeral and a Banana Splits keychain Jim's half-sister gives him.

Dangle is also the subject of a number of running gags. As the primary running gag, his police bicycle is repeatedly stolen or vandalized. Junior is suggested as being responsible for these incidents. Dangle carries a Desert Eagle handgun while searching for his bicycle. Another running gag depicts repeated appearances in flamboyantly homosexual civilian clothing at scenes wherein other deputies respond and identify him, for example, as a male prostitute in a group of prostitutes walking the street.

=== Deputy Wiegel ===
Deputy Trudy Wiegel (played by Kerri Kenney-Silver) is a brain-damaged, emotionally unstable, heavily-medicated woman. She is a hypochondriac with multiple psychological disorders, occasional night terrors, and suicidal ideations. She is generally neurotic with low self-esteem and an intense love for cats, for which she wears a lapel pin of a cat on her uniform. She claims to be of German and Native American descent.

Wiegel enjoys crafts and collecting baby clothes, and is infatuated with Dangle. Her favorite picnic location is her mother's grave. In season 2, she begins dating a man named Craig Pullin (Kyle Dunnigan), who is revealed to be the "Truckee River Killer". After his arrest and conviction, she continues their relationship via prison visits, both through a glass partition and conjugal visits; they marry on the day of his execution. Wiegel's father, mentioned in season 1 and appearing in season 5, is a Native American (The network censored a 30-second story about her father being lynched by a white mob reacting to news that a non-white man "raped" her mother).

The fourth season opens with Wiegel returning after six months of maternity leave; Kenney-Silver's pregnancy was written into the show.

In the sixth season episode "VHS Transfer Memory Lane", it is revealed that Wiegel's behavior and mental defects are the result of brain damage that occurred after an explosion at a drug raid in 1988. Wiegel was rendered unconscious by an explosion and was clinically dead for 14 minutes, causing severe damage. She was resuscitated by Dangle, who regrets saving her life. The doctor who treated her thereafter said he "should have let her go." Prior to the drug raid, she was a flirtatious sexpot.

There is some information that contradicts the timeline. In "Stoner Jesus", Jones mentions that he has worked with Wiegel for 15 years, yet in "VHS Transfer Memory Lane" earlier that season, he is shown in the police video tape from 1988 working alongside Wiegel, which would have been 21 years prior to that episode.

Wiegel usually adheres to the department's uniform code, except for when she requests and is granted a new Kevlar vest for women (soon revealed to be ineffective). She wears a looser maternity version of the uniform when pregnant, and makes reference to having worn maternity pants to work. A running gag indicates that Wiegel is ill-equipped to dress properly when performing undercover work that requires seductive clothing, such as an undercover prostitution sting. In such cases, Wiegel wears old-fashioned and over-sized underclothing which fits poorly with her skimpy undercover outfit. She can be spotted wearing a name tag on her uniform with her name misspelled as "Wiegle" (seen in Season 6, Episode 1: Training Day).

=== Deputy Jones ===
Deputy Sergeant Class II Sisyphus Cosman Jones (played by Cedric Yarbrough) is an emotionally detached African-American "smooth-talker" who frequently channels his need for attention into sexually promiscuous behavior. He is often called "Jonesy" by his co-workers.

Jones was raised in Mound, Minnesota (a suburb of the "Twin Cities" area of Minneapolis-St. Paul). He has been described by Dangle as "a big, hardworking, robust, sort of mocha-ish person." He is a horrible dancer, but a talented singer with a wide vocal range, singing in either a deep baritone or a high-pitched, R&B-style falsetto.

Jones is often partnered with Garcia and the two are close friends (until Garcia's death at the end of season 5), even getting jobs together as shopping mall security guards when they lose their jobs as deputies and both getting promoted to mounted patrol, where they are also assigned as partners. Their relationship is not without conflict, with Jones on one occasion punching Garcia for making a racist joke, causing him to be suspended. In season seven, after it is discovered that Garcia was born in Mexico and has been living as an illegal alien, he and Jones marry to keep him from being deported, after everyone else in the station refused to do so.

Despite Garcia's racism, he and Jones have an awkwardly healthy working relationship. As close as they are, however, they occasionally engage in childish physical altercations with each other. It is implied – typically, by Deputy Williams herself – that he is Raineesha's ex-boyfriend, although he seems to pursue every woman other than her.

Despite Williams' jealous attraction to him, he has an on-again/off-again, "booty call"-type relationship with Johnson. Jones is the only male deputy without a mustache. Jones' first name is left unknown for most of the series, only revealed as starting with "S". In Miami: The Lost Version, it is revealed that Jones' first name is Sven. However, in the season seven episode "Garcia Self Deports", Garcia refers to him as "Sisyphus Cosman Jones" during the vow exchange of their wedding ceremony.

In season 6, the department watch a tape from 1988. In this time, Jones is revealed to be more confident than his current self, and has a sexual attraction to Williams. Dangle then forwards the tape to November 10, 1988, involving a meth lab with armed dealers guarding it. After assorted mishaps, Jones starts to scream in an extremely high-pitched voice and flees. Afterwards, he loses all sexual attraction to Williams, and gains an attraction to Johnson.

Jones is third in command below Dangle and Garcia, who holds the rank of Deputy Sergeant Class III, and is followed by Deputy Sergeant Class I Johnson.

=== Deputy Garcia ===
Deputy Sergeant Class III James Oswaldo Garcia (seasons 1–5, 7–8; played by Carlos Alazraqui) is an arrogant, racist, sexist, angry and depressed former Marine helicopter pilot. A running gag involves Garcia firing shots at people or objects without hitting them due to his comically terrible marksmanship, and giving suspects "a little of the old stick time", in which he beats them with his billy club. Garcia is the first character shown in the series, responding to a police call at a house. It is revealed that it is a surprise party, but Garcia, startled, shoots a fellow officer.

Garcia is known to be very rough when arresting suspects, perhaps as a result of his inferiority complex. Despite poor marksmanship, Garcia has shot multiple people. His personal life is often the subject of ridicule by his contemporaries, who mock his frequent bowel movements (Dangle once said that in the men's room, Garcia sounded like the Battle of Normandy), his excessive masturbation and his habit of drinking alone while watching Hill Street Blues reruns. He has a daughter whom he has not seen for several years, prompting Dangle to hire a stripper to pretend to be his daughter in order to elate him. He also has a younger sister, whose life the other deputies manage to wreck, because of their mistaken belief that she is his girlfriend and is cheating on Garcia with another man (who turns out to be her actual fiancé). Miami revealed that he had flown an AH-1 HueyCobra for the U.S. Marine Corps.

Garcia is usually partnered with Jones, leading to situational humor involving Garcia's racism and general ignorance of African American culture; despite this, the two are friends. He has had brief relationships with Johnson and Williams, and on more than one occasion, it is implied that he harbored a homoerotic attraction to Kenny Rogers. At the end of season 4, he elopes with Dangle's husband-to-be Leslie during their civil commitment ceremony, revealed in the season 5 premiere to be a bizarre practical joke, as Garcia arrests Dangle and his boyfriend on the grounds that same-sex marriage is illegal in Nevada.

Garcia is killed in an explosion at the end of season 5. In the season 6 episode "The Midnight Swingers", his ashes are fired from a cannon, as per his will; however, the deputies' attempt misfires and a squad car is destroyed in the process, for which Garcia is subsequently and posthumously blamed.

Garcia is second in command below Dangle, and is followed by Jones, who holds the rank of Deputy Sergeant Class II, and Johnson, who holds the rank of Deputy Sergeant Class I.

Alazraqui returned as Garcia on the November 13, 2014 episode of @midnight, where it is revealed he transferred to Carson City, and his death was a prank to mess with Wiegel.

=== Deputy Johnson ===
Deputy Sergeant Class I Clementine "Clemmy" Johnson (seasons 1–5, 7–8; played by Wendi McLendon-Covey) is a promiscuous, trashy, drug-friendly woman who always wears her uniform partially unbuttoned, exposing her ample cleavage. Johnson is absent in season 6 as she was seemingly killed in the explosion at the end of the fifth season; this was later revealed to be a prank and she is alive and well in season 7.

Before joining the Reno Sheriff's Department, Johnson was a magician's assistant in Branson, Missouri, an exotic dancer, a Wiccan and a Steely Dan groupie. Her comment at a wedding about performing the night before for the bachelor party clarified that she had an off-duty job. She has a tattoo on her back which once said "Steed" (a one-time boyfriend), later changed to "Steely Dan" after the relationship ended. Early in the first season, she had a relationship with Jones, but she also enjoyed a brief relationship with Garcia in season 2, a relationship she compared to "getting a flu shot" ("You do it once, and you never have to do it again!"). Despite this claim, she was shown silently mourning the end of that relationship. She had Garcia's face tattooed on her breast after a drunken incident when the sheriffs went to Miami, Florida. On one occasion, she married Steed and later discovered the marriage was unofficial because the couple had forgotten to obtain a marriage license. When she mistakenly believed herself to be pregnant, she approached first Jones and then Dangle about marrying her and acting as a father to her unborn child. She had a troubled relationship with her mother because they sometimes argued over men. In one episode, her mother was shown to be working as a prostitute.

When the officers were fired following an investigation by District Attorney Mike Powers (Mather Zickel), Johnson returned to touring with Steely Dan (whom she called "The Dan") for a short time before returning to the Reno Sheriff's Department with the others. Johnson was later promoted in Episode 506 when she confronted the Captain of the sheriff's department regarding objectification through the use of the new "Kevlar for Her" vests. She returned claiming she had been promoted, in which case she would be classified as a Sergeant Class I if everyone else (except Dangle and his second-in-command, Garcia, and third-in-command, Jones) is a Deputy.

Johnson is an admitted drunk driver and a user of marijuana, and is usually lenient toward fellow users.

Johnson is fourth in command below Dangle, and Garcia, who holds the rank of Deputy Sergeant Class III, and Jones, who holds the rank of Deputy Sergeant Class II.

=== Deputy Williams ===
Deputy Raineesha Williams (born Megan Linderman; played by Niecy Nash) is a boisterous woman who enjoys abusing the power over men that her police authority affords her.

Williams' proudest possession is her enormous posterior (a prosthetic that Nash wears under the uniform), which was featured in a pornographic magazine called "Strong Sistas". She often exclaims "...Haahhh?!?" for effect, after making a blunt statement. She is a single mother, and in one episode claimed she couldn't name the fathers of any of her three children, although in another episode, she says that "one of my babies' daddies, he can "read real good." In the pilot, she claims to have recently split up with Jones, but she is still willing to answer his booty calls. In season 5, Jones tells a reporter that Williams' real name is Megan Linderman.

Jones has described Williams as a terrible police officer ("they don't even put bullets in her gun") and that she is illiterate. She often looks for ways to abuse her authority for her personal benefit; she once converted to the Nation of Islam in an attempt to take the month of September (Ramadan on the Islamic calendar) off from work, so she could vacation at the Atlantis resort. She frequently uses Mace merely out of anger. As other deputies have their trademark personalizations on their uniforms, Raineesha always wears a patrol hat.

At the beginning of season 3, she worked as a real estate agent before returning to the Sheriff's Department.

=== Deputy Junior ===
Deputy Travis Junior (played by Robert Ben Garant) is a stereotypical redneck cop who loves beer, buffalo wings, NASCAR, guns, Ernest movies and—perhaps most of all—his moustache, which he confesses he feels makes him look gay when standing next to Dangle. His character provides much of the physical comedy, performing most of the major stunts.

Junior trains the police dogs for the department and is rarely seen without his trademark aviator sunglasses. He started wearing his Kevlar vest after he was shot and nearly blinded in a 1988 drug sting. Junior always wears his vest over his uniform shirt; he claimed that he forgets to put the vest under his shirt because he is always a little hung over in the morning. He wears his hair in a military "high and tight" haircut and is cross-eyed, which is why he usually wears sunglasses. Despite this, he claims to be the best shot in the department. Perhaps unsurprisingly, he is the only heterosexual male deputy in the Reno Sheriff's Department that Johnson hasn't slept with.

Junior spends his time stealing Dangle's bicycle, and likes utilizing police brutality. Junior is considered to be an idiot by most of his fellow officers, as one time, he ran after an invisible suspect in a robbery upon directions by a bystander who happened to have a gun and several bundles of cash from the store, even after the bystander said he had robbed the store after being "forced".

Junior has three brothers, who also wear sunglasses and have the same traits: Henry "Hank" Junior, Jr., from Panama City, Florida; Lance Corporal "Rooster" Junior, who serves in the U.S. Marine Corps, currently stationed in Tikrit, Iraq; and "Tater" Junior, from Sparks, Nevada. By season 7, he is married to a Korean woman, has a daughter, and his mother-in-law has moved into their house.

Junior has been reprimanded at least twice for his pornography addiction, and is somewhat in denial about his problem. He is revealed to be Kimball's cousin. At the beginning of season 3 (in which the characters are shown in jail) a swastika tattoo is seen on his chest (similar to the that worn by Edward Norton's character in American History X), but in the 2007 film, he is seen shirtless and the tattoo is absent. Before returning to the Reno Sheriff's Department, Junior worked at a carnival, something he claims is his "dream job".

There are several running gags concerning Junior. The first is the "traffic stop": Junior pulls over a driver and is rendered unconscious or otherwise by an opening door or something falling off from the vehicle. Another involves him stealing or tampering with Dangle's unattended bicycle, much to Dangle's annoyance. The other gags usually involve him being mauled by dogs, being electrocuted, catching on fire or falling, jumping or being thrown through or off of something, or otherwise incapacitated.

=== Deputy Kimball ===
Deputy Cherisha Kimball (seasons 3–5, 7–8; played by Mary Birdsong) is a pious, tough, no-nonsense police officer, the polar opposite of Johnson. Kimball is absent in season 6, as she was seemingly killed in the explosion at the end of the season 5; this was later revealed to be a prank and she is alive and well in season 7.

Hailing from Shreveport, Louisiana, Kimball joins Reno Sheriff's Department early in season 3, winning a competition among top police academy graduates; however, she was only chosen after the two frontrunners withdrew for various reasons. She is perpetually accused of being a lesbian, despite her denials when asked, and when asked for dates by lesbians. She spends her off-duty time with her church group (composed of male, Christian virgins), singing karaoke of old gospel songs. In one instance, after Kimball states she would be making some major changes in her life after receiving a jet ski, Dangle asked, "You're finally coming out as a lesbian?" He was convinced even after she rejected the statement.

Kimball said that she joined law enforcement because her "past is filled with sin and small time crimes and misdemeanors. Enforcing the law is my way of righting all my wrongs, cleaning up my karma. Also, they give good benefits." When she is the first to arrive at the scene of Junior's "officer down" radio call, and thinking that his gunshot wound is near-fatal, she eventually admits to having had erotic fantasies of women. Junior then reveals he is not mortally wounded, and had organized the scenario in an attempt to deceive her into having sex with him. In the course of what she thinks is a conversation with someone about to die, the two exchange information on their family backgrounds; Kimball and Junior gradually realize that they share a common uncle in Louisiana. Despite realizing they share a family member, Kimball and Junior are seen being romantically involved. In "Kevlar for Her", Kimball and Junior are seen at a bar together seemingly on a date. At the end of that episode, Junior is seen secretly admiring a wedding ring, seemingly about to propose to Kimball before shooting her ineffective Kevlar vest.

=== Sergeant Declan ===
Sergeant Jack Declan (seasons 6–8; played by Ian Roberts) joined the show in season 6. He is the new second in command after Dangle, to whom Declan is often seen sucking up; with the exception when the barely fluent office assistant Cindy mistakenly promotes everyone to Captain, and Declan tells Dangle to "suck my dick." He is sometimes called "Cap'n Jack" by Dangle and other deputies.

He appears confident of himself, when compared to most of the other deputies, but exhibits massive insecurities at other times, such as sobbing uncontrollably and talking to himself through a bathroom stall door, or exhibiting problems with anger management. On one occasion when confronting Cindy about some misplaced clothing he asked her to wash for him, it is alluded to that he may in fact cross-dress, as Junior received the clothing by accident and found extra extra large female undergarments with Jack's initials on them, mixed in with the other clothing. Despite his rage issues, he is still shown to be a very good cop. Declan also carries a bigger and more powerful weapon than the rest of his colleagues. While the other officers carry Beretta 92s, he carries a .44 Magnum revolver.

=== Deputy Rizzo ===
Deputy Frank Salvatore Rizzo (seasons 6–8; played by Joe Lo Truglio) joined the show in season 6. He is from Ozone Park, Queens (where Lo Truglio himself was born), where he has been banned from for undisclosed "reasons that [he takes] full responsibility for". He has a long history in law enforcement, working in many cities across the country and is infatuated with Wiegel (on one occasion, they engaged in sexual activities in a trailer being pulled by an unsuspecting perpetrator and were left across the Mexican border). Junior has said that despite his history in law enforcement, Rizzo did not have a single recommendation, which Dangle considers "breaks even". Rizzo is also fluent in Japanese. Rizzo has two children: Frank "Frankie" Salvatore Rizzo, Jr. and Isabella "Izzy" Salvatore Rizzo, and it is implied that he and his wife have divorced.

Like the other deputies, Rizzo behaves unprofessionally on numerous occasions, also insinuating he has a cocaine habit. On one occasion, he solicited prostitutes to perform oral sex on him and Jones during a narcotics sting, half-jokingly suggesting the two split the drug money impounded in the bust.

== Guest characters ==
Reno 911! features many other notable comedians, some of whom appear on the show multiple times in different roles. In addition, the principal cast members frequently play recurring roles of criminals or otherwise dysfunctional characters (with pixelated or blurred faces).

- Agent Steve Hardcastle (Ian Roberts): An FBI profiler who arrives in Reno to help the department locate the Lieutenant Governor's brother, Ray Mendoza. However, his incompetence makes him even more ineffectual than the deputies, and they eventually locate the man without his help. Roberts, who played Hardcastle, arrived several seasons later as Sgt. Jack Declan: heavier, with a mustache.
- Andrew (Jim Rash): An eccentric homeowner, habitual brothel patron, and purveyor of pleasure, his activities draw regular police intervention. The unemployed Andrew claims that his job is to "mix things up", and offenses of his include flamboyant Christmas yard displays in early summer, impromptu parades, and even calling 911 himself to report that a brothel did not display signs requiring employees to wash hands before starting work.
- Bachelorette Party Women: A group of raucous young women who conduct wild bachelorette parties and attempt to lure in male cops to strip for them. On one occasion, Garcia responds to a call and berates them, then discovers Junior and Dangle in the room clad in underwear, boots, and holsters.
- Big Mike (Toby Huss): The resident Reno meth-head and "Captain of Suspicious Behavior". The deputies frequently visit Big Mike's house to investigate complaints of domestic violence and disturbing the peace. It's revealed in season 6 that Mike was the no-nonsense lieutenant in the Sheriff's Department in 1988 (Junior remarked that he thought Mike was on his way to being Governor of Nevada), until his accidental introduction to meth at a crime scene began his downward spiral to his current state.
- Boozehammer of Galen (Patton Oswalt): A fantasy role-playing game geek who often badly hurts his opponents while playing fantasy games. He also frequents the "Reno Renaissance Fair". In a season 2 deleted scene, he is revealed to be Dangle's cousin. Oswalt would go on to appear in Reno 911!: Miami as Jeff Spooder.
- Brad the Friendly Homeowner (Andrew Daly): A genial householder who is always excited to visit with the deputies. When CSI comes to town and his neighbor shoots at the deputies, he thinks filming has commenced. In season 5, he tries to purchase Coconut Nut Clusters from the department but forgets to sign the check before committing suicide in the next room.
- Bunny Hernandez (Natasha Leggero): Mayor Hernandez's wife, a former porn actress and exotic dancer. The deputies pull her over for drunk driving thinking she's someone else. When they see that they have the mayor's wife, they drive her home after she drunkenly falls to the ground, defecates on someone's lawn, and masturbates in the squad car's backseat.
- Calvin Robin Tomlinson (Rainn Wilson): A convicted serial killer given a deal to avoid the death penalty if he leads the deputies to the burial site of one of his victims. He makes various demands (a milkshake, watching Cold Mountain on VHS, using a public bathroom for an hour), then leads them to where he hid a gun and a motor scooter, on which he escapes.
- Carmen (Sarah Tiana): A young woman with a speech impediment who calls the department "a few times a week". She has attempted to build stone walls in her front yard to keep terrorists out, and called Jones (who had previously hooked up with her) to her house to help "bust up a chifforobe" (referencing the novel To Kill a Mockingbird). On one occasion, Wiegel and Dangle visit to question her about a missing vacuum-cleaner salesman; it's soon revealed that she murdered and decapitated him in her house ("They come apart real easy", she says).
- Carrot Top: A comedian who trashes his hotel room, throwing the furniture out the window and into the pool several stories below. He pretends to write a check to the hotel manager, then steals Deputy Jones' gun and escapes in an idling squad car.
- Chief Carl (Carlos Alazraqui): A homeless Native American man caught selling illegal fireworks, and summons the police when he is caught at a carnival illegally selling popcorn on a stick. Apparently mentally ill, he bathes in "goat water" and makes outrageous claims, such as that he attended the "1920 World's Fair".
- Cindy the Sex Slave (Wanru Tseng): Speaking only broken English and freed from human trafficking by the department, the department is unable to pay for her return shipping, so she is given a job as a secretary in the department. She is frequently corrected by the deputies for clerical errors and occasionally devolving back to her sex worker habits.
- Citizens' Patrolman Rick (Paul Reubens): First seen in Season 4, he is a member of the "Citizens' Patrol" (which seems to be inspired by the Guardian Angels) and shows up at crime scenes and notices critical things that the deputies have missed. He always seems to be one step ahead of the deputies—because he's the one who committed the crimes. Reubens would later appear in Miami as Terry's father.
- Inspector Martin Smiley (Tom Bolster): A British police constable who visits Reno as part of the "Badges Across the Water" foreign exchange program. Initially he seems to be a very proper, upright, old-fashioned Englishman and the Reno deputies adore him. Deputy Garcia sees a very different side when Smiley rides along with him. He savagely beats a motorist with a torch (flashlight) after a routine traffic-stop, then later is revealed to be receiving oral sex from a woman in the back seat of the patrol-car. Eventually he is shot and killed after attempting to rob a drug den in Reno, and his body is shipped back to the United Kingdom.
- Craig Pullin (Kyle Dunnigan): Wiegel's boyfriend, then husband, in seasons 1-3. While both he and Wiegel appear to be shy, socially awkward people, their sex life includes sexual role-playing and fetishism. Pullin turned out to be the "Truckee River Killer" and was executed by lethal injection at the end of season 3, immediately after marrying Trudy. In season 7, he returns as what Trudy believes is a ghost but is actually the result of a gas-leak hallucination.
- Debbie (Rachael Harris): Dangle's ex-wife, who seems to be attracted solely to gay men. She is the heiress to a vacuum cleaner fortune; Jim married her because she was morbidly obese and he believed she would die soon. After they separated, she underwent gastric bypass surgery which turned her into "something the old Deb would have eaten", as he put it. She finally requested a divorce because she had fallen in love with Leslie Frost (see below), who was also clearly gay. Debbie appeared in season 6 with her new husband, Gary Werner (played by Scott Thompson), who was very effeminate but straight. Debbie died of complications from overeating at Dangle's murder-mystery dinner.
- "Delicious Milkshake Man" (real name: Andrew Freeman) (Nat Faxon): A young man who wears a large milkshake costume to promote a local restaurant. He is harassed, pursued, and beaten by Jones and Garcia in several early episodes. Finally, a chase ends with him being hit by a tractor-trailer; his death leads to the investigation, termination, and incarceration of all the deputies.
- "Dominatrix" (Debra Wilson): She appeared during season 5, including a visit responding to complaints from "the kettle-corn people" about explicitly-worded ad flyers she had distributed at the Farmer's Market. According to Dangle, she is actually a transsexual named Jeff, and was Dangle's swim teammate in high school.
- The Drunk-Driving Pilot (Ron White): A drunken airline pilot whom Deputy Johnson lets off with a warning after he flatters her.
- Eddie "Fast Eddie" McLintock (unseen, voiced by Jeff Foxworthy): A famed drug runner and recidivist speeder who has been involved in multiple high-speed car chases with the Reno Sheriff's Department. He mocks and later commends the Deputies via CB radio. His muscle car and personality are modeled after Burt Reynolds' character from Smokey and the Bandit.
- Firefighters of the Reno Fire Department (Mitch Rouse, Guy Stevenson): Unlike the Sheriff's Department, the members of the fire department are competent, popular, and well-respected, inspiring tremendous envy, bitterness, inadequacy—and secret admiration—from the cops.
- French mime (Robert Ben Garant): A man in mime costume and makeup who is reported for harassing customers outside a strip mall. To Jones' delight, he performs a silent parody of Garcia—who becomes enraged and assaults, then arrests him.
- The Fraudulent Manager of Burger Cousin (Seth Green): A petty, browbeating robber who poses as the manager of a fast-food restaurant at which Jones and Garcia have gone undercover as employees to catch a robber whom they do not realize is already there.
- Frisbee McDaniels (Zach Galifianakis): A "white trash" resident of Reno who squats with his sizable family in an abandoned school bus. He owns a .30 cal machine gun which he claims he bought at a yard sale. He uses it to shoot at empty cans, oranges, and UFOs. He casually revealed that his wife is his second cousin. His children's names include Chandler, Ross, Joey, Dharma, and Greg after characters from popular television sitcoms Friends and Dharma & Greg.
- Glen the Ranger (Matt Walsh): A park ranger at a fictional (though often referenced to be near the Donner Party cabin) National Park. Glen is very lonely and routinely places false 911 calls in order to get some human contact from the sheriff's deputies.
- Gigg LeCarp (Los Angeles radio DJ Brian Phelps): A petty-criminal-turned-televangelist who, 10 years ago, was arrested by then-partners Dangle and Garcia. LeCarp was causing trouble while high on PCP, so Garcia used his nightstick to "give him a message from my Lord". He later pretends to "save" Garcia and locks all of the deputies in the holding cell as revenge.
- The Great Jeff (Jeremy Rowley): A magician in the park without a permit that Kimball tries to arrest. Jeff escapes her handcuffs and riot cuffs and then locks her in her squad car.
- Guy Gerricault (Paul Rudd): Wiegel's disturbingly enthusiastic, inappropriately hands-on Lamaze teacher. Rudd would appear in Reno 911!: Miami as Ethan the Drug Lord.
- Handicapped cop (David Wain): A supposedly handicapped cop with whom Wiegel spends a day with as part of a public-assistance program.
- Ian Meltzer (Matt Walsh): Subject to a subpoena being served by Dangle and Junior. Despite initially confirming his identity, his name being on a name tag, and being overheard greeting a caller with his name, he denies being Ian Meltzer and leads the officers on a short chase.
- Jackie DeMartino (Kerri Kenney-Silver): A susbtance-addicted and erratically-behaving prostitute with herpes, AIDS, Lupus, and lung cancer, her face is always blurred and she wears heavy cosmetics with an obvious wig. Jackie states she is from Fort Wayne, Indiana. In her most prominent scene in Season 1, Garcia, as part of the "Fallen Angels" program, is tasked with correcting her behavior and getting her off the streets. By the end of Garcia's encounter with Jackie, Garcia is so frustrated by her behavior, he drives her to a random house. Garcia states the house is a halfway house, despite knowing the house is halfway between the restaurant they patronized and his home. It has been suggested that Trudy and Jackie are similar-looking distant cousins. Jackie died of Lupus in Season 5; it is unknown who plays her in a scene in which Deputy Wiegel arrives to comfort her as she dies.
- Jerry Salerno (Dan Castellaneta): The violent, possibly mobbed-up "Washoe County Animal Carcass Removal Commissioner." In season 5, when he is up for re-election, Junior runs against him, but Salerno maintains his office by paying off Junior after beating him severely with a dead cat.
- Joe the Cameraman (Joe Kessler): The usually-unseen cameraman who documents the Reno Sheriff's Department's activities. He is shown on-camera playing the drums when the deputies respond to a noise complaint about a bad garage band in season 2, and is also shown in the episode which includes the "second take" of Junior being thrown through a glass door.
- John (Brian Finney): A crazed man seen at a brothel disturbing the peace on multiple occasions. In one instance, he claims to be an agent of the department of weights and measurements, but after trying to make up a story for Johnson and Kimball, he tries to run but ends up caught.
- Junior the Third (DeRay Davis): A delusional homeless man, who was once seen sitting on a couch on the sidewalk pretending to interview Morgan Freeman as on a talk show.
- Kenny Rogers: A famous American country music singer and actor with whom Garcia is obsessed to the point of having recurring dreams about him, one of which featured Rogers waking up in bed next to Dangle. Rogers was shot by a nameless character (played by Patton Oswalt) in season 2 after a poorly-attended book signing (in that same episode, Rogers' real-life son Christopher Cody Rogers played a frat boy trying to get into the locked frat house the morning after a wild night)
- Kevin (Michael Ian Black). A convicted sex offender who moves to Reno and attempts to ask Johnson out while he and she informs his neighbors of his crimes.
- Ku Klux Klan (Reno Chapter of): A group of presumed bigots who ostensibly are trying to end bigotry and racism in Reno. Their tactics include burning crosses and operating lemonade stands for presumably prosocial reasons. Their stated intentions are that, because crosses resemble the lowercase letter "T" (for "truth", as they proclaim) and their lemonade stands provide free lemonade for black people, they are promoting racial integration. One of the KKK members, Gary (Chris Tallman), proposes to his African American girlfriend and, in another episode, sheds his Klan robes to join Junior and Garcia on a trip to the US/Mexico border to build a wall.
- Trailer-Park Lady (Cheryl Hines): A trailer-park resident who tries to get her neighbor arrested for crossing over the property line, which consists of two cigarette butts and a green rock. She is later arrested for taking Officer Garcia's nightstick and attempting to hit the neighbor.
- Leslie Frost (Dave Holmes): Dangle's ex-wife Debbie's second husband, owner of "Buy-Curios", a knickknack/antique store frequented by Dangle and Garcia.
- Maria Storm (Lisa LoCicero): A local TV reporter who has extensively covered the Reno Sheriff's Department. She is frequently hit upon by her male interviewees. Actress Lisa LoCicero is married to show director Michael Patrick Jann.
- Mayor Hernandez (George Lopez): Reno's thoroughly-corrupt, philandering mayor. He is perpetually under investigation, but counts on the Reno Sheriff's Department to clean up his messes. Williams says that the Mayor has a "Clintonesque quality" about him, while Dangle describes him as a nice guy who "loves to put his dick in things." In season 6, Hernandez was caught on film cheating on his wife with his girlfriend. It has also been revealed that he was responsible for the deaths of several hookers, with the Reno Sheriff's department disposing of the corpses. Despite his corrupt and erratic nature, Dangle and Junior describe him as the "best Mayor we've ever had, by a long shot", noting that all the other mayors were far worse. Even after being arrested and convicted of several felonies, he wins re-election by a landslide.
- Mike Powers (Mather Zickel): The former Washoe County district attorney, responsible for firing and later jailing the entire Reno Sheriff's Department at the end of season 2. He is later revealed to be a murderer who decapitates prostitutes. While in prison, the deputies visit him to ask his advice (similar to Hannibal Lecter) on office procedures and other trivial matters.
- Mrs. Leonard (Mindy Sterling): An apartment resident who calls 911 five to six times a week. One time, she reports that children, particularly an obese child named Joey, are disturbing her afternoon nap by bouncing balls, playing marbles, and talking about homework, loudly in the hallway. Ironically, her three dogs are barking the whole time Dangle and Junior are trying to assist her. Junior proceeds to "find Joey" and shoot him five times, and Mrs. Leonard, horrified, sobs in her apartment doorway as Junior and Dangle depart, with Junior revealing that he in fact shot a radiator.
- Naked Armenian (J. P. Manoux): A partially-clothed Armenian man who causes various public disturbances while under the influence of Ecstasy. He is usually unable to engage in meaningful conversation or appreciate the reality of his circumstances due to his substance use.
- The "New" Deputies: At the end of season 2, all seven main characters are fired and imprisoned, to be replaced by other deputies who bear a passing resemblance to them. They are: Jim Kringle "New Dangle" (Martin Mull), Cletus Senior "New Junior" (Lou Ferrigno), Wendy Kelton "New Wiegel" (Sean Young), Officer Garcia "New Garcia" (Lorenzo Lamas), Verlot "New Williams" (Traci Bingham), Barbara Cooper "New Johnson" (Donna D'Errico) and C. Garwood "New Jones" (Wayne Brady). "New Jones", whose name is given in a subtitle as "Deputy C. Garwood", immediately discloses what the "C" stands for, while Jones' "S" initial has remained a secret throughout the entire run.
- Pageant Mom and Dad (real-life married couple Jamie Denbo and John Ross Bowie): A domineering couple who are obsessed with winning their daughter's beauty pageants, to the extent of painting her with printer toner (the mother states that the father works at "a computer store" frequently and doesn't know anything about pageants), whitening her lips like a blackface minstrel to win the 'Little Miss Nubian' pageant (which Williams' daughter won a couple years prior), or attempting to illegally buy Weigel's son. They often make inappropriate comments about the other young contestants ("Sexy, sexy kids!"). In season 4, they are seen at the local Renaissance Faire trying to stay in character while filing a police report with the deputies.
- Pastor Dave (Ryan Raddatz): A clean-cut looking busker, selling DMT and ecstasy to the youths of Reno.
- Pinky the Drunk Driver (Chelsea Handler): A belligerent drunk driver who claims she has not been drinking.
- Pot Dealer (Matt Besser): A man that calls 911 because his illegal weapons got stolen. In another episode, he is seen calling 911 again because someone came to his house to buy weed when he was not selling it because his "business" is closed on Sundays and claims that the deputies are trespassing. He is then arrested for talking back to them.
- Principal Manderville (Kristina Hayes): A local elementary school principal who usually makes an announcement to the students before the Reno deputies begin their "safety assembly".
- "Reading Ron" (Brian Unger): A children's TV host with a checkered past who attempts to profile the Reno Sheriff's Department on his show, with results that are disastrously inappropriate for the target demographic. He is later forced into rehab following a drug relapse, but retains his job.
- Roadie (David Koechner): A roadie at Steely Dan, Ted Nugent, and Motörhead concerts.
- Seeeeemji (Christina Applegate): Terry's girlfriend, whom the deputies are very surprised to learn is real. The "j" is silent.
- Sergeant Clift (Ryan Stiles): A consultant that the LAPD sends over to help the deputies improve their undercover work because, as Dangle says, "They can smell that we're pigs from a mile away." Clift puts the deputies through acting exercises that backfire horribly when put into practice.
- Sheriff Walter Chechekevitch (Tracey Walter): The deputies' aloof, clueless boss who died after eating a candy bar because he was allergic to the peanuts it contained. He had made so few appearances to the Sheriff's Department that they never remember his name. Despite this, he is fondly remembered as the best Polish Sheriff Reno has ever had. (Junior amended: "Not the best, but pretty good for a Polack.")
- "Spanish Mike" Alverez a.k.a. "Captain Duane Hernandez" (Oscar Nunez); and Sammy Heung a.k.a. Lt. Suzy Kim (Cathy Shim): "Hernandez" and "Kim" are con artists who pose as Department of Homeland Security agents to get their hands on the Reno Sheriff's Department's money and evidence in the two-part first season episode "Terrorist Training". Wiegel falls for Hernandez and Suzy Kim turns out to be a man in the plot arc. Hernandez is later apprehended and held under close arrest, but makes every effort to seduce the female deputies and escape.
- Steed Lankershim (Timothy Brennen): Johnson's criminal boyfriend, a repeat felon and drug user.
- Steve Marmella (Jack Plotnick): A sexual pervert who specializes in exposing himself and tricking young women and girls into unknowingly touching his penis. As of season 5, he is under house arrest, which does surprisingly little to deter his activities. He is often seen "working" at a carnival. Steve has been convicted of violating Megan's Law and his front yard features a sign to this effect that he frequently defaces to conceal his registry.
- Deputy Patrick Bates (Jack Plotnick): A once-promising new recruit whom Dangle accidentally shot in the head on his first day, rendering him mentally-challenged and unable to walk. The department avoids paying a huge settlement by letting him return and assigning him to phone duty (using a Fisher-Price phone).
- Stevie (Brian Posehn): The Reno medical examiner and coroner. In season 4, he is arrested for being intoxicated on the job: after Junior asks him "Are you stoned right now?" he laughingly replies, "On pot? Oh yeah!" and is cuffed and led out of the exam room. Just two episodes later, he is back on the job.
- Student Driver (Simon Helberg): In season 2, Garcia and Jones pull him over during his driving test. After they give him field sobriety tests and threaten to take him to jail, he grabs both officers' weapons and shouts "You're not stopping me from getting my license!" He then orders them into their squad car's trunk and backs it into the curb before pulling away, braking erratically. Helberg appears in another episode as a Jewish teen who claims his mother has given him a blank check to hire a Jewish hooker to help him become a man on his birthday.
- Theoretical Criminal (Keegan-Michael Key): A criminal with a lisp who frequently calls the Reno Sheriff's Department to report crimes he claims he did not commit, or to show the deputies illegal items he has "found". He often says, "Hypothetically speaking, If I did perpetrate the crime, if I had done it, what would the repercussions be?" The deputies play along, but always end up arresting him.
- T.T. (Niecy Nash): A braless and hysterical woman, T.T. is always featured with a unibrow and pronounced front teeth, despite her face being blurred. T.T. is usually depicted creating various public disturbances by shouting about imaginary events. Deputies have responded to her public disturbances in a church, a store, and even an alleyway on Halloween. T.T. claims that police batons remind her of her father because they are skinny and black.
- Terry Bernadino, a.k.a. Terry Jaspermans (Nick Swardson): A roller skate-wearing, questionably-but-presumably homosexual, substance-addicted prostitute, who always has his midriff on display. Terry is usually seen in jail, local establishments like Tacos, Tacos, Tacos, Tacos (a local taco restaurant), or various street corners. Terry is most frequently found soliciting prostitution and looking for johns. When confronted by the deputies, he typically provides implausible explanations. In one instance, he tries to explain providing handjobs as placing oranges in a driver's lap at red lights. In another, he states that he can't be providing sexual services on a roof as claimed, because he has an allergy to roofs.

At the end of Reno 911!: Miami, it is revealed that Terry is tremendously wealthy. Despite his flamboyant homosexuality, he vehemently denies being gay. At one point he introduces the deputies to his fiancee Seeeeemji (pronounced "see-me") who is completely oblivious to Terry's sexuality although, according to Terry, when they get naked together, he vomits and cannot get hard. Terry is the most recurring side character and a fan favorite. He also starred in the short, "A Very Terry Christmas", included in the special features of Swardson's Seriously, Who Farted? DVD.

- Tommy Hawk (Diedrich Bader): An egotistical bounty hunter and reality-television star who is after many of the same fugitives that the deputies are pursuing. He is a parody of Dog the Bounty Hunter's Duane "Dog" Chapman.
- Unnamed Chinese boy (Kit DeZolt): A poor Chinese boy who drives a rickshaw.
- Unnamed couple (real-life married couple Charlie Day and Mary Elizabeth Ellis): An incestuous "white trash" couple who call the police over a domestic dispute where he is threatening to rip the head off her (plastic "squeaky") baby.
- Unnamed Armed Naked Guy at the VFW (Steve Little): An apparently high man with white powder under his nose who is regularly seen naked and holding a gun while making nonsensical statements.
- Unnamed middle-aged insane woman (Wendi McLendon-Covey): Seen pantless, dragging a water heater through the streets.
- Unnamed drunk pantless hooker (played by Natasha Leggero): Fights with Dangle and Kimball about putting her clothes on and tries to evade arrest.
- Unnamed redneck (played by Robert Ben Garant): A local redneck, usually seen with his pants down and his penis in an unusual object (such as a pumpkin or a birdhouse). His only line is an enthusiastic "Woo!" right before running away.
- Virgil Medlock (Damon Jones): The owner of Hotty's, the first corporate sponsor for the police department. He basically owns the department but gives the deputies free wings that make the deputies gassy. He also gives the deputies new vehicles, uniforms, and Miranda warnings. At the end of the episode, he terminates the partnership because he felt it "wasn't working out" with the deputies.

Others

- Danny DeVito (season 2 as himself, Reno 911!: Miami as a district attorney)
- Lisa Lampanelli (season 4) as the minister at Dangle's gay wedding
- Jill-Michele Meleán (season 3 as Maria Garcia; season 6 as Mayor Hernandez's girlfriend)
- Chino XL (season 2)
