= Niecy Nash-Betts =

American actress (born 1970)

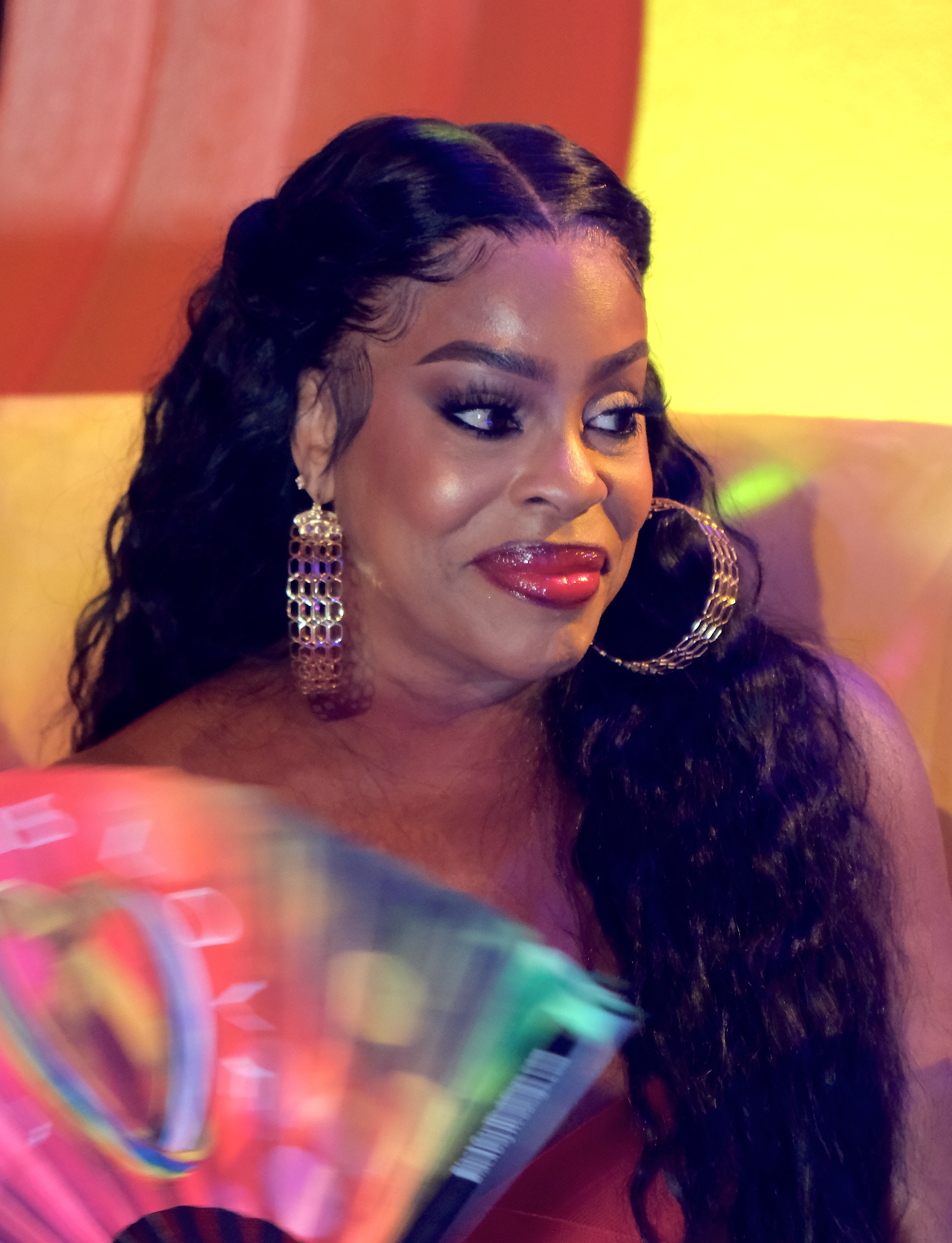
- Nash-Betts at the Essence Festival 2025 Queer Space Event
- Born: Carol Denise Ensley; February 23, 1970 (age 56); Los Angeles, California, U.S.
- Other name: Niecy Nash
- Education: California State University, Dominguez Hills
- Occupation: Actress
- Years active: 1995–present
- Spouses: Don Nash (m. 1994; div. 2007) Jay Tucker (m. 2011; div. 2020) Jessica Betts (m. 2020)
- Children: 3
- Relatives: Chelsie Baham (niece)

Carol Denise Betts (previously Nash, née Ensley; born February 23, 1970), known professionally as Niecy Nash-Betts (/ˈniːsi/), is an American actress. Her career began in the late 1990s, with appearances in the films Boys on the Side (1995) and Cookie's Fortune (1999). She garnered recognition for her portrayal of Deputy Raineesha Williams in the comedy series Reno 911! (2003–09, 2020–22), along with hosting the Style Network show Clean House (2003–10), for which she won a Daytime Emmy Award.

Nash received two Primetime Emmy Award nominations for starring as Denise "Didi" Ortley in the comedy-drama series Getting On (2013–15). She also portrayed Lolli Ballentine in the sitcom The Soul Man (2012–16), and Denise Hemphill in the horror-comedy series Scream Queens (2015–16). From 2017 to 2022, she played Desna Simms in the crime comedy-drama Claws (2017–22), winning a Satellite Award. In 2024 she played Detective Lois Tryon in the horror drama series Grotesquerie (2024) and currently stars as Emerald Greene in the legal drama series All's Fair (2025–present).

Nash collaborated with director Ava DuVernay in the drama films Selma (2014) and Origin (2023), and the miniseries When They See Us (2019), for which she was nominated for another Primetime Emmy Award. Nash also played feminist leader Florynce Kennedy in the miniseries Mrs. America (2020), and starred as Glenda Cleveland in the first season of the Netflix anthology series Monster (2022), winning severals awards, including a Primetime Emmy Award for Outstanding Supporting Actress as well as receiving a Golden Globe and a Screen Actors Guild Award nominations.

== Early life ==
Nash was born Carol Denise Ensley, in Los Angeles, California, on February 23, 1970. She was raised in Compton, California. At the age of five, Nash developed an interest in entertainment after watching actress Lola Falana on television. When she was fifteen, Nash witnessed her mother get shot by an abusive boyfriend. She became a spokesperson for M.A.V.I.S. (Mothers Against Violence In Schools), the organization founded by her mother after the 1993 shooting death of Nash's younger brother, Michael. M.A.V.I.S.'s mission is to inform the public of the violence children encounter on school campuses. Nash graduated from Gardena High School, then later California State University, Dominguez Hills, in Carson, California.

== Career ==
=== Early works ===
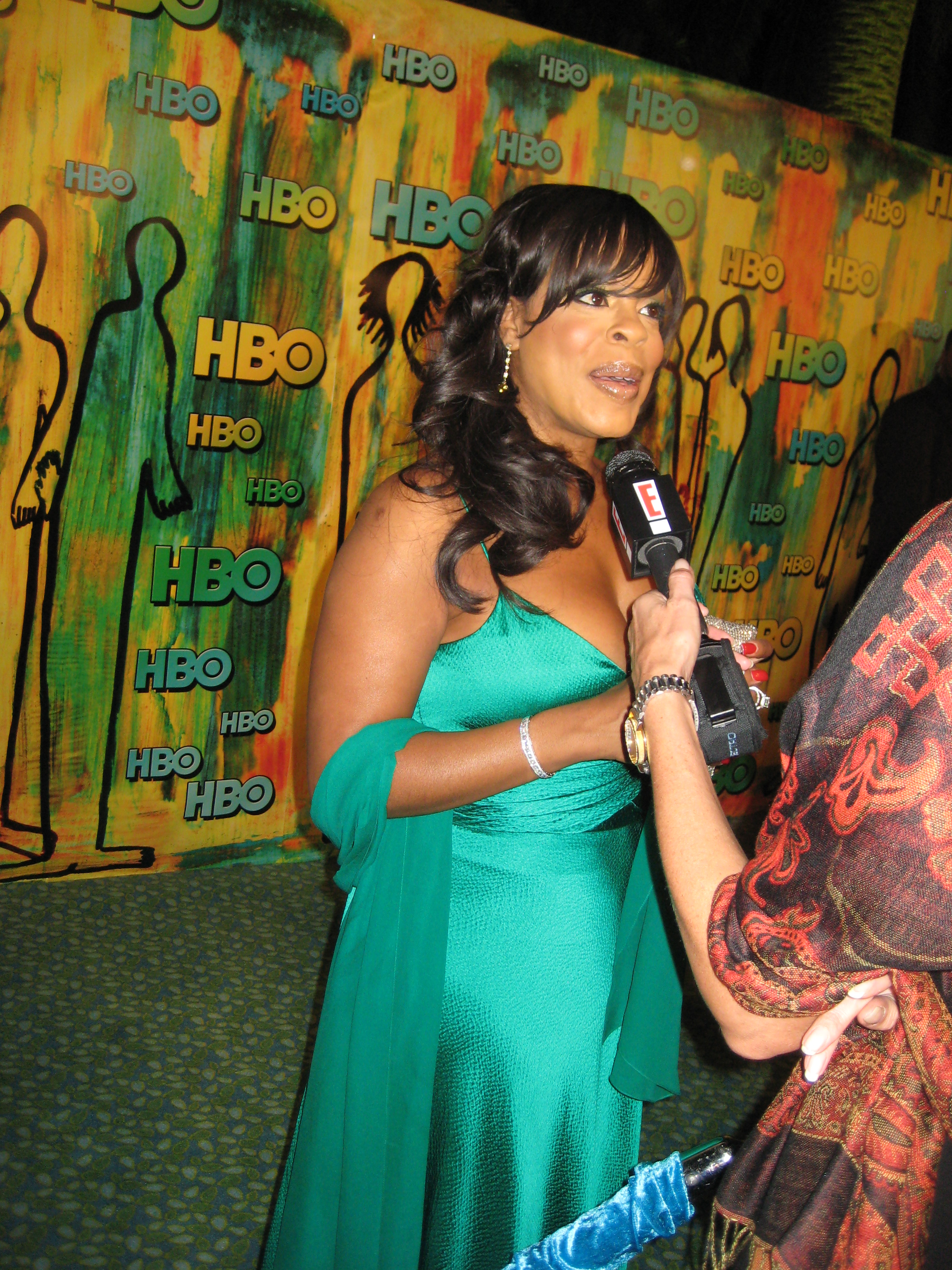
Nash at the 2008 Emmys

Nash made her professional acting debut in the 1995 comedy-drama film, Boys on the Side starring Whoopi Goldberg. On television, she later guest-starred in NYPD Blue, Judging Amy, Reba, Girlfriends, CSI: Crime Scene Investigation, and ER. She also appeared in the 1999 comedy film Cookie's Fortune directed by Robert Altman, and had a recurring role on the CBS drama series City of Angels in 2000.

From 2003 to 2009, she played the roles of Deputy Raineesha Williams and T.T. on the Comedy Central comedy series Reno 911!. She hosted Clean House on the Style Network from 2003 to 2010, as well as providing the voice of Mrs. Boots on the ABC Family animated series Slacker Cats, and starred as Rhonda, opposite Jerry O'Connell, in the short-lived Fox sitcom Do Not Disturb in 2008. She guest-starred on The Bernie Mac Show as Bernie's sister Bonita from 2003 to 2005. Nash won a Daytime Emmy in 2010 as the producer/host of Clean House: The Messiest Home in the Country in the category of Outstanding Special Class Special. On August 4, 2010, Nash announced that she was leaving Clean House, and that the show would continue without her.

Nash appeared on the tenth season of ABC's Dancing with the Stars beginning in March 2010, where she was partnered with Louis van Amstel. On May 11, Nash and van Amstel were eliminated from the competition, taking fifth place. In 2011, she got her own reality show, Leave It To Niecy, on TLC, about her life with her new husband and stepson, but it was quickly cancelled. In that same year she was in a TLC wedding special. She also appeared in the films Code Name: The Cleaner (2007), Reno 911!: Miami (2007), Cook Off! (2007), Not Easily Broken (2009), G-Force (2009), and Trust Me (2013).

=== 2012–present ===
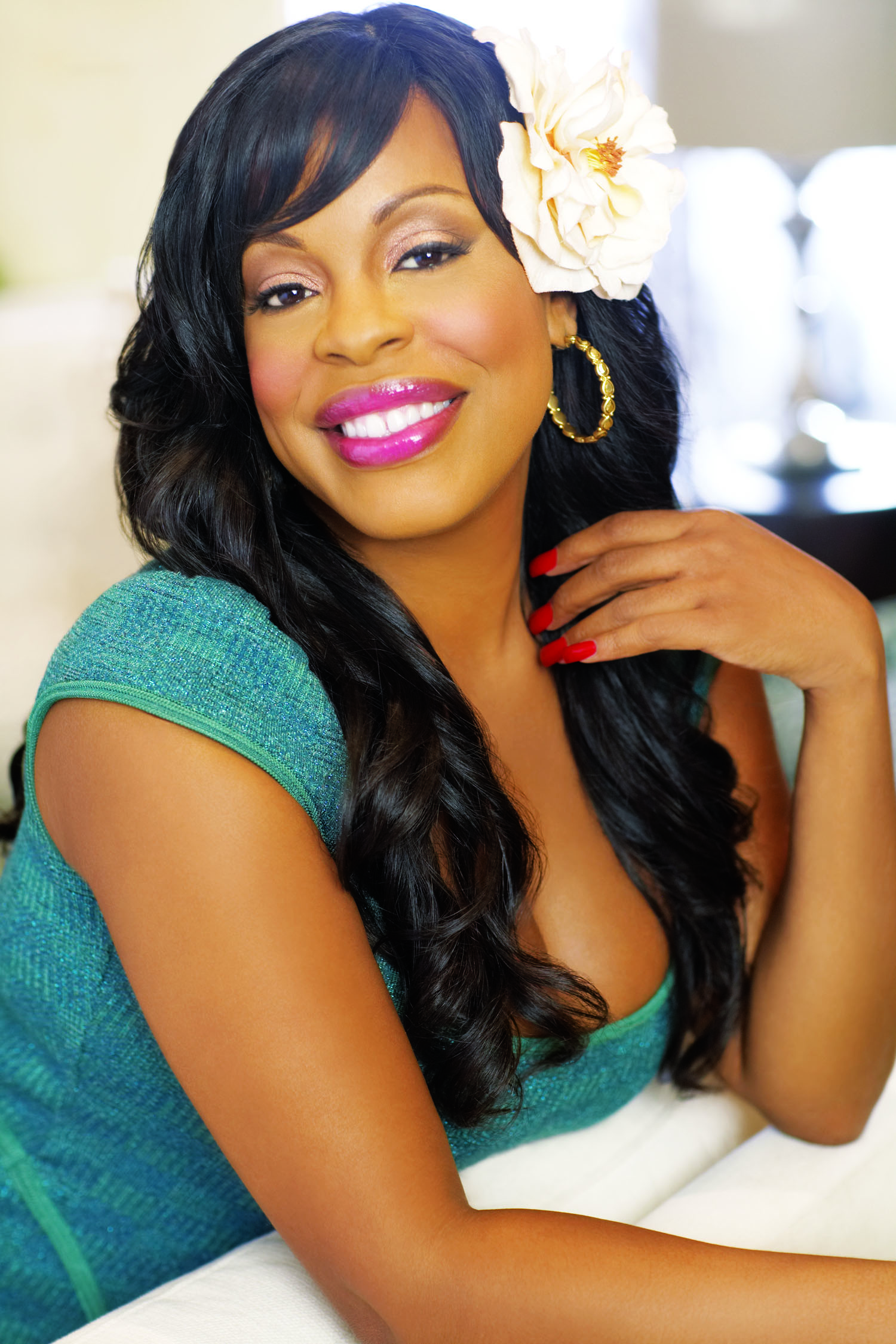
Nash in 2008 commercial for Clorox products

In 2012, Nash began starring opposite Cedric the Entertainer in the TV Land sitcom The Soul Man, a spinoff of Hot in Cleveland. The series ran five seasons and ended in 2016. In 2013, she began starring opposite Laurie Metcalf in the HBO comedy series Getting On. She received a Primetime Emmy Award for Outstanding Supporting Actress in a Comedy Series nomination for her role on the show in 2015 and 2016, as well as a Critics' Choice Television Award for Best Supporting Actress in a Comedy Series in 2016. For her performance, Nash received positive critical reception, followed by more serious roles.

In 2014, Nash played Richie Jean Jackson, the wife of Dr. Sullivan Jackson, in the historical drama film Selma, directed by Ava DuVernay. DuVernay cast Nash after seeing her on the series Getting On. The film received acclaim from critics; on Rotten Tomatoes, the film holds a rating of 99%, based on 205 reviews, with an average rating of 8.7/10. Selma was listed on many critics' top ten lists. Also that year, Nash joined the cast of the Fox comedy series The Mindy Project in a recurring role as Dr. Jean Fishman, a rival of the title character.

From 2015 to 2016, Nash co-starred on the Fox horror-comedy series Scream Queens as a security guard, and then FBI Agent Denise Hemphill. She appeared in another Fox comedy, Brooklyn Nine-Nine, as Andre Braugher's sister. Also in 2016, she was cast in the leading role in the Fox comedy pilot The Enforcers. The pilot, however, was not ordered to series. Nash later had a recurring role as Louise Bell in the Showtime period drama Masters of Sex.

In 2017, Nash was cast in a leading role in the TNT crime comedy-drama series Claws, produced by Rashida Jones, about a South Florida nail salon. Also in 2017, Nash appeared in Mary J. Blige's music video for "Strength of a Woman". For her dramatic turn in Claws, Nash has received critical praise. She received a Satellite Award for Best Actress – Television Series Musical or Comedy, as well as another nomination for the NAACP Image Award for Outstanding Actress in a Comedy Series.

In July 2018, Nash received a star on the Hollywood Walk of Fame in the television category. In August 2018, it was announced that Nash would star in and produce Naked With Niecy Nash, a late-night talk show for TNT. Later that year, Ava DuVernay cast her in the Netflix limited drama series When They See Us. For her performance, she received critical praise and a nomination for Primetime Emmy Award for Outstanding Lead Actress in a Limited Series or Movie.

In 2020, Nash starred in Netflix drama film, Uncorked, directed by Prentice Penny, and had a recurring role in the Netflix comedy-drama Never Have I Ever, created by Mindy Kaling. Also that year, she played civil rights advocate Florynce Kennedy in the Hulu miniseries Mrs. America. Later in 2020, Nash signed on to host her own syndicated daytime talk show for CBS Television Distribution. Nash reprised her role as Deputy Raineesha Williams in the seventh season of Reno 911! which aired on Quibi. She starred in the Lifetime movie Stolen by My Mother: The Kamiyah Mobley Story playing Gloria Williams, her abductor. She also appeared in the 2021 Paramount+ movie Reno 911! The Hunt for QAnon. The eighth season of the series, titled Reno 911! Defunded, premiered on The Roku Channel in February 2022. During season five of The Masked Singer, Nash served as a guest host while regular series host Nick Cannon recovered from COVID-19. On April 28, 2021, Fox announced that it had ordered a revival of Don't Forget the Lyrics with Nash as host. It premiered on May 23, 2022.

Nash guest-starred on two episodes of The Rookie, titled "Simone" and "Enervo", which served as a backdoor pilot centered on her character and aired on April 24 and May 1, 2022. On May 13, 2022, the spinoff, titled The Rookie: Feds, was ordered. The series premiered on September 27, 2022. In July 2022, Nash signed a first-look television deal with Entertainment One. Also that year, she played the title character's mother in the drama film, Beauty.

In late 2022, Nash starred as Glenda Cleveland in the Netflix true-crime limited series Dahmer – Monster: The Jeffrey Dahmer Story. She received positive reviews for her performance. She won the Primetime Emmy Award for Outstanding Supporting Actress in a Limited or Anthology Series or Movie, Critics' Choice Television Award for Best Supporting Actress in a Movie/Miniseries, and the NAACP Image Award for Outstanding Actress in a Television Movie, Mini-Series or Dramatic Special. Additionally, she received nominations for the Screen Actors Guild Award for Outstanding Performance by a Female Actor in a Miniseries or Television Movie and the Golden Globe Award for Best Supporting Actress – Series, Miniseries or Television Film. The following year, she starred in the biographical drama film Origin by Ava DuVernay, based on the life of Isabel Wilkerson. It premiered at the 80th Venice International Film Festival on September 6, 2023, and began a limited theatrical release in January 2024. In June of 2023, Nash was honored as The Hollywood Reporter's Raising Our Voices Trailblazer at the second annual Raising Our Voices luncheon.

In May 2025, it was announced that Nash would be one of the grand marshals at the L.A. Pride parade.

== Personal life ==
In February 1993, Nash's brother Michael Ensley was shot and killed at the age of 17 by a 16-year-old gunman at Reseda High School in California. In the aftermath, Nash began telling jokes to help her mother cope with depression. "That is when I knew I had a gift to do comedy. I decided I was going to go out and spread this around as a means to help the other people who are suffering."

Nash was married for 13 years to Don Nash, an ordained minister. They filed for divorce in June 2007, and have three children together.

In September 2010, Nash became engaged to Jay Tucker. Nash participated in a TLC reality show that followed the preparations for the wedding. On May 28, 2011, they were married at the Church Estate Vineyard in Malibu. On October 30, 2019, Nash announced her pending divorce from Tucker via Instagram. On June 21, 2020, the divorce was finalized.

On August 29, 2020, Nash married singer Jessica Betts, whom Nash refers to as her "hersband". Nash has not elected to label herself or identify with any sexual orientation. She said in an appearance on The Ellen DeGeneres Show that she did not feel that she was "coming out" as she was not sexually repressed prior to her marriage to Betts.

Nash-Betts is an honorary member of Zeta Phi Beta Sorority, Incorporated. She was inducted into the Alpha Omega Chapter on July 11, 2026 at the Grand Boule in Nashville, Tennessee.

== Filmography ==
=== Film ===
Year	Title	Role	Notes
1995	Boys on the Side	Woman at Diner	
1999	Cookie's Fortune	Wanda Carter	
1999	The Bachelor	African-American Bride	
2003	Malibu's Most Wanted	Gladys	
2004	Hair Show	Debra	
2005	Jepardee!	Keisha Jenkins	Short film
2005	Guess Who	Naomi	
2005	Here Comes Peter Cottontail: The Movie	Mama Robin	Voice
2007	Code Name: The Cleaner	Jacuzzi	
2007	Reno 911!: Miami	Deputy Raineesha Williams	
2007	Cook Off!	Ladybug Briggs	
2008	Horton Hears a Who!	Miss Yelp	Voice
2008	Mrs. C	Anesthesiologist	Short film
2009	Why We Laugh: Black Comedians on Black Comedy	Herself	
2009	Not Easily Broken	Michelle	
2009	The Proposal	Stewardess	Cameo appearance
2009	G-Force	Rosalita	
2013	Trust Me	Angie	
2013	Nurse 3D	Regina	
2014	Walk of Shame	Bus Driver	
2014	Selma	Richie Jean Jackson	
2017	Downsizing	Leisureland Salesperson	
2020	Uncorked	Sylvia	
2022	Beauty	Beauty’s Mother	
2023	Origin	Marion Russell Wilkerson	

=== Television ===
Year	Title	Role	Notes
1996	Party of Five	Nurse	Episode: "Spring Breaks: Part 1"
1998	Rude Awakening	Gaynielle	Episode: "Naked Again"
1999	Malcolm & Eddie	Jackie	Episode: "B.S. I Still Love You"
1999	Time of Your Life	Clerk	Episode: "The Time She Came to New York"
2000	City of Angels	Eveline Walker	Recurring cast (season 1)
2000	Popular	Teacher	Episode: "Hard on the Outside, Soft in the Middle"
2000	Any Day Now	Miss Lavonde	Episode: "Lighten Up, Rene"
2001	Rude Awakening	Caller #3	Episode: "Altar Ego"
2001	Kate Brasher	June/Jane Clark	Episode: "Tracy"
2001	One on One	Darla	Episode: "Fifteen Candles"
2001	That's Life	Darlene	Episode: "Plus One" & "Idiots"
2001	NYPD Blue	Tonya Dunbar	Episode: "Baby Love"
2001	Judging Amy	Letitia Sitz	Episode: "Beating the Bounds"
2002	Reba	Maya	Episode: "He's Having a Baby"
2002	Girlfriends	LaShelle	Episode: "Just Dessert"
2002	For Your Love	Clerk	Episode: "The Blast from the Past"
2002	Presidio Med	Nurse	Episode: "Milagros"
2002	CSI: Crime Scene Investigation	Snuff film processor	Episode: "Snuff"
2003	That's So Raven	Madame Cassandra / Shirley	Episode: "Psychics Wanted"
2003	ER	Judith Anderson	Episode: "Missing"
2003	Kid Notorious	Tollie Mae (voice)	Main cast
2003–05	The Bernie Mac Show	Benita	Guest cast (season 2-4)
2003–09, 2020–22	Reno 911!	Raineesha Williams	Main cast
2003–10	Clean House	Herself/host	Main cast (season 1-9)
2004	Half & Half	Carla	Episode: "The Big Mother of a Mother's Day Rides Again Episode"
2004	Monk	Varla Davis	Episode: "Mr. Monk and the Girl Who Cried Wolf"
2005	My Name Is Earl	Rhonda Gibbs	Episode: "Cost Dad the Election"
2006	The Boondocks	Cookie Freeman (voice)	Episode: "Wingmen"
2006	Minoriteam	Fasto's Mama (voice)	Recurring cast
2007	Kathy Griffin: My Life on the D-List	Herself	Episode: "Dating for Publicity"
2007–09	Slacker Cats	Mrs. Boots (voice)	Recurring cast
2007–13	American Dad!	Additional voices (voice)	Recurring cast
2008	MADtv	Herself	Episode #14.1
2008	The Mighty B!	Miriam Breedlove (voice)	2 episodes
2008	Chocolate News	Trina Harper	Episode: "Episode 2"
2008	Do Not Disturb	Rhonda Peet	Main cast
2009	The Real Housewives of Atlanta	Herself	Episode: "New Attitude, Same ATL"
2009–10	Messiest Home	Herself	Recurring cast
2010	New Now Next Awards	Herself/host	TV special
2010	RuPaul's Drag Race	Herself / guest judge	Episode: "The Snatch Game"
2010	Brandy & Ray J: A Family Business	Herself	Episode: "It's a Celebration"
2010	Dancing with the Stars	Herself	Contestant (season 10)
2010	Gary Unmarried	Charleen	Episode: "Gary Tries to Find Something for Mitch" & "Gary Unmarried?"
2010	The Cleveland Show	Janet (voice)	Episode: "Another Bad Thanksgiving"
2011	Way Black When: Primetime	Herself/host	Episode #1.6
2011	Annual Trumpet Awards	Herself/host	TV special
2011	The LeBrons	Gloria (voice)	Main cast
2012	Celebrity Wife Swap	Herself	Episode: "Niecy Nash/Tina Yothers"
2012	Leave It to Niecy	Herself	Main cast
2012	Let's Talk About Love	Herself	Main cast
2012–16	The Soul Man	Lolli Ballentine	Main cast
2013	Life After	Herself	Episode: "Sheryl Lee Ralph: Life After Dreamgirls"
2013	Who Wants to Be a Millionaire	Herself	Episode: "Celebrity Week 4 & 5"
2013	Hollywood Game Night	Herself/panelist	Episode: "America's Got Game Night"
2013	Ben and Kate	Roz	Episode: "Father-Daughter Dance"
2013–15	Getting On	Denise "Didi" Ortley	Main cast
2014	Exhale	Herself	Episode: "What Is Love?"
2014	Family Game Night	Herself	Episode: "Celebrity Edition: Niecy Nash"
2014	Bad Teacher	Carla	Episode: "What's Old Is New"
2014	The Mindy Project	Jean Fishman	Recurring cast (season 3)
2015	Celebrity Family Feud	Herself	Episode: "Cheryl Hines vs. Niecy Nash/Duck Dynasty vs. Katy Mixon"
2015	Hollywood Game Night	Herself / celebrity player	Episode: "Cedric Gives Niecy a Hand"
2015–16	TripTank	Additional voices (voice)	Recurring cast
2015–16	Scream Queens	Denise Hemphill	Recurring cast
2016	The $100,000 Pyramid	Herself / celebrity player	Episode: "Kevin Pollak vs. Niecy Nash"
2016	Brooklyn Nine-Nine	Debbie Holt	Episode: "The Cruise"
2016	Masters of Sex	Louise Bell	Recurring cast (season 4)
2016	As the Fire Pit Burns	Jennifer Bowen-Brown	Main cast
2016–19	Match Game	Herself / celebrity player	Recurring guest
2017	Drop the Mic	Herself	Episode: "Niecy Nash vs. Cedric the Entertainer"
2017	Modern Family	Joan	Episode: "All Things Being Equal"
2017	Angie Tribeca	Pandora	Episode: "Go Get 'Em, Tiger"
2017–22	Claws	Desna Simms	Main cast
2018	Kevin Hart: What the Fit	Herself	Episode: "Firefighting with Niecy Nash"
2018	Fresh Off the Boat	Wilhelmina	Episode: "Big Baby"
2018	A.P. Bio	Kim	Episode: "Teacher Jail"
2018	Speechless	Kiki	Episode: "J-i-Jingle T-h-Thon"
2018–19	Family Guy	Sheila (voice)	Recurring cast (season 17), guest (season 18)
2019	Black Girls Rock!	Herself/host	TV special
2019	When They See Us	Delores Wise	Main cast
2019	Marvel Rising: Playing with Fire	Shocktress (voice)	Episode: "Playing with Fire"
2020	Behind Her Faith	Herself	Episode: "Niecy Nash"
2020	I Can See Your Voice	Herself/panelist	2 episodes
2020	The Masked Singer	Herself / guest panelist	Episode: "The Group A Finals - The Masked Frontier"
2020	Celebrity Game Face	Herself	Episode: "Sweatsuit Charades and Donut Holes"
2020	A Million Little Things	Gloria	Episode: "The Kiss"
2020	Mrs. America	Flo Kennedy	Recurring cast
2020	Stolen by My Mother: The Kamiyah Mobley Story	Gloria Williams	TV movie
2020–23	Never Have I Ever	Jamie Ryan	Recurring cast; 16 episodes
2021	The Masked Singer	Herself	Host (season 5)
2021	GLAAD Media Awards	Herself/host	TV special
2021	Q-Force	Caryn (voice)	Recurring cast
2021	The Problem with Jon Stewart	Thelma	Episode: "Guns"
2021	Reno 911!: The Hunt for QAnon	Raineesha Williams	TV movie
2022	About Last Night	Herself	Episode: "Casey Wilson/Niecy Nash/Damion Lee/Sydel Curry Lee"
2022	Don't Forget the Lyrics!	Herself/host	TV series; also executive producer
2022	Finding Your Roots	Herself	Episode #9.3
2022	Celebrity Game Face	Herself	Episode: "Tournament of Losers"
2022	Monster	Glenda Cleveland	(season 1)
2022	Reno 911!: It's a Wonderful Heist	Raineesha Williams	TV movie
2022–23	The Rookie	Simone Clark	Recurring cast (season 4-5)
2022–23	The Rookie: Feds	Simone Clark	Main cast
2022–24	Don't Forget the Lyrics!	Herself/host	Main host
2023	Finding Your Roots	Herself	Episode: "Secret Lives"
2023	Celebrity Family Feud	Herself	Episode #10.8
2023	Agent Elvis	Bertie (voice)	Main cast
2023	Human Resources	Hope (voice)	Recurring cast (season 2)
2024	We Are Family	Herself	Episode: "Hey Mama!"
2024	Grotesquerie	Lois Tryon	Main cast
2025–present	All's Fair	Emerald Greene	Main cast; also executive producer
2026	The Hunting Party	Erica Burke	Episode: "Adrian Gallo"

=== Music videos ===
Year	Title	Artist	Role
2017	"Family Feud"	Jay-Z featuring Beyoncé	Herself
2019	"My Type (Claws Remix)"	Saweetie	Desna Simms
2024	"To the Moon"	Meghan Trainor	Boss

=== Video games ===
Year	Title	Role
2004	Spider-Man 2	Additional Voices (voice)

== Awards and nominations ==
=== Major associations ===
==== Emmy Awards ====
Year	Category	Work	Result	Ref.
Daytime Emmy Awards
2009	Outstanding Lifestyle Program	Clean House	Nominated	
2009	Outstanding Special Class Special	Clean House	Nominated	
2010	Outstanding Lifestyle Program	Clean House	Nominated	
2010	Outstanding Special Class Special	Clean House	Won	
Primetime Emmy Awards
2015	Outstanding Supporting Actress in a Comedy Series	Getting On	Nominated	
2016	Outstanding Supporting Actress in a Comedy Series	Getting On	Nominated	
2019	Outstanding Lead Actress in a Limited Series or Movie	When They See Us	Nominated	
2023	Outstanding Supporting Actress in a Limited or Anthology Series or Movie	Dahmer – Monster: The Jeffrey Dahmer Story	Won	

==== Golden Globe Awards ====
Year	Category	Work	Result	Ref.
2023	Best Supporting Actress - Television	Dahmer – Monster: The Jeffrey Dahmer Story	Nominated	

==== Screen Actors Guild Awards ====
Year	Category	Work	Result	Ref.
2023	Outstanding Actress in a Miniseries or Movie	Dahmer – Monster: The Jeffrey Dahmer Story	Nominated	

=== Other awards and honors ===
Association	Year	Category	Work	Result	Ref.
African-American Film Critics Association	2019	Best Ensemble	When They See Us	Won	
African-American Film Critics Association	2023	Best Actress	Dahmer – Monster: The Jeffrey Dahmer Story	Won	
Astra TV Awards	2024	Best Supporting Actress in a Limited Series or Streaming Movie	Dahmer – Monster: The Jeffrey Dahmer Story	Won	
Black Film Critics Circle	2014	Best Ensemble	Selma	Won	
Black Reel Awards	2014	Best Ensemble	Selma	Won	
Black Reel Awards	2018	Outstanding Actress in a Drama Series	Claws	Nominated	
Black Reel Awards	2019	Outstanding Actress in a Drama Series	Claws	Nominated	
Black Reel Awards	2019	Outstanding Actress in a Limited Series or Movie	When They See Us	Won	
Black Reel Awards	2023	Outstanding Supporting Performance in a TV Movie/Limited Series	Dahmer – Monster: The Jeffrey Dahmer Story	Won	
Celebration of Cinema and Television	2025	Groundbreaker Award	Grotesquerie	Won	
Critics' Choice Movie Award	2014	Best Acting Ensemble	Selma	Nominated	
Critics' Choice Super Awards	2023	Best Actress in a Horror Series, Limited Series or Made-for-TV Movie	Dahmer – Monster: The Jeffrey Dahmer Story	Nominated	
Critics' Choice Super Awards	2024	Best Actress in a Horror Series, Limited Series or Made-for-TV Movie	Grotesquerie	Nominated	
Critics' Choice Television Awards	2016	Best Supporting Actress in a Comedy Series	Getting On	Nominated	
Critics' Choice Television Awards	2020	Best Supporting Actress in a Miniseries or Movie	When They See Us	Nominated	
Critics' Choice Television Awards	2023	Best Supporting Actress in a Movie/Miniseries	Dahmer – Monster: The Jeffrey Dahmer Story	Won	
Denver Film Festival	2025	CinemaQ LaBahn Ikon Film Award	Herself	Honoree	
GLAAD Media Awards	2024	Stephen F. Kolzak Award	Herself	Won	
Gracie Awards	2009	Outstanding Supporting Actress in a Comedy Series	Reno 911!	Won	
NAACP Image Awards	2014	Outstanding Actress in a Comedy Series	The Soul Man	Nominated	
NAACP Image Awards	2015	Outstanding Actress in a Comedy Series	The Soul Man	Nominated	
NAACP Image Awards	2017	Outstanding Actress in a Comedy Series	The Soul Man	Nominated	
NAACP Image Awards	2019	Outstanding Actress in a Comedy Series	Claws	Nominated	
NAACP Image Awards	2020	Outstanding Actress in a Television Movie or Series	When They See Us	Won	
NAACP Image Awards	2023	Outstanding Actress in a Television Series	Dahmer – Monster: The Jeffrey Dahmer Story	Won	
Online Film Critics Society	2016	Best Supporting Actress in a Comedy Series	Getting On	Nominated	
Online Film Critics Society	2020	Best Ensemble in a Motion Picture or Limited Series	When They See Us	Won	
Online Film Critics Society	2020	Best Actress in a Motion Picture or Limited Series	When They See Us	Nominated	
Online Film Critics Society	2023	Best Supporting Actress in a Motion Picture, Limited or Anthology Series	Dahmer – Monster: The Jeffrey Dahmer Story	Nominated	
Satellite Awards	2018	Best Actress - Television Series Musical or Comedy	Claws	Won	
Satellite Awards	2019	Best Actress - Television Series Musical or Comedy	Claws	Nominated	
Satellite Awards	2019	Best Actress - Miniseries or Television Movie	When They See Us	Nominated	
Shorty Awards	2019	Storyteller of the Year	Herself	Nominated	
Women's Image Network Awards	2020	Best Actress Television Movie/Limited Series	Stolen by My Mother: The Kamiyah Mobley Story	Nominated	
Washington D.C. Area Film Critics Association	2014	Best Ensemble	Selma	Nominated	
