= Federal Correctional Institution, Aliceville =

Low-security prison in Alabama, US

Coordinates: 33.175886°N 88.193053°W

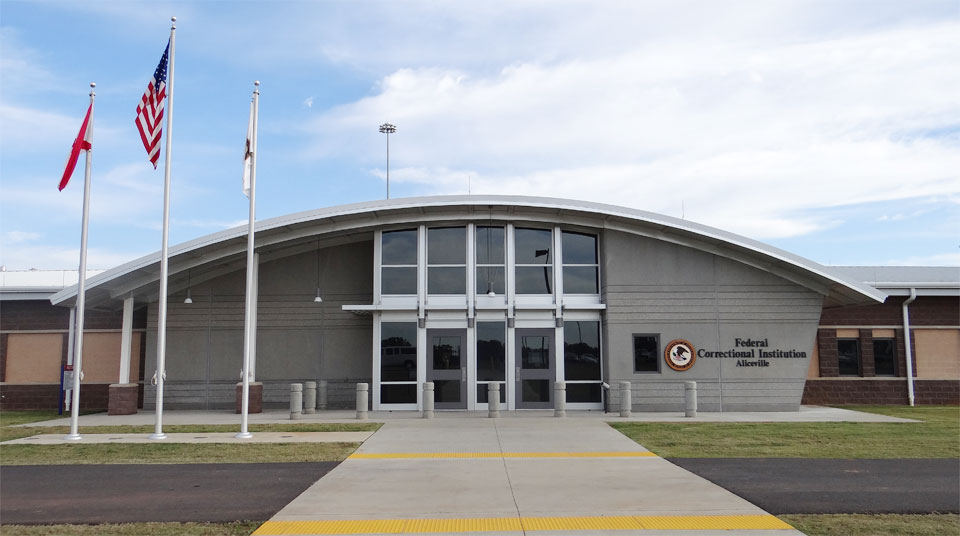
- Interactive map of Federal Correctional Institution, Aliceville
- Location: Pickens County, Alabama
- Status: Operational
- Security class: Low security (with minimum security prison camp)
- Population: 1508
- Opened: 2013
- Managed by: Federal Bureau of Prisons
- Warden: K. Neeley

The Federal Correctional Institution, Aliceville (FCI Aliceville) is a low-security United States federal prison for female inmates in Alabama. It is operated by the Federal Bureau of Prisons, a division of the United States Department of Justice. It is located in unincorporated Pickens County, between Aliceville and Pickensville, and also includes a satellite prison camp for minimum-security inmates.

FCI Aliceville is the first federal women's prison to be established in Alabama.

== History ==
Construction on FCI Aliceville began in 2008.

FCI Aliceville became operational in 2013. Aliceville public officials approved the project with the support of residents who hope that the facility would provide jobs and boost local businesses. The town's population is about 2,500, with unemployment near 11 percent, well above the national average. Aliceville officials estimate the facility will generate between 700 and 1,000 trips per day, which will lead to new hotels, restaurants and gas stations being opened. The medium-security prison is expected to house 1,400 female inmates and employ between 320 and 350 people when it reaches full operating capacity. However, 40 percent of those jobs will go to existing federal prison employees. The Bureau of Prisons has already transferred female inmates to FCI Aliceville from FCI Danbury, which is being converted back to an all-male facility.

Pickens County, previously losing population, became the fastest growing county in Alabama in 2014 because of the installation of the prison.

== Location and facility ==
The prison is on a 650-acre (260 ha) plot of land along Alabama State Route 14, in southwest unincorporated Pickens County. The prison is about 2.5 miles (4.0 km) north of Aliceville, and between Aliceville and Pickensville. The local area is served by the Aliceville post office. It is approximately 55 miles (89 km) west of Tuscaloosa, Alabama, and 35 miles (56 km) southeast of Columbus, Mississippi.

The prison, managed by two construction companies, had a scheduled cost of $185 million. Caddell and W.G. Yates & Sons, of Montgomery, Alabama and Philadelphia, Mississippi, respectively, worked on the project.

== Programs and services ==
FCI Aliceville offers a literacy program designed to help inmates develop foundational knowledge and skills in reading, math, written expression, and to prepare inmates for GED classes. Inmates with low-English proficiency are required to take ESL classes. Adult continuing education, college correspondence programs and parenting classes are also available. A Release Preparation Program is geared towards preparing inmates for their return to society. Inmate tutors teach skills including job searching, resume writing, budgeting and buying a home.

== Notable inmates (current and former) ==
Inmate Name	Register Number	Photo	Status	Details
Jordan Linn Graham	12764-046		Serving a 30-year sentence; scheduled for release on November 10, 2039.	Pleaded guilty on December 12, 2013, to second-degree murder for luring her new husband, Cody Johnson, to Glacier National Park in Montana and pushing him off a cliff to his death on July 7, 2013.
Shannon Conley	40384-013		Served a four-year sentence; released on September 29, 2017.	Colorado resident and Muslim convert; pleaded guilty in 2014 to conspiracy to provide material support to the Islamic State for attempting to travel to Syria to engage in violent jihad; one of the first Americans to be sentenced for conspiracy to support the Islamic State.
Elaine Brown	03924-049		35-year sentence vacated; sentenced to time served; released February 28, 2020.	Sovereign citizen movement member; convicted in 2009 of stockpiling bombs, handguns and high-powered rifles during an 8-month standoff with authorities attempting to apprehend her and her husband, Ed Brown, for a 2007 tax evasion conviction.
Bernetta Willis	11880-002		Was serving a 43-year sentence. Compassionately released on March 14, 2023.	Convicted in 2007 of masterminding a large-scale conspiracy involving the filing of false claims and theft of federal funds intended for Hurricane Katrina disaster relief; received the longest sentence ever for Hurricane Katrina fraud.
Alice Marie Johnson	14873-076		Released on June 6, 2018, after her life sentence was commuted by President Donald Trump.	Involved in the distribution of 3 tons of cocaine throughout Memphis.
Annugetta Pettway	91667-054		Released on April 14, 2021.	Kidnapper of Carlina White.
Catherine Pugh	65148-037		Released on April 1, 2021, after being transferred to a halfway house in Baltimore.	Former Mayor of Baltimore. Sentenced for "Healthy Holly" book fraud scheme.
Reta Mays	03105-509		Serving seven consecutive life sentences.	Convicted in 2020 of seven counts of second degree murder and one count of assault with intent to commit murder. She injected the victims at the Louis A. Johnson VA Medical Center in Clarksburg, WV with lethal amounts of insulin.
Angela Johnson	08337-029		Serving a life sentence.	The first woman sentenced to death by a United States federal jury since the 1950s. She was sentenced to death for her role in the murders of five people in 1993. She was re-sentenced to life without parole in December 2014. Her accomplice, Dustin Honken, was sentenced to death and executed on July 17, 2020.

== See also ==
- List of U.S. federal prisons
- Federal Bureau of Prisons
- Incarceration of women in the United States
