= Kidnapping of Kamiyah Mobley =

1998 kidnapping in Florida, United States

Kamiyah Mobley
- Born: Kamiyah Teresiah Tasha Mobley; July 10, 1998 (age 28); Jacksonville, Florida, U.S.
- Disappeared: July 10, 1998; Jacksonville, Florida, U.S.
- Status: Recovered alive after 18 years
- Other name: Alexis Manigo
- Parents: Craig Aiken (father); Shanara Mobley (mother)

Kamiyah Teresiah Tasha Mobley was abducted from a Florida hospital on July 10, 1998, when she was only eight hours old. In January 2017, she was found alive in Walterboro, South Carolina. DNA testing proved that she was not the daughter of Gloria Williams, her abductor. She had been raised under the name Alexis Kelli Manigo.

On June 8, 2018, Williams was sentenced to 18 years in prison for the kidnapping. Kamiyah's biological mother in Florida, Shanara Mobley, was awarded US$1.5 million after settling a lawsuit against the former University Medical Center. She has since had three other children.

== Abduction ==
Kamiyah Mobley was born on July 10, 1998, to 16-year-old Shanara "Starr" Mobley. She was abducted eight hours after birth by a woman impersonating a nurse, reportedly dressed in hospital attire, who entered the room, assisted and conversed with the mother, and later walked out of the room with Kamiyah in her arms. Employees initially believed that the woman who kidnapped Kamiyah was a member of the Mobley family. Shanara was interviewed later, pleading for the return of her daughter.

The abductor was believed to be between 25 and 35 years old, and possibly wore a pair of glasses and a wig. She was dressed in a floral blue smock and green scrub pants. It is known that Gloria Williams, about 33 at the time, later forged documents to create a new identity for Mobley. Williams was in an abusive relationship and had just miscarried a child a week before, which is believed to be her motive for the abduction.

== Investigation and recovery ==
The case made national headlines in 2017 after new tips led investigators to Walterboro, South Carolina. Because there were no photographs taken of Kamiyah before her abduction, a computer-generated composite of her was created to distribute to the media. Distinctive features, such as Mongolian spots and an umbilical hernia, were included in reports. Mobley was swabbed, and a DNA sample taken from Mobley after she was born was matched to a swab taken from the potential match.

After the match was confirmed, Mobley was described as "in good health but overwhelmed". She had been living in South Carolina under the name Alexis Manigo and had since graduated from Colleton County High School. She had been raised alongside Gloria Williams' two other children. In 2015, Mobley became suspicious after trying to apply for a job where she needed her social security card and birth certificate when Williams refused to give it to her. Mobley connected with her biological father and grandmother over FaceTime and planned to reunite with other family members in person.

Her biological father had been incarcerated at the time of her birth for drug possession and delivery, and because he was 19 while Shanara was 15 at the time of Kamiyah's conception.

Williams was arrested in South Carolina and extradited to Florida, where she was charged with kidnapping and interfering with custody. She had a prior history with law enforcement, having previously been charged with check and welfare fraud. Mobley described Williams as "no felon" and insisted that Williams raised her with "everything [she] needed".

In February 2018, Williams pleaded guilty to kidnapping. She admitted she acted alone in the 1998 abduction.

On June 8, 2018, Williams was sentenced to 18 years in prison for the kidnapping of Mobley, who still communicates with Williams and refers to her as her mother. In March 2022, Williams was denied a motion to reduce her sentence to nine years. The plea included a handwritten letter from Mobley in support of the motion, stating "I would like to make it very clear that she is my mother." Williams is pursuing a master's degree in business administration and completing community service while serving her sentence at the Hernando Correctional Institution. She is scheduled for release on July 23, 2032.

== Film adaptation ==
Lifetime announced a film called Stolen by My Mother: The Kamiyah Mobley Story, which aired on January 18, 2020, as part of its "Ripped from the Headlines" feature film. The film stars Rayven Ferrell as Kamiyah Mobley, Niecy Nash as Gloria Williams, and Ta'Rhonda Jones as Shanara Mobley. Robin Roberts serves as the executive producer.

== See also ==
- Child abduction
- List of kidnappings
- Lists of solved missing person cases
- Kidnapping of Carlina White, the case of a child abducted and recovered under similar circumstances
- Zephany Nurse, also abducted and recovered under similar circumstances
