= Kidnapping of Carlina White =

1987 kidnapping in New York City

- Location: New York City, U.S.
- Date: August 4, 1987; 39 years ago
- Attack type: Kidnapping, child abduction
- Victim: Carlina Renae White
- Perpetrator: Annugetta Pettway
- Motive: Desire for a child after multiple miscarriages
- Verdict: Pleaded guilty
- Convictions: Kidnapping
- Sentence: 12 years in prison (released after 9 2/3 years)

Carlina Renae White (born July 15, 1987), also known as Nejdra "Netty" Nance, is an American woman who solved her own kidnapping case and was reunited with her biological parents 23 years after being abducted as an infant from the Harlem Hospital Center in New York City. The case represents one of the longest known gaps in an abduction in which the victim was reunited with the family in the United States. For years she lived with Annugetta Pettway, a woman she believed was her mother. However, she later discovered that Pettway was actually her kidnapper. White was portrayed by Keke Palmer in the Lifetime film Abducted: The Carlina White Story. Upon discovering her kidnapping and her biological parents, she kept her legal name as Carlina White.

== Background ==
Annugetta Pettway had an abusive upbringing, her mother often beating her with belts and extension cords. Pettway was motivated to commit the kidnapping out of a desire for a child after having multiple miscarriages. Pettway spent several weeks in jail in Waterbury, Connecticut as a teenager in 1977 after being charged with larceny.

== Abduction ==
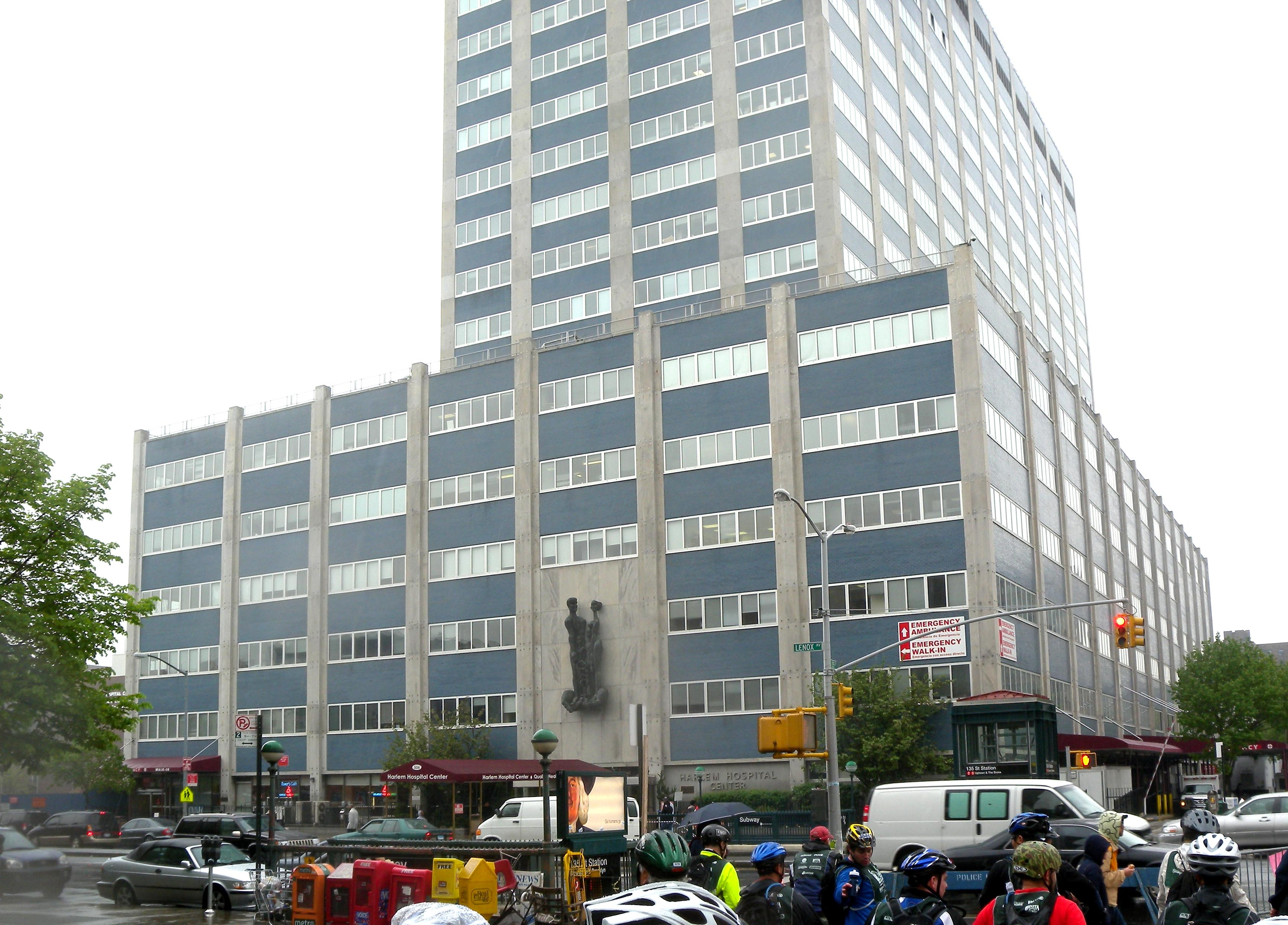
Harlem Hospital Center in Manhattan

Carlina was 19 days old when her parents, Joy White and Carl Tyson, took her to the hospital with a fever of 104 °F (40 °C) on August 4, 1987. She had swallowed fluid during her delivery and had an infection. A woman reportedly dressed as a nurse had comforted the parents at the hospital, but was not a hospital employee. The woman had been seen around the hospital for three weeks prior to the abduction. The baby disappeared during the early morning, around 2 am when the shifts were changing. The hospital had video surveillance, but at the time it was not working. There was no way of knowing what the woman in white looked like except for the description given by Joy White and Carl Tyson. The baby had been receiving intravenous antibiotics when, between 2:30 am and 3:55 am, someone removed the IV line and abducted her. A guard said a woman matching the suspect's description left the hospital at 3:30 am, and that no infant was visible, although the baby could have been concealed in the heavyset woman's smock.

The case was the first known infant abduction from a New York hospital.

== Life as Nejdra Nance ==
Carlina Renae White was raised as Nejdra "Netty" Nance by Annugetta "Ann" Pettway in Bridgeport, Connecticut, just 45 miles from where her parents had lived. Pettway habitually committed petty crimes during White's upbringing, being placed on probation at least three separate times in Connecticut. She also pleaded guilty to embezzlement for stealing cash and clothing from the Hudson Belk where she worked in Raleigh, North Carolina.

In 1998 Pettway gave birth to her son Trevon Teele, who White grew up with and believed was her half brother. White attended Thomas Hooker School and graduated from Warren Harding High School in Bridgeport in 2005. Pettway and White later moved to Atlanta with Pettway's sister. White grew suspicious during her teens that Pettway was not her biological mother, because of her inability to provide a birth certificate.

In 2005, when White was pregnant with her daughter, she requested Pettway obtain her birth certificate so she could get health insurance. Pettway acquired a forged Connecticut birth certificate, which White attempted to use as proof of identity so she could obtain the health insurance, but the officials told her the document was forged.

Later that evening, in a state of shock, White confronted Pettway, who broke down and confessed that she was not White's biological mother. The revelation was not entirely surprising to White as she had begun to notice that she did not share physical traits with Pettway. Pettway lied and told White that she had been abandoned by a drug addict. At age 23, White used websites such as the National Center for Missing and Exploited Children, where she found that the images of the kidnapped Carlina resembled infant photos of herself as Nejdra and those of her daughter, Samani. She called the center's hotline and was able to contact her birth family. DNA profiling confirmed in January 2011 that she was the missing Carlina White.

== Investigation and legal proceedings ==
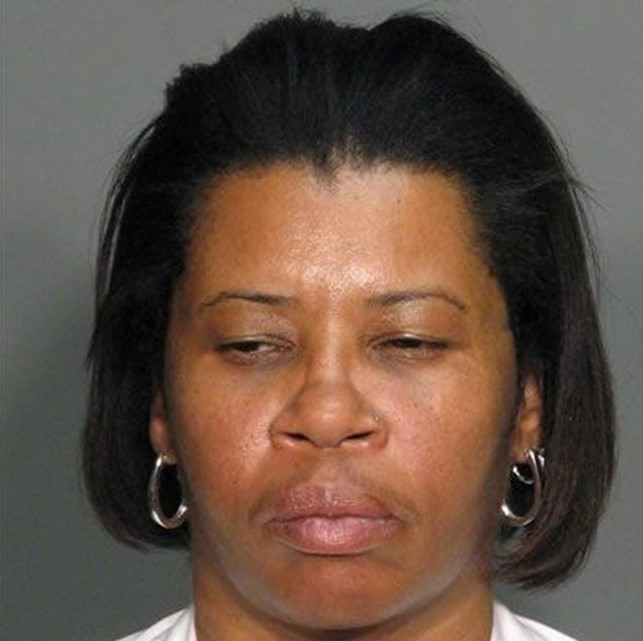
Perpetrator Annugetta Pettway

In 1987, New York City Police Department detectives questioned a woman in Baltimore, who witnesses had identified as having been seen in the hospital, without apparent result.

After the confirmation that Nejdra Nance was really Carlina White, the Federal Bureau of Investigation began a search for Ann Pettway. The statute of limitations for the state kidnapping law had expired in New York, but there is no statute of limitations for the federal law on kidnapping. An arrest warrant for Ann Pettway was issued by the North Carolina Department of Correction on January 21, 2011, for violating her probation from a conviction for attempted embezzlement. White stated, "I just hope that the officials be able to get her in their hands, so we can just hear her side of the story now."

Pettway turned herself in to the FBI office at Bridgeport on the morning of January 23, 2011. She had driven from North Carolina to Connecticut to arrange care for her biological son. Pettway told federal investigators that she kidnapped White because of the stress over whether "she would ever be able to be a parent." after enduring several miscarriages. Pettway did not enter a plea at her arraignment at the U.S. District Court for Southern New York in Manhattan, where she faced between 20 years and life in prison for the kidnapping of a child victim. On February 17, 2011, a federal grand jury indicted Pettway on the kidnapping charge.

On February 10, 2012, Pettway pleaded guilty to a federal kidnapping charge. As part of a plea bargain, the child victim specification of her kidnapping charge was dropped and prosecutors agreed to recommend to the judge a prison sentence of 10 to 12½ years. On July 30, 2012, Judge P. Kevin Castel sentenced Pettway, who was then 50 years old, to 12 years in prison. Her lawyers had asked for leniency, saying Pettway had been severely depressed after suffering from multiple miscarriages and stillbirths. However, the judge said she was selfish and "inflicted a parent's worst nightmare on a couple." Carlina White's father said he thought the sentence was too lenient and that Pettway should've received the amount of time as she'd kept his daughter, 23 years. During the hearing, Pettway apologized, saying "I would like to apologize to the family. It may be rejected, but I am deeply sorry for what I've done. If they don't accept it, it's understandable. I'm here to right my wrong."

Pettway served her sentence in the Federal Correctional Institution, Aliceville in Alabama until she was released on April 14, 2021.

== Aftermath ==
Upon being reunited with her biological parents, Carlina White's attorney advised her to ask them about the cash settlement from the hospital. Joy White and Carl Tyson both confirmed that most of this money had been spent during the years before their reunion, and that a trust fund that had been established was obtainable only if Carlina had been found before the age of 21. Joy White later stated that there had been a falling out over the issue of the money.

In May 2011, public defender Robert Baum said that he met Carlina White during preparations for Ann Pettway's trial and that White agreed to testify on Pettway's behalf. By the following July, White became estranged from her biological parents. However, several months later, she contacted both of her biological parents individually, having had a bit more time to process the situation; she later publicly stated that the issue over settlement funds was "just a misunderstanding". While "Carlina White" is her legal name, as it appears on official documents, she says that she will continue to go by "Netty" in public since it was neither the name her biological parents gave her nor the name given to her by the woman who raised her, but rather is "[the name] I gave myself".

In 2014, White spoke at the Crimes Against Children Conference, the leading national training event for law enforcement professionals working to combat child victimization. As of 2014, she continues to have a relationship with her biological parents.

== See also ==
- Abduction of Kamiyah Mobley, the case of a child abducted and recovered under similar circumstances
- Child abduction
- List of kidnappings
- List of solved missing person cases: 1950–1999
