= Reynoldsville, West Virginia =

- Unincorporated community
- Location within West Virginia Location within the United States
- Coordinates: 39°17′18″N 80°26′05″W
- Country: United States
- State: West Virginia
- County: Harrison
- Elevation: 1,056 ft (322 m)

Population (2020)
  - Total: 339
- Time zone: UTC-5 (Eastern (EST))
  - Summer (DST): UTC-4 (EDT)
- ZIP code: 26422
- Area codes: 304 & 681
- GNIS feature ID: 1555468

Reynoldsville is an unincorporated community in Harrison County, West Virginia, United States. Reynoldsville is 5 miles (8.0 km) west of Clarksburg. Reynoldsville has a post office with ZIP code 26422. As a census-designated place, the population was 339 at the 2020 census.

The community was named after Thomas Philip Reynolds, an early settler.
