= Happily Married (TV series) =

Canadian TV crime comedy-drama series (2020–2024)

- Release poster
- Genre: Crime; Comedy drama; Tragedy
- Created by: François Létourneau
- Starring: François Létourneau; Marilyn Castonguay; Patrice Robitaille; Karine Gonthier-Hyndman
- Composer: Patrick Lavoie
- Country of origin: Canada
- Original language: French
- No. of seasons: 3
- No. of episodes: 28

Production
- Producer: Productions Casablanca
- Running time: 43–44 minutes

Original release
- Network: ICI TOU.TV
- Release: March 6, 2020 – March 1, 2024

Happily Married, also known as This Is How I Love You (French: C'est comme ça que je t'aime), is a Canadian French-language crime comedy drama television series, created and written by François Létourneau (who also stars), which premiered on ICI TOU.TV in 2020 and ran for three seasons until 2024. The series takes place in the summers of 1974, 1975, and 1976, and tells the story of two couples living in Sainte-Foy, Quebec City, Quebec, who fall into crime.

The series' original French title is taken from the 1974 song of the same name by singer Mike Brant, released the same year in which the first season is set.

== Premise ==
Set in Quebec City in the 1970s, the series centres on the Delisles and the Paquettes, two married couples in suburban Sainte-Foy who deal with problems in their marriages by embarking on a crime spree while their children are away at summer camp. The first season takes place in 1974, the second in 1975, and the third in 1976.

=== Framing device ===
The series opens with on-screen text that reads:

"This series has been possible thanks to the invaluable contribution of Gilles Tétreault-Boivin's book

The Gangsters of Sainte-Foy: Chronology of a Love Tragedy

published by True Stories Editions."

This is a storytelling device that frames the plot as a depiction of a "true story", but similar to the film and television series Fargo, it is merely a narrative conceit and not genuinely factual, (Note: The series is presented with a frame story in a mockumentary style, opening on a flash-forward to the bodies of "the four kingpins of Sainte-Foy" floating in the Delisles' pool, whose identities are not revealed until later in the story, and featuring a fictional retired journalist recounting the couples' crimes to camera, along with fake period witnesses, as if for a true crime documentary.) and the book and true crime author do not exist in reality. (Note: There is no established deliberate connection to any real life case or people — despite incidental similarity between the fictional author and a real person named Gilles Tetreault, who wrote a book about an unrelated criminal case in Canada which he was involved in.)

Creator François Létourneau had pitched this idea in order to get the series greenlit, jokingly presenting the story to Radio-Canada as though it had genuinely occurred, and it led to some real-world confusion, media speculation and erroneous news reports that the events were based on a real pair of couples who became involved in crime; however, Létourneau clarified in an interview that it wasn't actually true and was a fictional story, and the series' official FAQ page likewise states plainly that it is fiction and not a true story, with Richard Therrien from the Quebec newspaper Le Soleil describing the series as a fausse histoire vraie ("false true story", or more naturally "fake true story"/"phony true story"). Instead, Létourneau has said the series' premise was inspired by a personal memory: driving his son to summer camp reminded him of his own childhood, during which his parents separated shortly after he returned from a similar camp.

== Cast and characters ==
The series stars François Létourneau and Marilyn Castonguay as Gaétan and Huguette Delisle, and Patrice Robitaille and Karine Gonthier-Hyndman as Serge and Micheline Paquette. Supporting cast members include Sophie Desmarais (as Marie-Josée Bolduc), Rémi-Pierre Paquin (as René Croteau), Jean-François Provençal, René Richard Cyr, Patrick Drolet, Chantal Fontaine, Mani Soleymanlou, Mathieu Gosselin, Steve Laplante, Richardson Zéphir, Agathe Ledoux, Jocelyne Zucco, Charlotte Le Bon, Yves Jacques, Robert Lepage, Xavier Dolan, Pier-Luc Funk, Catherine Trudeau, Hubert Proulx, Gaston Lepage, Fabien Dupuis, Luc Morissette and Michel Perron.

=== Starring ===
- François Létourneau as Gaétan Delisle
- Marilyn Castonguay as Huguette Delisle
- Patrice Robitaille as Serge Paquette
- Karine Gonthier-Hyndman as Micheline Paquette

=== Supporting and guest ===
- Sophie Desmarais as Marie-Josée Bolduc
- Rémi-Pierre Paquin as René Croteau
- Patrick Drolet as Mario, the priest
- Jean-François Provençal as Lucien
- René Richard Cyr as Raymond, "the Boss"
- Chantal Fontaine as Jeannine
- Mani Soleymanlou as Robert "Coco" Bédard
- Charlotte Le Bon as Grazia, "the Praying Mantis"
- Mathieu Gosselin as Eudore "Puff" Côté
- Yves Jacques as the Consigliere
- Robert Lepage as Bernard Laporte, mayor of Sainte-Foy
- Xavier Dolan as chauvinist No. 3
- Pier-Luc Funk as chauvinist No. 2
- Olivier Beauvais-Courchesne as chauvinist No. 1
- Mattis Savard-Verhoeven as chauvinist No. 4
- Catherine Trudeau as Gysèle Truchon
- Sébastien Rajotte as Claude Gingras
- Jocelyne Zucco as Carole
- Alexis Lefebvre as police officer Roland Audet (1974)
- François L'Écuyer as Gérard Boulerice
- Anick Lefebvre as Mrs. Boulerice
- Jimmy Paquet as Dino Bravo
- Claude-Michel Bleau as Robert Bourassa
- Hubert Proulx as one of the Cousineau brothers
- Gaston Lepage as "Croquette" Morency
- Richardson Zéphir as Roland
- Pierre Limoges as Daniel Tremblay
- Fabien Dupuis as Bertrand Boivin
- Luc Morissette as Jacques
- Noémie Leduc-Vaudry as the premier's secretary
- Louise Malouin as Mrs. Vézina
- Évelyne St-Pierre as a waiting-room patient
- Cassandra Lussier as a camp counsellor
- Guy Vaillancourt as Marcel Gosselin (2019 scenes)
- Bastien Roy as François Paquette (1974)
- Sylvain Lamy as François Paquette (2019)
- Édouard B. Larocque as Martin Delisle (1974)
- Christian Cardin as Martin Delisle (2019)
- Élia St-Pierre as Isabelle Paquette (1974)
- Marjolaine Lemieux as Isabelle Paquette (2019)
- Dayne Simard as a young colleague of Gaétan
- Émilie Tancrède as "little Simard"
- Patrice Dussault as a lawyer
- Marc Simard Nataren as a waiter at the Continental
- Normand Carrière as Lionel
- Mireille Jodoin as a colleague
- Dominic Roch-Sickini as a colleague
- Claude-Maurice Lavoie as a colleague
- Daniel Barré as a man with the Boss
- Norbert Langlois as the real Coco
- Pier-Olivier Dumont as the real Puff
- Anjo Arson as a parishioner
- Rodney Kellman as the Sultan of Tehran
- Yves-Hubert Michaud as a maître d'
- Vincent Champoux as a waiter
- Jérémie Aubry as a waiter
- Miguel Fontaine as a valet
- Michel Lee as a doorman
- Charlotte Poitras as Coco's girlfriend
- Phoebe Major Mewse as Puff's girlfriend
- Louise-Véronique Sicotte as a parishioner
- André Latour as one of Bourassa's guards
- Claude Tremblay as "the Butcher"
- Nicolas Chabot as a man from the couple at the beach
- Esther Hardy as a woman from the couple at the beach
- Simon Rousseau as a Sûreté du Québec investigator
- Stéphanie M. Germain as a young sex worker
- Marc Larrivée as a man at the motel
- Alexandre St-Martin as one of the Cousineau brothers
- Marc-André Boire as one of the Cousineau brothers
- Michel Perron as Adélard
- Étienne De Passillé as a pizzeria cook
- Philippe Hartmann as a man in the motel parking lot
- Mara Tremblay as a cabaret singer
- Nicolas Landré as a radio journalist
- Jacques Monast as a Sûreté du Québec investigator
- Martin Lefebvre as a Sûreté du Québec investigator
- Yan Chamberland as a biker
- Bruce Wayne Le Gros as a biker
- Annie-Claude Letarte as Anita Gingras
- Joey Bélanger as one of Claude's children
- Alexia Martel as one of Claude's children
- David Nollet as Roger "Fries and Gravy" Perron
- Simon Lee Lepage as Luc "Grass Snake" Proulx
- Étienne Béliveau as Bob "Hammer" Cloutier
- Anouk Whissel as a biker
- Michel Parent as David "SS" Bouchard
- Loran Gagné as Martin "Demon" Gagné
- François Simard as a biker
- Yoann-Karl Whissel as a biker
- Alain Dahan as a taxi driver
- Benoît Gauthier as Gaston
- Marc-André Brisebois as Maurice
- John Sébastien Cote as Jean "the Bomb" Thivierge
- Lee Villeneuve as Camille "Old Bastard" Bellefeuille
- Marcello Bezina as Simon "Shotgun" Boisclair
- Stéphane Dargis as Alphonse "Fresh Pork" Desmarais

== Production ==
The series was directed by Jean-François Rivard, who was joined by Robin Aubert as co-director from the second season onward. It was produced by Productions Casablanca. The second season was filmed between June and October 2021, and began airing on March 3, 2022. The third and final season began airing on March 1, 2024.

The series has been described as a thematic spiritual successor and genre hybrid between creators François Létourneau and Jean-François Rivard's two previous series, Les Invincibles and Série Noire, "combining the horrors of married life with crime".

== Episodes ==
=== Series overview ===
Season	Episodes	Originally released		
Season	Episodes	First released	Last released	Network
1	10	March 6, 2020 (Note: The full ten episodes of the first season were released at the same time on the paid "Extra" tier of ICI TOU.TV on March 6, 2020. After streaming exclusively on "Extra" from March, the season aired weekly later that year on the free over-the-air ICI Radio-Canada Télé channel, starting on September 16 and concluding on November 18.)		ICI TOU.TV (Note: Each of the three seasons were originally released on the paid "Extra" tier of ICI TOU.TV, before a later weekly broadcast on the free over-the-air ICI Radio-Canada Télé channel.)
2	10	March 3, 2022	March 10, 2022 (Note: The ten episodes of the second season were released on the paid "Extra" tier of ICI TOU.TV in March 2022, with the first six episodes on March 3 and the latter four a week later on March 10. After streaming exclusively on "Extra" from March, the season aired weekly later that year on the free over-the-air ICI Radio-Canada Télé channel, starting on September 14 and concluding on November 16.)	ICI TOU.TV
3	8	March 1, 2024 (Note: The full eight episodes of the third and final season were released at the same time on the paid "Extra" tier of ICI TOU.TV on March 1, 2024. After streaming exclusively on "Extra" from March, the season aired weekly later that year on the free over-the-air ICI Radio-Canada Télé channel, starting on September 11 and concluding on October 30.)		ICI TOU.TV

=== Season 1 (2020) ===
No. overall	No. in season	French Title (per ICI TOU.TV)	English Title (per CBC Gem)	English Title (per MHz Choice)	Original air date
1	1	"Épisode pilote"	"Pilot Episode"	"Pilot"	March 6, 2020
2	2	"La saison de la chasse"	"Hunting Season"	"Hunting Season"	March 6, 2020
3	3	"Ma petite Japonaise"	"My Little Japanese"	"My Little Japanese Girl"	March 6, 2020
4	4	"Un tapis pour glisser"	"A Mat for Sliding"	"A Carpet to Slide On"	March 6, 2020
5	5	"Je mange comme le coucou"	"I Eat Like a Cuckoo"	"I Eat Like a Cockoo" [sic]	March 6, 2020
6	6	"Être prêt pour le bazar"	"Be Prepared for the Mess"	"Ready for the Bizarre"	March 6, 2020
7	7	"Le Motel La Demoiselle"	"The Motel La Demoiselle"	"The Demoiselle"	March 6, 2020
8	8	"La position de la flûte de jade"	"The Jade Flute Position"	"The Jade Flue Position" [sic]	March 6, 2020
9	9	"Solitude au sommet"	"Loneliness at the Top"	"Lonely at the Top"	March 6, 2020
10	10	"Embrasser les enfants"	"Kissing the Children"	"Hug the Kids"	March 6, 2020

=== Season 2 (2022) ===
No. overall	No. in season	French Title (per ICI TOU.TV)	English Title (per CBC Gem)	English Title (per MHz Choice)	Original air date
11	1	"Les fleurs de René"	"René's Flowers"	"Rene's Flowers"	March 3, 2022
12	2	"Une jument pour toi ma chérie"	"A Mare for You My Darling"	"A Mare for You, My Darling"	March 3, 2022
13	3	"La grande solitude de la femme au foyer"	"The Great Loneliness of the Housewife"	"The Loneliness of the Housewife"	March 3, 2022
14	4	"Le meurtrier ganté"	"The Gloved Murderer"	"The Gloved Killer"	March 3, 2022
15	5	"Le Gland d'Or"	"The Golden Acorn"	"The Golden Bellend"	March 3, 2022
16	6	"Trahison(s) et légumineuses"	"Betrayal(s) and Vegetables"	"Betrayal and Lentils"	March 3, 2022
17	7	"L'œil du diable"	"The Devil's Eye"	"The Eye of the Devil"	March 10, 2022
18	8	"L'exorcisme d'Huguette Delisle"	"The Exorcism of Huguette Delisle"	"The Exorcism of Huguette Delisle"	March 10, 2022
19	9	"La mante religieuse"	"The Praying Mantis"	"The Praying Mantis"	March 10, 2022
20	10	"La chute de Sainte-Foy"	"The Fall of Ste-Foy"	"The Fall of Sainte-Foy"	March 10, 2022

=== Season 3 (2024) ===
No. overall	No. in season	French Title (per ICI TOU.TV)	English Title (per CBC Gem) (Note: Season 3 was not licensed to MHz Choice, and no separate MHz English titles exist for these episodes; only the CBC Gem English titles are listed below.)	Original air date
21	1	"Le retour des Sexistes"	"The Return of the Sexists"	March 1, 2024
22	2	"Miss Sainte-Foy"	"Miss Sainte-Foy"	March 1, 2024
23	3	"Nadia, reine des Jeux"	"Nadia, Queen of the Games"	March 1, 2024
24	4	"Les nuits de Montréal"	"Montreal Nights"	March 1, 2024
25	5	"La rédemption de Gaétan Delisle"	"The Redemption of Gaétan Delisle"	March 1, 2024
26	6	"Trouver l'amour, tuer la mafia"	"Find Love, Kill the Mafia"	March 1, 2024
27	7	"La machine des secrets"	"The Machine of Secrets"	March 1, 2024
28	8	"Un dernier bain de minuit"	"One Last Skinny Dip"	March 1, 2024

== Broadcast and distribution ==
The series received a preview screening at the 70th Berlin International Film Festival, and all 10 episodes of the first season began streaming on the paid "Extra" tier of ICI TOU.TV on March 6, 2020, before being broadcast weekly on the free over-the-air ICI Radio-Canada Télé channel later that year, from September 16 to November 18.

A second season of ten episodes was announced in early 2021 and released in 2022, with the first six episodes debuting on TOU.TV "Extra" on March 3 and the latter four a week later on March 10, while the Radio-Canada Télé weekly broadcast aired from September 14 to November 16.

A third and final season of eight episodes released on TOU.TV on March 1, 2024, with a Radio-Canada Télé weekly broadcast following from September 11 to October 30, bringing the series' total run to 28 episodes across three seasons.

A version subtitled in English was made available on CBC Gem for English-Canadian audiences under the Happily Married title. The series was also picked up for distribution in France on the streaming service Salto, as one of its first international acquisitions; however, the service closed down in 2023. In the United States, the series is distributed by MHz Choice, but it only has the first two seasons since the third was never licensed to it.

== Awards ==
The series won 10 Prix Gémeaux in 2020, including the award for Best Dramatic Series, and later received a Prix Gémeaux for Best Editing in a Dramatic Work.

In 2021, the show won the Rogers Prize for Excellence in Canadian Content at the Banff World Media Festival.

At the 2023 Gala Les Olivier, the series won the award for Comedic Fiction Series of the Year for its second season.
