= Happily Married =

Happily Married may refer to:

- Happily Married (Bem casados), a 2015 Brazilian film directed by Aluizio Abranches
- Happily Married (TV series) (C'est comme ça que je t'aime), a 2020s Canadian television comedy series
