= Série noire (2014 TV series) =

- Release poster
- Genre: Black comedy; Comedy drama; Crime thriller; Neo-noir
- Created by: François Létourneau; Jean-François Rivard
- Written by: François Létourneau; Jean-François Rivard
- Directed by: Jean-François Rivard
- Starring: François Létourneau; Vincent-Guillaume Otis; Édith Cochrane; Marc Beaupré
- Narrated by: Bernard Derome
- Composer: Cristobal Tapia de Veer
- Country of origin: Canada
- Original languages: French; English
- No. of series: 2
- No. of episodes: 22

Production
- Executive producers: François Létourneau; Jean-François Rivard
- Producer: Joanne Forgues
- Production locations: Montreal, Quebec, Canada
- Cinematography: Martin Falardeau; Ronald Plante
- Editor: Yvann Thibaudeau
- Running time: 43 minutes
- Production company: Productions Casablanca

Original release
- Network: ICI Radio-Canada Télé; ICI TOU.TV
- Release: 13 January 2014 – 6 November 2015

Série Noire is a Canadian French-language black comedy crime thriller television series created by François Létourneau and Jean-François Rivard which was originally broadcast on ICI Radio-Canada Télé and ICI TOU.TV in 2014–2015, and ran for 22 episodes across 2 seasons. The series centers on Denis (Létourneau) and Patrick (Vincent-Guillaume Otis), the writers of a popular but critically reviled crime drama television show, "La loi de la justice" ("The Law of Justice"), as they embark on a real life crime spree following the end of their show's first season in the hope of accumulating the personal experience necessary to make the writing more realistic in its second season.

A Quebec production, every episode of the series was directed by Jean-François Rivard and written by François Létourneau and Rivard, and it starred Létourneau, Vincent-Guillaume Otis, Édith Cochrane, and Marc Beaupré, with narration provided by Bernard Derome, and music by Cristobal Tapia de Veer. The series was critically acclaimed and won eleven Prix Gémeaux awards in 2014 and four in 2016.

== Premise ==
Denis and Patrick, two screenwriters approaching their forties, find themselves unwillingly tasked with writing a second season of their crime drama television series "La loi de la justice" ("The Law of Justice") — a show which is critically panned but unexpectedly popular outside Montreal. Realizing how little talent and knowledge of the criminal justice world they actually have, the pair turn to a series of increasingly improbable methods, recreating the situations from their show in real life in order to make their characters more believable.

== Cast and characters ==
=== Starring ===
- François Létourneau as Denis Rondeau, screenwriter of "La loi de la justice" ("The Law of Justice")
- Vincent-Guillaume Otis as Patrick Bouchard, screenwriter of "La loi de la justice" and Denis's writing collaborator
- Édith Cochrane as Judith Larivée, Denis's wife and partner
- Marc Beaupré as Marc Arcand, a mentally unstable fan of "La loi de la justice" who approaches the two screenwriters due to sharing the same name as one of their show's characters
- Bernard Derome as the Narrator

=== Recurring and guest ===
- Anne-Élisabeth Bossé as Charlène (real name Julie Cantin), a sex worker
- Charlie Laplante as Juliette Rondeau, daughter of Denis and Judith
- Louise Bombardier as Louise Talbot, producer of "La loi de la justice"
- Jacques L'Heureux as Henri Talbot, Louise's husband and producer of "La loi de la justice"
- Alain Zouvi as the "Broadcaster", a network executive who broadcasts "La loi de la justice"
- Guy Nadon as Jean-Guy Boissonneau, an actor playing the "Judge Boivin" character on "La loi de la justice"
- Martin Drainville as Bruno / Yvan, a gynecologist and head of the "East Gay Gang (EGG)"
- Hugo Dubé as Claudio Brodeur / Angelo Desand, Bruno's partner and "EGG" member
- Martin-David Peters as Christian Perez, an investigator
- Élisabeth Locas as Caroline Michaud, an actress playing the "Valérie" character on "La loi de la justice"
- Sébastien René as Maître Marlin, a lawyer
- François Trudel as Ghyslain Perron, an actor playing the "Pierre" character on "La loi de la justice"
- Mathieu Dufresne as Grégory, a man whom Patrick looks into

==== Season 1 ====
- Caroline Bouchard as Léa, Patrick's girlfriend and a literature teacher and novelist whose book failed commercially
- Sharon Ibgui as Maude, a friend of Judith's
- Karen Elkin as Anne-Sophie Laverdière, a journalist
- Francine Ruel as Kimberly Bouchard, Patrick's mother
- Alexis Bélec as Ricky, Charlène's driver and "EGG" member
- Olivier Morin as Simon Bernier, an actor playing "Marc Arcand" on "La loi de la justice", a character which a fan of the show who shares the same name becomes attached to
- Nathalie Breuer as Laurence, the Broadcaster's wife
- Karen Racicot as Solange, Henri's mistress

==== Season 2 ====
- Billy Racine as "Douchebag", a nickname for Grégory's friend
- Pascale Desrochers as Linda, owner of the "Zoofolie" pet shop
- Léa-Marie Cantin as Huguette, caretaker of Glaçon, a small white dog
- Michel Laperrière as Minister Gaétan Thibodeau

== Production ==
=== Development ===
Following its production and release, the series was cancelled at the end of its first season, which had consisted of twelve episodes. However, under pressure from viewers—including a petition that gathered more than 13,000 signatures—Radio-Canada reversed its decision, and a second season was confirmed in July 2014. Filming took place over the winter and spring of 2015, notably in Alma and Montreal. The second season comprised ten episodes.

In an interview on the program La soirée est (encore) jeune on January 9, 2016, François Létourneau said that the two creators—himself and Jean-François Rivard—felt that, between the first two seasons, they had "told the story they wanted to tell", seemingly closing the door on a potential third season.

=== Casting ===
Even before the series was renewed for a second season, the producers announced that public auditions would be held to fill one of the show's roles.

=== Technical credits ===
- Creation: François Létourneau and Jean-François Rivard
- Direction: Jean-François Rivard
- Screenplay: François Létourneau and Jean-François Rivard
- Narrator: Bernard Derome
- Production design: Francis Tremblay
- Costumes: Anne-Karine Gauthier
- Cinematography: Martin Falardeau, Ronald Plante
- Sound: Patrick Lalonde, Michel Lecoufle, Olivier Rivard
- Editing: Yvann Thibaudeau
- Casting: Isabelle Thez-Axelrad, Brigitte Viau
- Music: Cristobal Tapia de Veer
- Producer: Johanne Forgues
- Production company: Productions Casablanca
- Distribution company: CBC/Radio-Canada Distribution
- Budget: $700,000 per episode

== Episodes ==
=== Series overview ===
Season	Episodes	Originally released		
Season	Episodes	First released	Last released	Network
1	12	January 13, 2014 (Note: The first season was originally broadcast weekly on the free over-the-air ICI Radio-Canada Télé channel from January 13 to March 31, 2014. The season was released later that year on the paid "Extra" tier of ICI TOU.TV, on September 15.)	March 31, 2014	ICI Radio-Canada Télé
2	10	November 6, 2015 (Note: The second season was originally released on the paid "Extra" tier of ICI TOU.TV on November 6, 2015. The season later aired weekly on the free over-the-air ICI Radio-Canada Télé channel, from January 15 to March 18, 2016.)		ICI TOU.TV

=== Season 1 (2014) ===
No. overall	No. in season	Title	Directed by	Written by	Original release date
1	1	"Episode 1"	Jean-François Rivard	François Létourneau & Jean-François Rivard	January 13, 2014 (ICI Radio-Canada Télé); September 15, 2014 (ICI TOU.TV)
Denis and Patrick are dismayed to learn their show has been renewed for a second season. A fateful encounter with an overzealous fan shakes Denis's convictions, though he isn't sure he can bring Patrick along with him. Patrick, meanwhile, is determined to patch things up with Léa, his neglected girlfriend.
2	2	"Episode 2"	Jean-François Rivard	François Létourneau & Jean-François Rivard	January 20, 2014 (ICI Radio-Canada Télé); September 15, 2014 (ICI TOU.TV)
Denis finally talks himself into his new approach, but family troubles get in the way. Barely recovered from a brief hospital stay, Patrick decides to act on a bold suggestion from Jean-Guy. Will he manage to pull Denis along into this next risky stage of their writing process?
3	3	"Episode 3"	Jean-François Rivard	François Létourneau & Jean-François Rivard	January 27, 2014 (ICI Radio-Canada Télé); September 15, 2014 (ICI TOU.TV)
Pleased with their bold move, Denis and Patrick head to the police station full of enthusiasm. The legal-crime world of La loi de la justice has never felt more within reach. Will they be inspired enough to put on a good show for the most powerful man in Quebec television? And will they feel compelled to push their method even further?
4	4	"Episode 4"	Jean-François Rivard	François Létourneau & Jean-François Rivard	February 3, 2014 (ICI Radio-Canada Télé); September 15, 2014 (ICI TOU.TV)
With Christmas fast approaching, Denis continues growing closer to the intense Marc Arcand. Patrick, now Charlène's driver, is a little startled by his rapid rise within Bruno's organization. At a party hosted by Louise, the two writers learn some unsettling news.
5	5	"Episode 5"	Jean-François Rivard	François Létourneau & Jean-François Rivard	February 10, 2014 (ICI Radio-Canada Télé); September 15, 2014 (ICI TOU.TV)
Determined to save their jobs, Denis and Patrick show up at their producer's office with the first two episodes of La loi de la justice's second season. Louise's reaction puts their partnership to the test. Marc Arcand, pursued by Bruno's men, takes refuge at Denis's place.
6	6	"Episode 6"	Jean-François Rivard	François Létourneau & Jean-François Rivard	February 17, 2014 (ICI Radio-Canada Télé); September 15, 2014 (ICI TOU.TV)
Hunted by Bruno's men, Denis and Patrick hole up in a motel. Between attempts to patch things up with his writing partner, Denis keeps up his writing sessions with Léa. Patrick tries to intimidate the network executive to get his job back. An unexpected visit from Ricky, Charlène's new driver, complicates matters further.
7	7	"Episode 7"	Jean-François Rivard	François Létourneau & Jean-François Rivard	February 25, 2014 (ICI Radio-Canada Télé); September 15, 2014 (ICI TOU.TV)
Completely overwhelmed by their latest discovery, Denis and Patrick get help from Judith, who is thrilled by the turn of events. Now under police protection, the two writers come up with a code system to communicate during their investigation. Judith inadvertently leads them to a new piece of evidence.
8	8	"Episode 8"	Jean-François Rivard	François Létourneau & Jean-François Rivard	March 3, 2014 (ICI Radio-Canada Télé); September 15, 2014 (ICI TOU.TV)
Shaken by their recent discoveries, Denis and Patrick try to learn more about the identity of a mysterious heavyset woman. Will Charlène and Judith help them get to the bottom of this new lead? After being kidnapped, Denis and Patrick discover, at great personal risk, the surprising motives behind Bruno's criminal organization.
9	9	"Episode 9"	Jean-François Rivard	François Létourneau & Jean-François Rivard	March 10, 2014 (ICI Radio-Canada Télé); September 15, 2014 (ICI TOU.TV)
As Caroline Michaud, who plays Valérie on La loi de la justice, threatens to quit the show, Denis and Patrick scramble to convince her to stay. A lawsuit brought by Maître Marlin and Marc Arcand catches the attention of journalist Anne-Sophie Laverdière. Can Denis and Patrick avoid a scandal?
10	10	"Episode 10"	Jean-François Rivard	François Létourneau & Jean-François Rivard	March 17, 2014 (ICI Radio-Canada Télé); September 15, 2014 (ICI TOU.TV)
Encouraged by the positive response to the show's first three episodes, Patrick and Denis plan to make the most of their stay at Louise's chalet to write and to raid her well-stocked wine cellar. But strange noises, children's screams, and a raging storm quickly turn a picturesque writing retreat into the climax of a horror film. Alerted to her daughter's disappearance, will Judith call the authorities?
11	11	"Episode 11"	Jean-François Rivard	François Létourneau & Jean-François Rivard	March 24, 2014 (ICI Radio-Canada Télé); September 15, 2014 (ICI TOU.TV)
Euphoric at having survived his confrontation with Claudio, Patrick celebrates with Charlène. Denis, troubled by his recent discovery, tries to rein in his friend's excitement by sharing his suspicions. Patrick, in turn, looks to confirm his doubts by digging deeper into the investigation.
12	12	"Episode 12"	Jean-François Rivard	François Létourneau & Jean-François Rivard	March 31, 2014 (ICI Radio-Canada Télé); September 15, 2014 (ICI TOU.TV)
At each other's throats, Denis and Patrick try to keep writing their series. But events spiral and revelations pile up. By the end of their wild investigation, the two writers discover that real life is far stranger and more unbelievable than even the most implausible fiction.

=== Season 2 (2015) ===
No. overall	No. in season	Title	Directed by	Written by	Original release date
13	1	"Episode 1"	Jean-François Rivard	François Létourneau & Jean-François Rivard	November 6, 2015 (ICI TOU.TV); January 15, 2016 (ICI Radio-Canada Télé)
Still reeling from Charlène's betrayal, and with Denis trying to forget Judith, the two writers survive a terrible bombing. Are they being targeted in retaliation by the East Gay Gang, whose leader, Claudio Brodeur, has just been arrested? Who is the gravel-voiced woman who saved their lives? With Investigator Perez's help, Denis and Patrick have no choice but to flee the city for their own protection — though the getaway won't bring the peace they hoped for.
14	2	"Episode 2"	Jean-François Rivard	François Létourneau & Jean-François Rivard	November 6, 2015 (ICI TOU.TV) January 22, 2016 (ICI Radio-Canada Télé)
Back in the city, Denis and Patrick, stalked by a mysterious man in a bicycle helmet, take refuge in the apartment once meant as a love nest for Patrick and Charlène. Hoping to learn the identity of the woman who saved them from the bombing, they head to Minister Thibodeau's constituency office and try to infiltrate his campaign. They end up tasked with organizing a spaghetti dinner that proves as chaotic as it is revealing.
15	3	"Episode 3"	Jean-François Rivard	François Létourneau & Jean-François Rivard	November 6, 2015 (ICI TOU.TV) January 29, 2016 (ICI Radio-Canada Télé)
Claudio's release from prison complicates matters for Denis and Patrick. Will they agree to don EGG colours to help the hapless fugitive smooth things over with the "top bosses"? And will they manage to learn more about the mysterious Yvan? Simon Bernier, exhausted from his preparation for La loi de la justice, tries to break free of Marc Arcand's influence, inviting Denis and Patrick to a party where they helplessly witness his dramatic breakdown.
16	4	"Episode 4"	Jean-François Rivard	François Létourneau & Jean-François Rivard	November 6, 2015 (ICI TOU.TV) February 5, 2016 (ICI Radio-Canada Télé)
As Patrick looks into Grégory and Denis investigates why Investigator Perez has been visiting Judith, a call from a source nicknamed "Deepthroat" reignites hope of finally untangling the strange conspiracy hanging over them. A meeting with the informant puts Patrick's life in serious danger. Desperate, Denis tries to help his friend with the help of Maître Marlin and Charlène. By the end of a wild night, Denis and Patrick learn that appearances are always deceiving, and that the real threat is never where you expect it.
17	5	"Episode 5"	Jean-François Rivard	François Létourneau & Jean-François Rivard	November 6, 2015 (ICI TOU.TV) February 12, 2016 (ICI Radio-Canada Télé)
Determined to question Louise, Denis and Patrick try to reach her without success. Convinced their producer is hiding something, they investigate her disappearance and quickly uncover deeply incriminating material. Marc Arcand, after a retreat into the cold and snow, chooses to make peace with Simon Bernier and his own past. The filming of a summer promo reuniting the whole cast of La loi de la justice brings Denis and Patrick closer to the truth. But for that truth to come out, someone will have to pay with their life.
18	6	"Episode 6"	Jean-François Rivard	François Létourneau & Jean-François Rivard	November 6, 2015 (ICI TOU.TV) February 19, 2016 (ICI Radio-Canada Télé)
After a gruelling funeral, Denis and Patrick, unwilling to drop their investigation, try to learn more about Louise and Henri's financial troubles. Patrick manages to arrange a meeting with Charlène to get to the bottom of her unsettling alliance with Minister Thibodeau. Denis, touched by an invitation to spend the night at Judith's, allows himself to hope he might win his family back. A visit to the cemetery turns up new clues, while Claudio's threats against poor Judith intensify. Caught up against their will in a criminal act, can Denis and Patrick get out of it this time?
19	7	"Episode 7"	Jean-François Rivard	François Létourneau & Jean-François Rivard	November 6, 2015 (ICI TOU.TV) February 26, 2016 (ICI Radio-Canada Télé)
Discovering the nature of a deadly poison sends Denis and Patrick back to the strange pet shop. Will Linda offer any answers? The visit gives Denis a chance for an act of bravery that wins him the admiration of one of the shop's regular customers. After a surprise appearance by Henri and a startling confession, the two writers learn a great deal about their producers' ties to the pet shop. A visit to the notary muddies the waters even further on Henri's part. Marc Arcand, convinced he will play the character named after himself, meets the lovely Caroline Michaud — how will he react when he learns of the romantic invitation she's extended to Denis?
20	8	"Episode 8"	Jean-François Rivard	François Létourneau & Jean-François Rivard	November 6, 2015 (ICI TOU.TV) March 4, 2016 (ICI Radio-Canada Télé)
Trapped at a dinner gone wrong, Denis can count on Marc Arcand's help to get him out of trouble. The discovery of a strange pager adds an important new piece to the investigation. Patrick, with Jean-Guy's help, tries to sabotage Charlène's involvement in Minister Thibodeau's election campaign. As the two writers uncover an entire network of shady characters, Investigator Perez throws obstacles in their way. Have they finally pushed their investigation too far this time?
21	9	"Episode 9"	Jean-François Rivard	François Létourneau & Jean-François Rivard	November 6, 2015 (ICI TOU.TV) March 11, 2016 (ICI Radio-Canada Télé)
After a rough interrogation by Investigator Perez, Denis, now free again, reunites with Patrick. Together they go looking for the Super Aqua Fun water park, suspected of links to the shady figures who have threatened their lives. There they make some terrible discoveries and face numerous dangers. On the run once more, they are intercepted by the network executive, who sheds further light on the mystery. Patrick learns more about Charlène's murky motives, while Denis fears the worst for the safety of Judith and Juliette.
22	10	"Episode 10"	Jean-François Rivard	François Létourneau & Jean-François Rivard	November 6, 2015 (ICI TOU.TV) March 18, 2016 (ICI Radio-Canada Télé)
Convinced of his rival's guilt, Denis tries unsuccessfully to find allies within the police force. Will he manage to convince Judith that his wild theories hold up? As Charlène confronts Minister Thibodeau and reveals her true motives, Patrick tries to help her. But the two writers' plans are upended by Marc Arcand, who finds in reality the redemption he once thought he could only find in fiction. After an investigation that has spanned an entire winter, Denis and Patrick discover, at great personal risk, that tragic endings aren't only found on television.

== Release ==
The first season of twelve episodes originally aired on the free over-the-air ICI Radio-Canada Télé channel in Q1 of 2014, from January 13 to March 31, and later that year it was made available online on the paid "Extra" tier of ICI TOU.TV, on September 15.

The second and ultimately final season, which consisted of ten episodes, was released on ICI TOU.TV "Extra" on November 6, 2015, and later aired weekly on ICI Radio-Canada Télé during Q1 of 2016, from January 15 until March 18.

Since June 2018, the complete series has been available on Netflix, viewable only in its original French version, with the option of English subtitles. Both seasons are also available online on ICI TOU.TV "Extra", and on Netflix in Canada.

=== Aftershow ===
Série Noire: L'obsession is a French-Canadian digital aftershow and companion web series created to accompany Série Noire. Hosted by media personality Sébastien Diaz, the web series aired on ICI Radio-Canada Télé immediately following the TV broadcasts. It featured the host, the show's creators (François Létourneau and Jean-François Rivard), and celebrity guests breaking down the episodes' most shocking, hilarious, and bizarre moments.

== Music used in the series ==
The series features a number of needle drops—pre-existing songs used as part of the soundtrack—in addition to the original soundtrack (OST) score, which is composed by Cristobal Tapia de Veer.

Season 1:

- "Do You Love Me Now" by Kim Deal and Kelley Deal
- "Destroy Everything You Touch" by Ladytron
- "Loaded Gun" by Lightning Dust
- "Kill Me" by Make the Girl Dance
- "C'est moi" by Marie-Mai
- "Way to Blue" by Nick Drake
- "This Is Not a Love Song" by Public Image Limited
- "All the Things She Said" by t.A.T.u.
- "Little Drummer Boy" by The Dandy Warhols
- "April Skies" by The Jesus and Mary Chain
- "Illusion" by VNV Nation

Season 2:

- "House of the Rising Sun" by Demis Roussos
- "Le Chat du café des artistes" by Jean-Pierre Ferland
- "Do You Love Me Now" by Kim Deal and Kelley Deal
- "Rock Me All Over" by Lee Aaron
- "The Night Before" by Lee Hazlewood
- "Come On Over (Turn Me On)" by Mark Lanegan & Isobel Campbell
- "Je voudrais voir la mer" by Michel Rivard
- "People Who Died" by The Jim Carroll Band

== Awards ==
The first season won eleven Prix Gémeaux awards in 2014, including Best Direction for a Dramatic Series (Jean-François Rivard), Best Writing for a Dramatic Series (François Létourneau and Rivard), Best Lead Actor in a Dramatic Series (Létourneau), Best Supporting Actor and Best Supporting Actress in a Dramatic Series (Guy Nadon and Louise Bombardier, respectively), Best Original Music and Best Theme Music (Cristobal Tapia de Veer), Best Sound (Patrick Lalonde, Michel Lecoufle, and Olivier Rivard), Best Editing (Yvann Thibaudeau), Best Production Design (Francis Tremblay), and Best Digital Production (a website and mobile app related to the series). The second season won a further four Prix Gémeaux awards in 2016, including Best Cinematography (Martin Falardeau), Best Casting (Isabelle Thez-Axelrad and Brigitte Viau), Best Original Music (Tapia de Veer), and Best Production Design (Tremblay).

=== Wins ===
Prix Gémeaux 2014

- Best Direction: Dramatic Series (Jean-François Rivard)
- Best Writing: Dramatic Series (François Létourneau, Jean-François Rivard)
- Best Editing: Fiction (Yvann Thibaudeau)
- Best Sound: Fiction (Patrick Lalonde, Michel Lecoufle, Olivier Rivard)
- Best Production Design: Fiction (Francis Tremblay)
- Best Original Music: Fiction (Cristobal Tapia de Veer)
- Best Theme Music: All categories (Cristobal Tapia de Veer)
- Best Lead Actor: Drama (François Létourneau)
- Best Supporting Actor: Drama (Guy Nadon)
- Best Supporting Actress: Drama (Louise Bombardier)
- Best Digital Production (website and/or mobile app) for a program or series: Fiction (the website and app)

Prix Gémeaux 2016

- Best Cinematography: Fiction (Martin Falardeau)
- Best Production Design: Fiction (Francis Tremblay)
- Best Casting: Fiction (Isabelle Thez-Axelrad, Brigitte Viau)
- Best Original Music: Fiction (Cristobal Tapia de Veer)

=== Nominations ===
Prix Gémeaux 2014

- Best Dramatic Series
- Best Hair/Makeup: All categories (Djina Caron, Christel Piazzolla)
- Best Lead Actress: Drama (Anne-Élisabeth Bossé)
- Best Supporting Actor: Drama (Marc Beaupré)
- Best Supporting Actor: Drama (Hugo Dubé)

Prix Gémeaux 2016

- Best Dramatic Series
- Best Writing: Dramatic Series (François Létourneau, Jean-François Rivard)
- Best Lead Actor: Drama (François Létourneau)
- Best Lead Actor: Drama (Vincent-Guillaume Otis)
- Best Costume Design: All categories (Anne-Karine Gauthier)
- Best Lead Actress: Drama (Anne-Élisabeth Bossé)
- Best Supporting Actor: Drama (Guy Nadon)
- Best Digital Production for a Fiction Series (Série Noire: L'obsession, hosted by Sébastien Diaz)
