= Cristobal Tapia de Veer =

Chilean and Canadian composer

Cristóbal Tapia de Veer
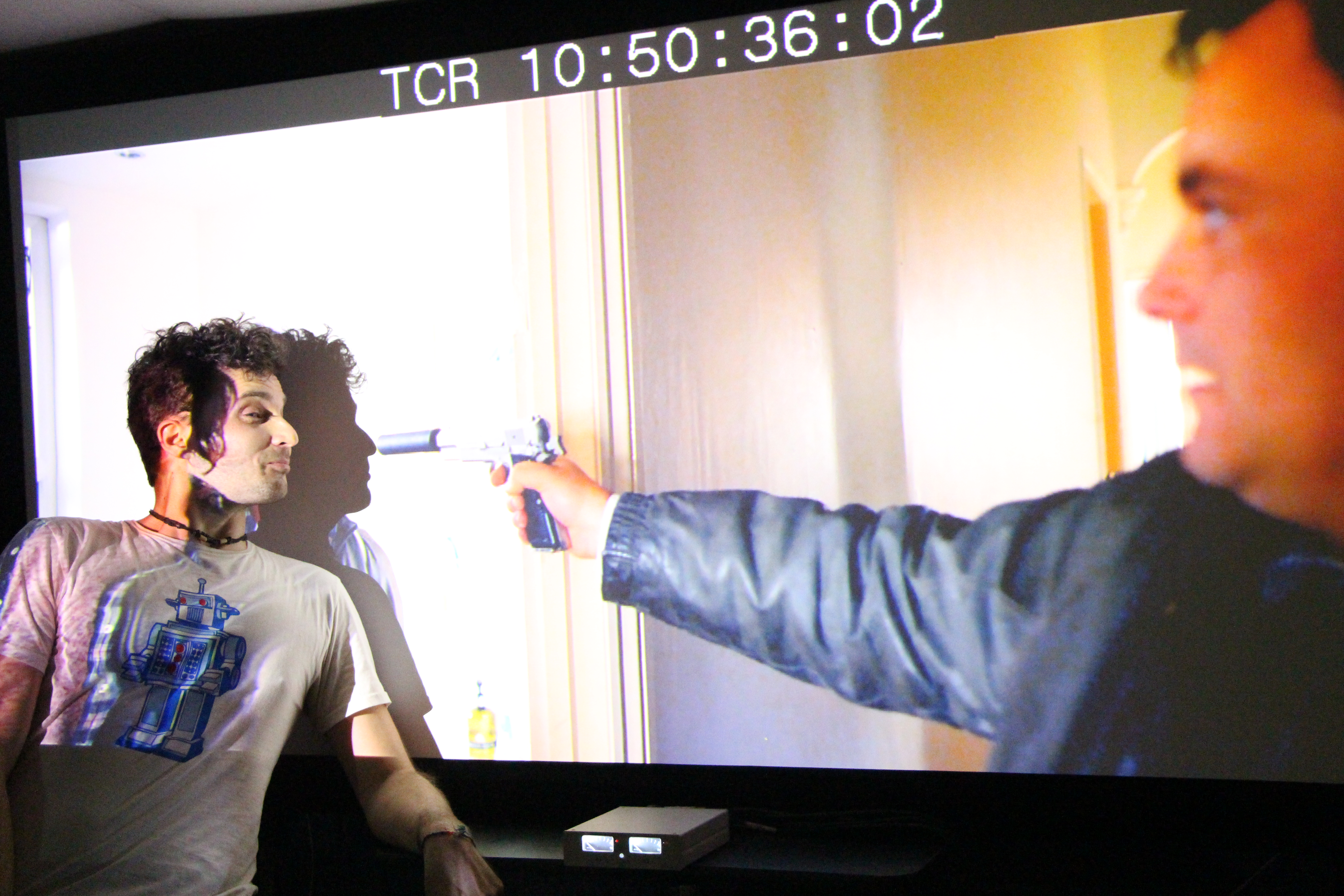
- Tapia de Veer during post-production for Utopia

Background information
- Born: Juan Cristóbal Tapia de Veer; October 18, 1973 (age 53); Santiago, Chile
- Genres: Electronica; classical; pop
- Occupations: Score composer; record producer
- Labels: Lakeshore Records; Silva Screen Records; Death Waltz, Mondo; La La Land Records
- Website: freerunartists.com

Juan Cristóbal Tapia de Veer (born October 18, 1973) is a Chilean and Canadian film and television score composer, arranger, producer and multi-instrumentalist based in Montreal, Quebec, Canada. He is best known for his work on the American TV series The White Lotus, for which he won several Primetime Emmy Awards. He is also known for scoring British TV series Utopia, for which he won a Royal Television Society award in the best original score category in 2013, the Quebec series Série Noire, for which he won Prix Gémeaux awards in 2014 and 2016, and the UK Channel 4's National Treasure, which earned him a BAFTA in 2017. He won best original score at the Festival international du film fantastique de Gérardmer for the 2016 film The Girl with All the Gifts. He has received awards from the Society of Composers, Authors and Music Publishers of Canada in 2013 and 2017.

== Early life ==
Tapia de Veer was born on October 18, 1973, a few weeks after the military coup in Chile. His parents initially fled to Paris, France. After the coup, his father remained in France, while his mother returned to Chile with him. Life under Pinochet's dictatorship proved difficult, and eventually they became political refugees in Quebec, Canada.

== Career ==
Tapia de Veer earned a master's degree in classical music (specializing in percussion) from the Conservatoire de musique du Québec. In 2001 he signed to Warner Music with his pop band One Ton, putting a hold on his classical career. The trio won the Canadian Dance Music Award (SOCAN) in 2003 with the electro-dance single "Supersex World". Tapia de Veer produced the album.

In 2011, his music for the Victorian four-part drama The Crimson Petal and the White (directed by Marc Munden, BBC2) was well received by critics. Matthew Gilbert of The Boston Globe, said: "The soundtrack ranges from gnawing electronic hums to choral ecstasy. It's all brilliantly, effectively, appropriately jarring".

He went on to compose the music for the Channel 4 conspiracy thriller Utopia (created by Dennis Kelly) for which he won a Royal Television Society Craft & Design Award for "best original music" in November 2013. The judges stated his "work blurred the lines between sound design and score, creating a soundtrack that the jury said felt like it was being played inside your head". Up again for an RTS Award in 2014, the music for the second series won the Music & Sound Award in 2015 in the Best Original TV Score category. His work on Utopia was nominated for Televisual Magazine's Bulldog Award for best music and subsequently released on yellow and green vinyl.

In early 2014, Tapia de Veer completed the music for the TV-show Série noire, which aired on ICI-Radio-Canada Télé. The Academy of Canadian Cinema and Television awarded him two Prix Gémeaux for best Original Music and Best Musical Theme the same year and again in 2016 for the second season.

He also finished the works on BBC's Jamaica Inn, directed by Phillipa Lowthorpe. Tapia de Veer then wrote the music for the first season of AMC's / Channel 4's co-production Humans.

In 2016, he scored his first feature film, The Girl with All the Gifts, which opened the Locarno Film Festival. His music won in the Best Original Music category at the Festival international du film fantastique de Gérardmer, France, in 2017. Paramount Pictures used his opening theme, GIFTED, for the final trailer of the 2019 remake of Pet Sematary and Focus Home Interactive for their videogame Call of Cthulhu.

Tapia de Veer was unable to score the following season of Humans, because he teamed up with Marc Munden again, to work on National Treasure, Channel 4's four-part drama inspired by Operation Yewtree, the police investigation into the sexual abuse perpetrated by Jimmy Savile and allegations against other media personalities. The series won a BAFTA and a FIPA D'OR at the Festival International de Programmes Audiovisuels in Biarritz, France, for Tapia de Veer's original score.

BBC America's series Dirk Gently's Holistic Detective Agency found a dedicated fanbase in 2016, which is still waiting for a soundtrack album to be released. Due to Tapia de Veer's heavily charged schedule, he was not able to work on the second season.

In the same year Amazon Prime hired Tapia de Veer to work on two episodes of the anthology series Philip K. Dick's Electric Dreams. He worked on HUMAN IS, starring Bryan Cranston as well as CRAZY DIAMOND, starring Steve Buscemi, for which he got a nomination for a Primetime Emmy Award the following year.

He also scored the Season 4 episode of Netflix's series Black Mirror, entitled "Black Museum".

SOCAN awarded him its International Achievement Award in fall 2017, the first time that a composer for film and television had received the prize.

In 2018, the Canneseries festival invited Tapia de Veer to be part of the jury for its first season, alongside Michael Kenneth Williams, German actress Paula Beer, Turkish actress Melisa Sozen, French screenwriter and director Audrey Fouché, and Harlan Coben.

He then scored his second feature film, Advantages of Travelling by Train, a 2019 adaptation of Antonio Orejudo's novel of the same name, directed by Aritz Moreno and produced by Morena Films in Spain, starring Luis Tosar, Pilar Castro, and Javier Botet. The film competed in major film festivals such as Sitges, Tokyo, and Brussels Film Festival (BRFF), and was awarded "Best Comedy" at the Goya Awards in 2020. Tapia de Veer's music for the film earned him a nomination at Spain's Premios Feroz.

Releases in 2020 include the series Hunters for Amazon Prime and the drama The Third Day for HBO/ SKY.

In 2021, he scored the HBO limited series The White Lotus, for which he won two Primetime Emmy Awards (one for the main title music, the other for his work scoring the series) and a Society of Composers & Lyricists Award. He also received his second BAFTA nomination for his music for The Third Day.

The following year, he scored the supernatural horror film Smile, directed by Parker Finn. He scored the second season of The White Lotus in collaboration with Kim Neundorf, for which he won another Emmy award. He again returned for the third season of The White Lotus but then announced he would not be returning for further seasons due to creative differences with series creator Mike White. Tapia de Veer won an Emmy for his work on the third season's score.

== Discography ==
=== Soundtrack releases ===
- Utopia (Silva Screen Records, 2013)
- Utopia: Season 2 (Silva Screen Records, 2014)
- Humans (Silva Screen Records, 2015)
- National Treasure (Free Run Artists, 2017)
- The Girl with all the Gifts (Mondo, Death Waltz Records, 2017)
- Black Mirror: Black Museum (Lakeshore Records, 2018)
- Philip K. Dick's: Electric Dreams (La La Land Records / 2018)
- The Third Day: Summer (Milan Records / Sony Music, 2020)
- Hunters: Season 1 (2020)
- The White Lotus (WaterTower Music, 2021)
- Smile (Paramount Music, 2022)
- The White Lotus: Season 2 (WaterTower Music, 2022) (with Kim Neundorf)
- Smile 2 (Paramount Music, Lakeshore Records, 2024)
- Babygirl (A24 Music, 2024)

=== Feature films ===
Year	Title	Director(s)	Notes
2016	The Girl with All the Gifts	Colm McCarthy	
2019	Advantages of Travelling by Train	Aritz Moreno	
2022	Smile	Parker Finn	
2024	Smile 2	Parker Finn	
2024	Babygirl	Halina Reijn	
2024	Ponyboi	Esteban Arango	
2025	& Sons	Pablo Trapero	
2026	The Stunt Driver	Michael Dowse	
TBA	Psyche	Agustina San Martin	Post-production

=== Short films ===
Year	Title	Director(s)	Notes
2014	Eladio y la Puerta Interdimensional	María Giráldez and Miguel Provencio	Official English title: Eladio at the Interdimensional Gate
2017	Cla'am	Nathaniel Martello-White	
2025	The Tiger	Spike Jonze and Halina Reijn	

=== Documentaries ===
Year	Title	Director(s)	Notes
2008	Mirages d'un Eldorado	Martin Frigon	Official English title: Mirage of El Dorado
2025	Assembly	Rashaad Newsome and Johnny Symons	
2026	Nuisance Bear	Gabriela Osio Vanden and Jack Weisman	

=== Television series ===
Year	Title	Notes
2011	The Crimson Petal and the White	Miniseries
2013–2014	Utopia	
2014–2016	Série Noire	
2014	Jamaica Inn	Miniseries
2015	Humans	Series 1
2016	National Treasure	Miniseries
2016	Dirk Gently's Holistic Detective Agency	Season 1
2017	Philip K. Dick's Electric Dreams	Episodes: "Crazy Diamond" and "Human Is"
2017	Black Mirror	Episode: "Black Museum"
2020	Hunters	Season 1
2020	The Third Day	Part 1: "Summer"
2021–2025	The White Lotus	Seasons 1–3 Season 2 with Kim Neundorf Season 3 with Peranya Visitchantaragoon
2026	Lord of the Flies	Miniseries

=== Other ===
Year	Title	Notes
2023	Willy's Wonderland Comic Series Fan Dub	Episode 3 Motion comic based on a comic book series, serving as a prequel to the film Willy's Wonderland

== Awards and nominations ==
Year	Award	Category	Nominee(s)	Result	Ref.
2013	Royal Television Society Craft & Design Awards	Best Original Music	Utopia (Season 1)	Won	
2014	Prix Gémeaux	Best Original Score	Série noire (Season 1)	Won	
2014	Prix Gémeaux	Best Theme / Theme Music	Série noire (Season 1)	Won	
2016	Prix Gémeaux	Best Original Score	Série noire (Season 2)	Won	
2017	British Academy Television Craft Awards	Best Original Music	National Treasure	Won	
2017	Golden FIPA (Festival International de Programmes Audiovisuels)	Best Original Music	National Treasure	Won	
2017	Festival international du film fantastique de Gérardmer	Best Original Score	The Girl with All the Gifts	Won	
2017	SOCAN Awards	International Achievement Award	Cristóbal Tapia de Veer	Won	
2022	Imagen Awards	Best Music Composition for Film or Television	The White Lotus (Season 1)	Nominated	
2022	Primetime Creative Arts Emmy Awards	Outstanding Music Composition for a Limited or Anthology Series, Movie or Special (Original Dramatic Score)	The White Lotus (Season 1) – “Mysterious Monkeys”	Won	
2022	Primetime Creative Arts Emmy Awards	Outstanding Original Main Title Theme Music	The White Lotus (Season 1)	Won	
2022	ASCAP Screen Music Awards	Television Theme of the Year	The White Lotus (Season 1)	Won	
2022	ASCAP Screen Music Awards	Television Score of the Year	The White Lotus (Season 1)	Won	
2022	Society of Composers & Lyricists Awards	Outstanding Original Score for a Television Production	Cristóbal Tapia de Veer	Won	
2023	Society of Composers & Lyricists Awards	Outstanding Score for Television	Cristóbal Tapia de Veer	Won	
2023	Primetime Creative Arts Emmy Awards	Outstanding Music Composition for a Series (Original Dramatic Score)	The White Lotus (Season 2) – “In the Sandbox”	Won	
2023	ASCAP Screen Music Awards	Television Theme of the Year	The White Lotus (Season 2)	Won	
2023	ASCAP Screen Music Awards	Television Score of the Year	The White Lotus (Season 2)	Won	
2025	Primetime Creative Arts Emmy Awards	Outstanding Original Main Title Theme Music	The White Lotus (Season 3)	Won	
2025	Primetime Creative Arts Emmy Awards	Outstanding Music Composition for a Series (Original Dramatic Score)	The White Lotus (Season 3) – “Amor Fati”	Nominated	
