= Naomi Scott =

English actress and singer (born 1993)

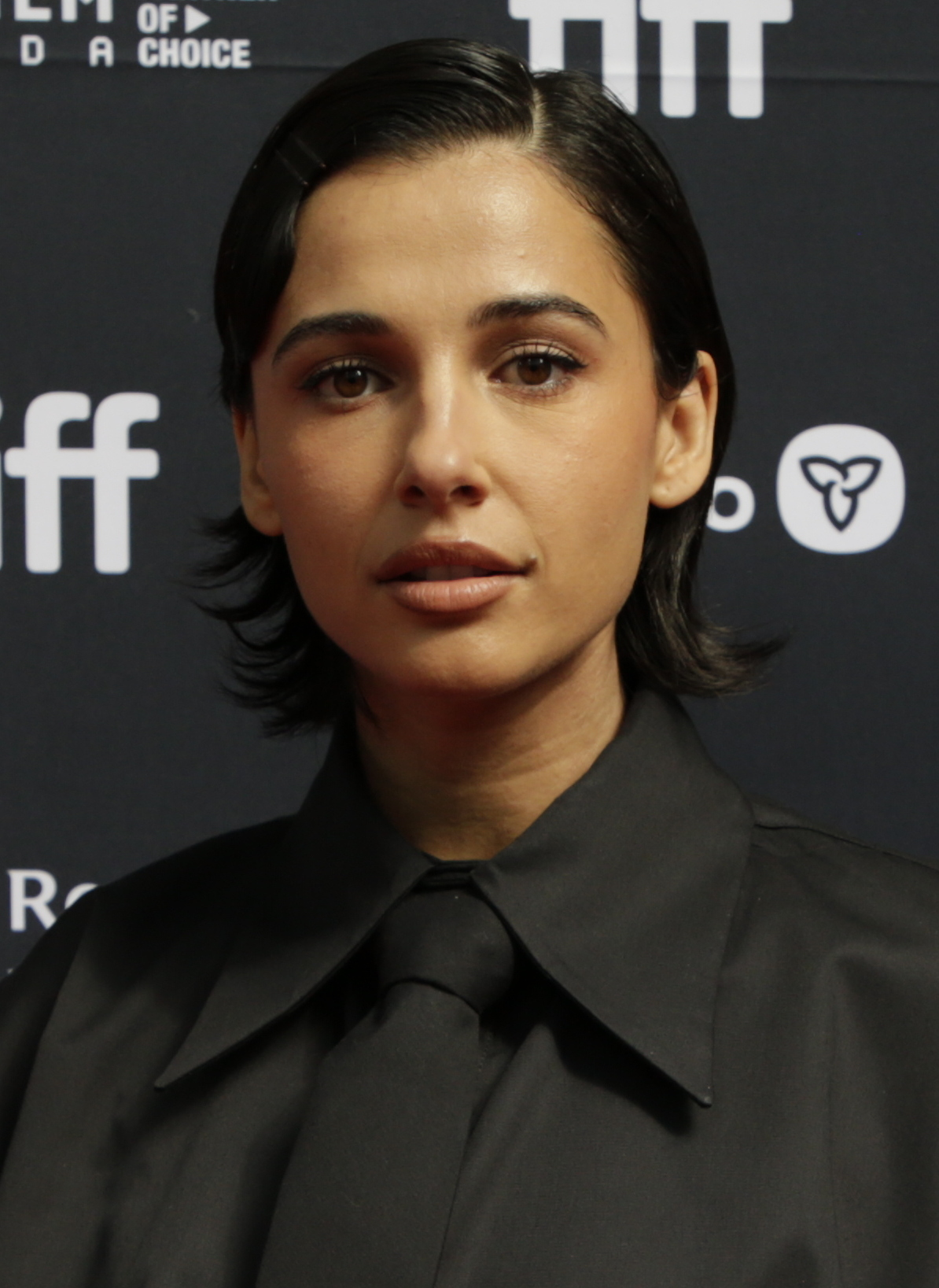
- Scott at the 2025 Toronto International Film Festival
- Born: Naomi Grace Scott; 6 May 1993 (age 33); Hounslow, London, England
- Occupations: Actress; singer
- Years active: 2008–present
- Spouse: Jordan Spence (m. 2014)
- Awards: Full list

Naomi Grace Scott (born 6 May 1993) is an English actress and singer. She received recognition for starring in the musical television film Lemonade Mouth (2011) and performing on its eponymous soundtrack. She also starred in the science fiction series Terra Nova (2011) and the superhero film Power Rangers (2017).

Scott gained wide attention in 2019 for leading the action comedy film Charlie's Angels and portraying Jasmine in the fantasy film Aladdin. After a brief hiatus from acting, she starred in the Netflix miniseries Anatomy of a Scandal (2022) and the horror film Smile 2 (2024).

Scott began her music career contributing to the soundtrack of Lemonade Mouth in 2011, it contained the song "She's So Gone" which later went on to be certified platinum in the US, and "Breakthrough" which entered the Billboard Hot 100 charts. She released two extended plays (EPs), Invisible Division in 2014 and Promises in 2016. Her song "Speechless" from the Aladdin soundtrack became her first song to be certified platinum in the US and was commercially successful. In 2024, she portrayed the fictional popstar Skye Riley in Smile 2 and released The Skye Riley EP. Her critically-acclaimed debut studio album, F.I.G, was released in 2026.

== Early life ==
Naomi Scott was born on 6 May 1993 in Hounslow, London, to a British father Christopher Scott and an Indian origin British mother Usha (née Joshi); they married in 1984. Her mother was born in Uganda to Indian-Gujarati parents and emigrated to the United Kingdom at a young age due to expulsion of South Asians from Uganda by then Ugandan dictator Idi Amin. Scott also has an older brother Joshua David born in 1991.

At eight years old, she and her family moved to Woodford, London, where both of her parents were pastors at the Bridge Church. She grew up listening to gospel and R&B music, specific singers Kim Burrell, Mary Mary, and Kirk Franklin, and singing in church.

Scott attended Davenant Foundation School in Loughton, Essex. She left school halfway through taking her A-Levels to pursue acting.

== Career ==
=== Early work and recognition (2008–2018) ===
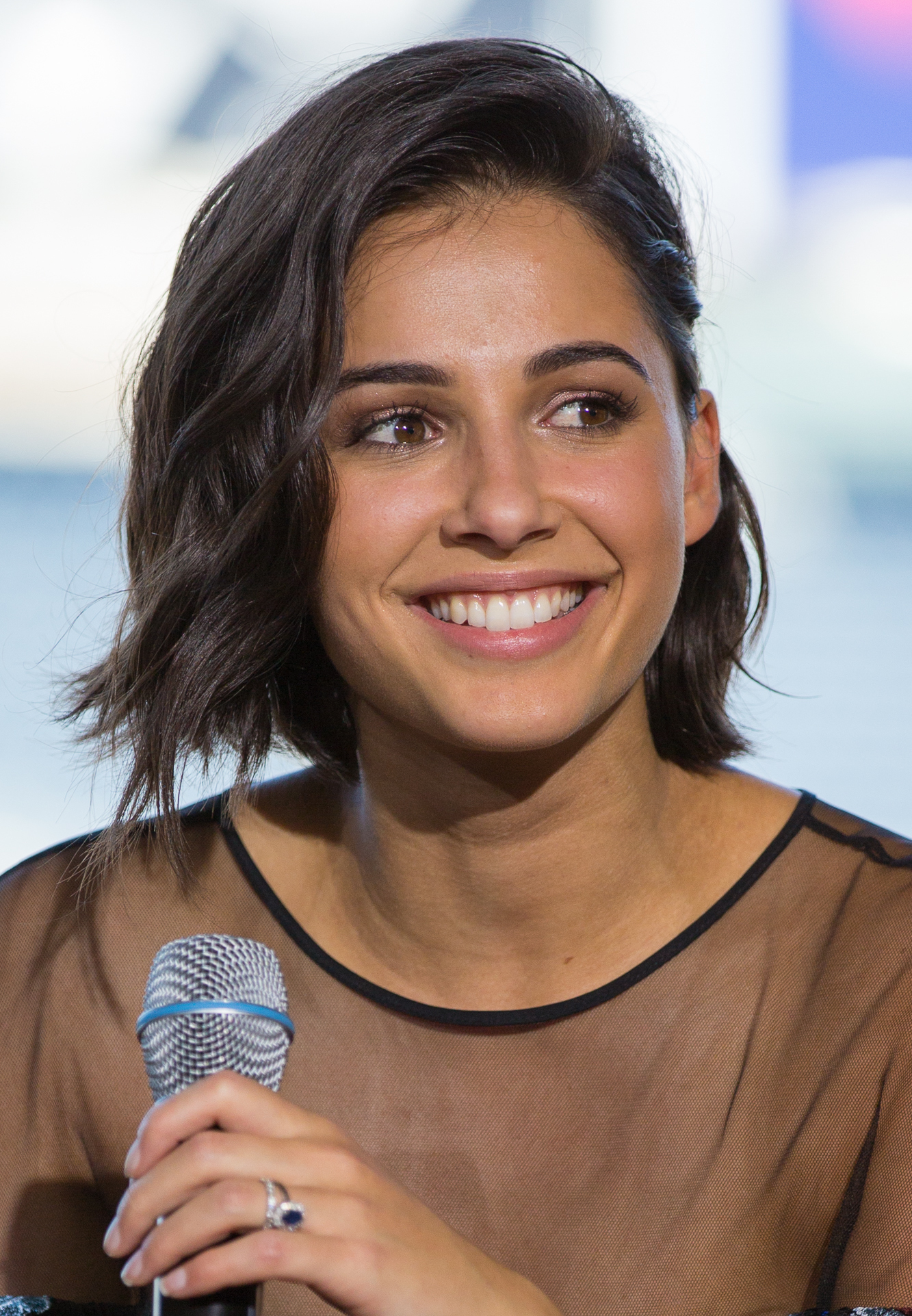
Scott at the 2016 San Diego Comic-Con

Scott was discovered by British pop singer Kéllé Bryan from the girl group Eternal, who signed her as a client. She went to work with British songwriters and producers Xenomania. Her first major acting role was Disney Channel UK series Life Bites.

In 2010, she was cast as Mohini "Mo" Banjaree in the acclaimed 2011 Disney Channel original film Lemonade Mouth, her first role in an American production. She told Collider that "I [also] remember being introduced to craft services for the first time. And for me, it's this US production and I was like, oh my gosh, they have a trolley of candy that just came around! And to me I just thought, I've made it. This is what I've wanted. This is what it's all about. It's all about candy on a trolley." Khalid McCalla of The Oberlin Review believed that Scott "absolutely crushes it." She additionally contributed vocals to the film's commercially successful soundtrack. The song "She's So Gone" featured Scott on lead vocals; it was included on Billboard's list of "The 100 Greatest Disney Songs of All Time". That same year she was cast as Maddy Shannon in the science fiction series Terra Nova, which premiered in September 2011 on Fox. The series was not renewed for a second season.

In 2013, Scott appeared in the music video for the song "Hurricane", by her Lemonade Mouth co-star Bridgit Mendler. In August 2014, she independently released her debut EP Invisible Division. Scott was cast as Ryoko in Ridley Scott's The Martian. She filmed her scenes but most of them (including every scene where Scott speaks) were removed from the final cut, effectively making her an "extra" in the film. In 2014, the YouTube channel "Reload" published two videos featuring her, as part of their "Reload Sessions" series.

Screen International selected Scott as one of their 2015 Stars of Tomorrow. In October, she was cast in a co-leading role as Kimberly Hart, the Pink Ranger, in Power Rangers (2017), a film adaptation of the TV series of the same name. The film was released on 24 March 2017, and earned Scott a Teen Choice Award nomination. The film was met with mixed reviews upon release and was a box office disappointment, grossing $142 million worldwide against a budget of $105 million.

=== Mainstream breakthrough (2019–present) ===
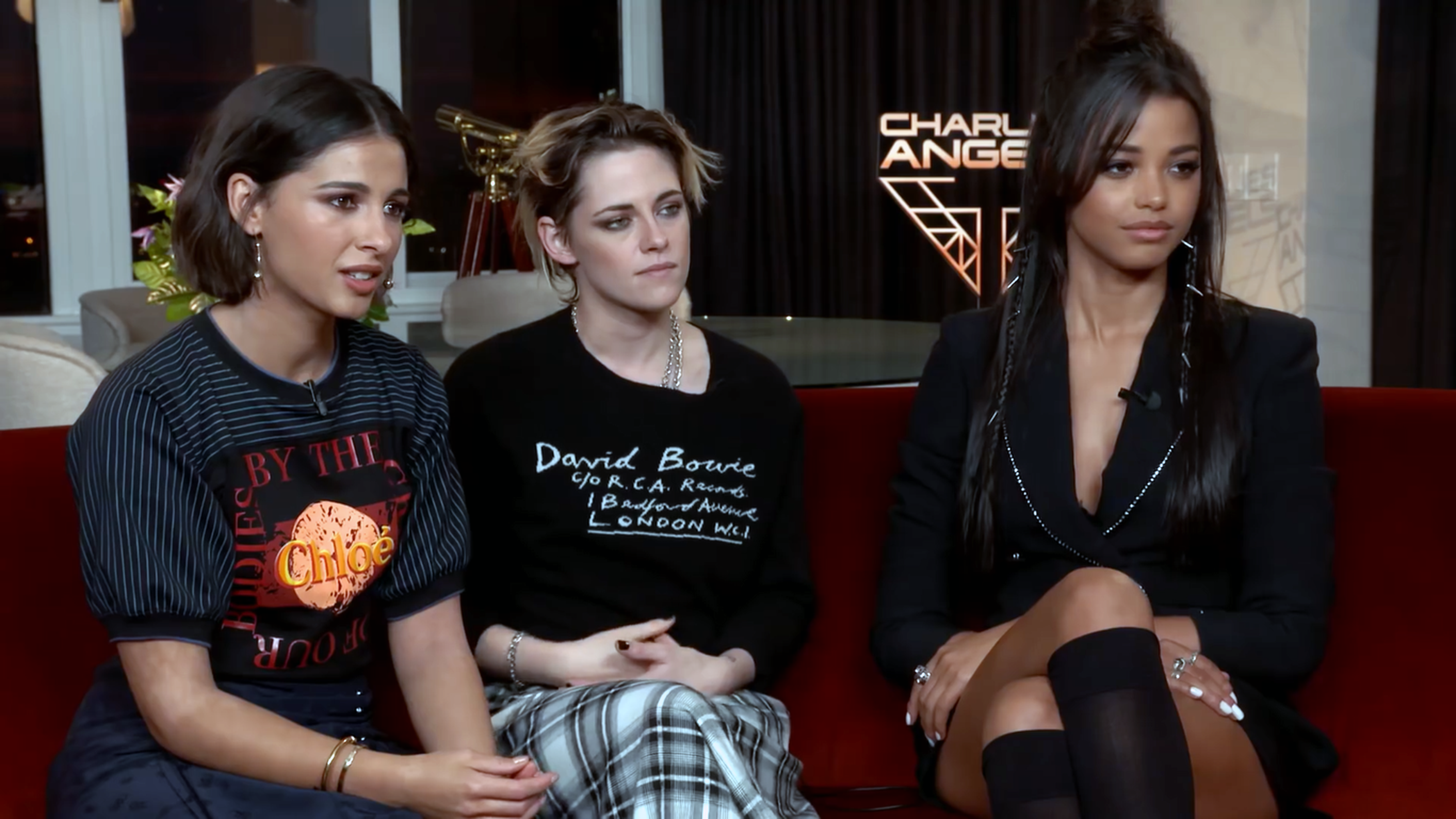
The cast of Charlie's Angels in 2019. From left to right: Scott, Kristen Stewart and Ella Balinska.

In 2019, Scott starred as Princess Jasmine in Aladdin, a live-action adaptation of Disney's 1992 animated film of the same name. Scott's casting over a "Middle Eastern or Arab actress" attracted comment. In his review for the San Francisco Chronicle, critic Mick LaSalle found Scott to be the "real star" of the film and that she "thrives and gives everything to her new power anthem ['Speechless']". Richard Roeper of Chicago Sun-Times wrote that Scott "absolutely sparkles" in her performance of "Speechless". For her role, Scott won the Teen Choice Award for Choice Movie Actress – Sci-Fi/Fantasy and also received a nomination for the Saturn Award for Best Supporting Actress. Aladdin was also commercially successful, grossing $1 billion at the box office. Also in 2019, Scott starred as one of the three leads, alongside Kristen Stewart and Ella Balinska, in the action comedy Charlie's Angels, the third installment within the franchise of the same name, released in November. The film received mixed reviews from critics.

In 2020, Scott was cast in the Netflix series Anatomy of a Scandal, as parliamentary aide Olivia Lytton which released in 2022, and in the science fiction film Long Distance. The film released in Vietnam on July 2024 but was released in the United States on Hulu on July 2025.

In 2023, Scott was cast as pop star Skye Riley in the horror film Smile 2, the second film in the Smile franchise. She drew inspiration from 2010s music and artists such as Lady Gaga and Britney Spears. She additionally performs songs for the film, which are featured on the extended play Smile 2: The Skye Riley EP. Released in 2024 to critical and commercial success, her performance drew acclaim from critics. Benjamin Lee of The Guardian called Scott "a fantastically committed goes-to-hell-and-back scream queen" and Owen Gleiberman of Variety believed she gave the film "a genuine emotional center." For the role, she won the Astra Award for Best Performance in a Horror or Thriller and was nominated for Best Actress at the Critics' Choice Super Awards and the Saturn Awards.Scott played Cass in the 2025 epic romance film Eternal Return. She performed at the American music festival Lollapalooza, which was held on Grant Park from July 31 to August 3 2025.

She stars in the upcoming stoner comedy film Wizards! Her debut album, F.I.G, was released on 20 March 2026.

== Personal life ==
Scott is a Christian. She is a UK ambassador to the Christian charity organisation Compassion International, sponsoring children and families living in poverty. She suffers from the skin condition eczema. She holds a black belt in karate, having studied it since her youth, which she credits as helpful with her roles in Power Rangers and Charlie's Angels.

In June 2014, Scott married English footballer Jordan Spence after four years of dating. The couple met at church when she was 16.

== Filmography ==
=== Film ===
Year	Title	Role	Notes
2012	Modern/Love	Harper	Short film
2013	Our Lady of Lourdes	Lourdes	Short film
2014	Hello, Again	Maura	Short film
2015	The 33	Escarlette Sepulveda Valdivia	
2017	Power Rangers	Kimberly Hart / Pink Ranger	
2019	Aladdin	Jasmine	
2019	Charlie's Angels	Elena Houghlin	
2024	Long Distance	Naomi Calloway	
2024	Smile 2	Skye Riley	
2025	Eternal Return	Cass	Also producer
TBA	Wizards!	TBA	Post-production

=== Television ===
Year	Title	Role	Notes
2009	Life Bites	Megan	11 episodes
2011	Sadie J	Clare	Episode 1: “Crushamondo”
2011	Lemonade Mouth	Mohini "Mo" Banjaree	Television film
2011	Terra Nova	Maddy Shannon	Main role
2013	By Any Means	Vanessa Velasquez	1 episode
2015	Inspector Lewis	Sahira Desai	2 episodes: "One For Sorrow: Part 1" and "One For Sorrow: Part 2"
2022	Anatomy of a Scandal	Olivia Lytton	5 episodes
2022	Modern Love Tokyo	Emma	Episode: “He Saved His Last Lesson For Me”
2027	Zoltar	TBA	Filming

=== Podcasts ===
- Soft Voice (2021) as Lydia

== Discography ==
=== Studio albums ===
List of extended plays and selected details
Title	Details
F.I.G	Released: 20 March 2026; Label: Alter Music; Format: CD, LP, digital download, streaming

=== Extended plays ===
List of extended plays and selected details
Title	Details
Invisible Division	Released: 25 August 2014; Format: Digital download, streaming; Label: Self-released
Promises	Released: 5 August 2016; Format: Digital download, streaming; Label: Self-released
Smile 2: The Skye Riley EP	Released: 11 October 2024; Format: LP, Digital download, streaming; Label: Interscope

=== Singles ===
==== As lead artist ====
List of singles as lead artist, showing year released and album name
Title	Year	Album
"Say Nothing"	2014	Invisible Division
"Motions"	2014	Invisible Division
"Lover's Lies"	2016	Promises
"Vows"	2017	Non-album singles
"Irrelevant" (featuring Nick Brewer)	2018	Non-album singles
"So Low"	2018	Non-album singles
"Undercover"	2018	Non-album singles
"You Say" (with Kinnship)	2019	Kinnship Presents: A Thousand Fibres
"Desert Moon" (with Mena Massoud)	2019	Non-album single
"Blood on White Satin"	2024	Smile 2: The Skye Riley EP
"Grieved You"	2024	Smile 2: The Skye Riley EP
"Rhythm" (with Johnny Yukon)	2025	F.I.G
"Cut Me Loose"	2025	F.I.G
"Cherry"	2025	F.I.G
"Sweet Nausea"	2025	F.I.G
"Losing You"	2026	F.I.G

==== As featured artist ====
List of singles as featured artist, showing year released, with selected chart positions and album name
Title	Year	Peak chart positions			Album
Title	Year	US	US Heat	UK	Album
"Breakthrough" (as part of Lemonade Mouth cast)	2011	88	11	200	Lemonade Mouth
"Fall From Here" (Nick Brewer featuring Naomi Scott)	2014	—	—	—	Four Miles Further
"—" denotes releases that did not chart or were not released in that territory.

==== Other charted songs ====
List of other charted songs, showing year released, with selected chart positions, certifications and album name
Title	Year	Peak chart positions					Certifications	Album
Title	Year	US Bub.	JPN	KOR	SCO	UK	Certifications	Album
"She's So Gone"	2011	3	—	—	—	—	RIAA: Platinum	Lemonade Mouth
"A Whole New World" (with Mena Massoud)	2019	—	19	13	43	—		Aladdin
"Speechless (Full)"	2019	23	40	5	25	73	BPI: Gold; RIAA: Platinum; KMCA: Platinum	Aladdin
"—" denotes releases that did not chart or were not released in that territory.

=== Guest appearances ===
List of other appearances, showing year released, other artist(s) credited and album name
Title	Year	Other artist(s)	Album
"More Than a Band"	2011	Lemonade Mouth cast	Lemonade Mouth
"Livin' on a High Wire"	2011	Lemonade Mouth cast	Lemonade Mouth
"Fall From Here (Jarreau Vandal Remix)"	2015	Nick Brewer	Warning Light
"Speechless (Part 1)"	2019	—N/a	Aladdin
"Speechless (Part 2)"	2019	—N/a	Aladdin

=== Music videos ===
List of music videos, showing year released, other artist(s) credited and director(s)
Title	Year	Other artist(s)	Director	Ref.
As lead artist
"Motions"	2014	None	Peter Szewczyk	
"Lover's Lies"	2017	None	Daniel Cummings	
"Vows"	2017	None	Naomi Scott	
"Speechless (Full)"	2019	None	Naomi Scott	
"A Whole New World"	2019	Mena Massoud	Guy Ritchie	
"Desert Moon"	2019	Mena Massoud	Guy Ritchie	
"Grieved You"	2024	None	Parker Finn	
"Rhythm"	2025	Johnny Yukon	Katharina Korbjuhn	
"Cut Me Loose"	2025	None	Kosar Ali, Naomi Scott	
"Cherry"	2025	None	Naomi Scott	
"Losing You"	2026	None	Andrew Norman Wilson	
"Gracie"	2026	None	Naomi Scott, Jordan Spence	
"Call For Me"	2026	None	Jordan Spence, Nano Clow	
As featured artist
"Fall From Here"	2014	Nick Brewer	Matthew Walker	
Guest appearances
"Hurricane"	2013	Bridgit Mendler	Robert Hales	

=== As a director ===
Title	Year	Artist(s)	Co-director	Ref.
"Forget You"	2019	Nick Brewer	Jordan Spence	

== Awards and nominations ==
Award	Year	Category	Work	Result	Ref.
Astra Film Awards	2024	Best Actress	Smile 2	Nominated	
Astra Film Awards	2024	Best Performance in a Horror or Thriller	Smile 2	Won	
Critics' Choice Super Awards	2025	Best Actress in a Horror Movie	Smile 2	Nominated	
Saturn Awards	2019	Best Supporting Actress	Aladdin	Nominated	
Saturn Awards	2025	Best Actress	Smile 2	Nominated	
Shorty Awards	2020	Best Actor	Herself	Nominated	
Teen Choice Awards	2017	Choice Sci-Fi Movie Actress	Power Rangers	Nominated	
Teen Choice Awards	2019	Choice Fantasy Movie Actress	Aladdin	Won	

== Tours ==
=== Headlining ===
- F.I.G Tour (2026)

=== Supporting ===
- Jessie Ware – The Superbloom Tour (2026)
