= F.I.G =

Studio album by Naomi Scott
- Released: 20 March 2026
- Recorded: 2021–2025
- Genres: R&B; alternative pop; soul; funk; dance-pop
- Length: 29:46
- Label: Alter
- Producers: Aksel Arvid; Botaii; Jack Dine; Goldwash; Endre Hereide; Dev Hynes; Lido

Naomi Scott chronology
Smile 2: The Skye Riley EP (2024)	F.I.G (2026)

Singles from F.I.G
- 1. "Rhythm" Released: 2 July 2025; 2. "Cut Me Loose" Released: 8 August 2025; 3. "Cherry" Released: 5 September 2025; 4. "Sweet Nausea" Released: 7 November 2025; 5. "Losing You" Released: 23 January 2026

F.I.G (an acronym for Fall Into Grace) is the debut studio album by English singer Naomi Scott. It was released on 20 March 2026 through Alter Music. Produced mostly by Lido, it is an R&B and alternative pop record that talks about missed paths, self-perception, and the pull between wanting and regretting.

Professional ratings
Review scores
Source	Rating
Pitchfork	8.0/10
The AU Review	4/5 stars

== Background ==
Scott began her career as an actress and gained recognition for starring in musical films such as Lemonade Mouth (2011), Aladdin (2019) and Smile 2 (2024), and performing on their official soundtracks. In the latter, she portrayed the fictional popstar Skye Riley and released a soundtrack extended play (EP), for which she co-wrote two songs. Outside of the soundtracks, she released two EPs, Invisible Division (2014) and Promises (2016). In 2018, Scott revealed that she was working on her first studio album.

Following the release of Smile 2, Scott was interviewed by Vogue Hong Kong, in which she confirmed that her album would come out next year. She revealed that she started working on it three years ago and that it was inspired by songs she grew up listening to on her father's Windows Media Player, and that it would have 'soulful 80s' vibe. The album is produced by Norwegian musician Lido.

== Title ==
The album's title is an acronym of Fall Into Grace. Scott stated that her middle name is Grace, and she wanted the album to be an exploration of different versions of herself: "Although it's not autobiographical necessarily, it is [more] putting myself in different contexts in terms of different paths that I have taken".

She also said that it was inspired by Sylvia Plath’s The Bell Jar where one of the characters "has a dream [where she's] sitting at the foot of this fig tree, and all the figs represent different versions of her life. Making this album allowed me to kind of sit in these different versions of myself, which was also a way of mourning other versions of my life as well."

== Promotion ==
To promote the album, Scott performed a rendition of the Lemonade Mouth song "She's So Gone", along with all of the songs from F.I.G live at the 2025 Lollapalooza, held in Chicago on 2 August. Scott embarked on the F.I.G Tour in North America, which ran from June 10 to June 20, 2026.

=== Singles ===
On 2 July 2025, "Rhythm" was released as the lead single from the album, and it featured vocals from Johnny Yukon. The song is about struggling with the push and pull of love. Euphoria. stated that ["she is by no means gunning to become one of the mainstream pop girlies. Or at least she's not going to try to emulate popular sound."] "Rhythm" is a dance-pop song. The second single "Cut Me Loose" was released on 8 August 2025. It has been described as an alternative pop ballad and an emotional soul pop song that talks about romantic self-destruction and lack of emotional clarity. The first version of "Cut Me Loose" was written in 2021 and she re-worked on it a year later.

On 5 September 2025, "Cherry" was released as the third single. The music video was directed by Scott herself. The song features elements of 90s pop combined with a dance melody and rhythmic drum beats. The fourth single, "Sweet Nausea" was released on 7 November 2025. The song was created in 15 minutes and it's a self-reflective track, which Scott describes as a 'carousel of regret'. On 23 January 2026, the fifth single "Losing You" was released, along with the announcement of the album. On 26 March 2026, Scott released a music video to the final song on the album "Gracie". On 4 June, Scott released a music video for "Call for Me".

== Track listing ==
F.I.G track listing
No.	Title	Lyrics	Music	Producer(s)	Length
1.	"Hellbent"	Naomi Scott	Scott; Botaii; Peder Losnegård	Lido; Botaii	2:19
2.	"Sweet Nausea"	Scott; Daphne Gale	Scott; Losnegård	Lido	2:05
3.	"Rhythm" (with Johnny Yukon)	Scott; John Lathrop Mitchell	Scott; Losnegård	Lido; Endre Hereide	2:37
4.	"Cut Me Loose"	Scott; Gale	Scott; Gabe Acheson; Losnegård	Lido; Jack Dine; Dev Hynes	2:27
5.	"Cherry"	Scott; Gale	Scott; Acheson; Losnegård	Lido	2:50
6.	"Call for Me"	Scott	Scott; Aksel Arvid; Losnegård	Lido; Arvid	2:32
7.	"Best Kind"	Scott	Scott; Losnegård	Lido	3:49
8.	"Bound"	Scott; Gale	Scott; Acheson; Losnegård	Lido	3:01
9.	"Losing You"	Scott; Gale	Scott; Losnegård	Lido; Goldwash	2:22
10.	"Bliss"	Scott	Scott; Losnegård	Lido	2:39
11.	"Gracie"	Scott	Scott; Losnegård	Lido	2:54
Total length:					29:46

== Personnel ==
Credits adapted from Tidal.

- Naomi Scott – vocals, background vocals
- Lido – engineering
- David Nakaji – mixing (tracks 1, 4, 6–10)
- Neal Pogue – mixing (2, 5, 9, 11)
- Zachary Acosta – mixing (3), mixing assistance (2, 5, 9, 11)
- Chris Gehringer – mastering
- Endre Hereide – bass guitar (3)
- Johnny Yukon – vocals (3)
- Jermaine Paul – bass guitar (4, 11)
- Kjell Harald Litangen – guitar (4)
- Justus West – guitar (5, 7, 11)
- Baird – guitar (6, 9)
- Gabe Acheson – guitar (6)
- Zach Ezzy – horns (8)
- Goldwash – guitar (9)
