= Karine Gonthier-Hyndman =

Canadian actress

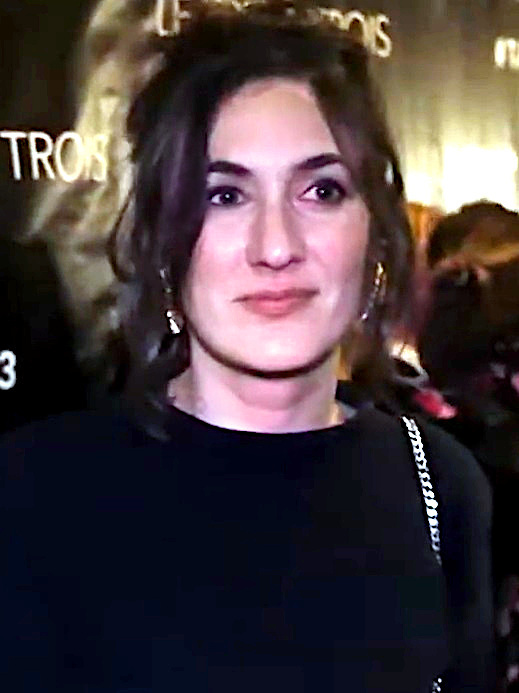
- Gonthier-Hyndman at the premiere of Threesome (Le Trip à trois)
- Born: August 8, 1984 (age 42); Ottawa, Ontario, Canada
- Occupation: actor
- Years active: 2000s-present
- Known for: Like-moi, Happily Married, Entre deux draps

Karine Gonthier-Hyndman (born August 8, 1984) is a Canadian actress from Quebec, most noted for her performances in the television series Like-moi, Les Simone, Happily Married (C'est comme ça que je t'aime) and Entre deux draps.

Born in Ottawa, Ontario, she moved to Montreal, Quebec as a teenager. She had a number of supporting roles in film and television before breaking through to wider fame as a cast member of the sketch comedy series Like-moi, which aired from 2015 to 2019. The cast received several nominations for comedy ensemble performance from the Gémeaux Awards, winning in 2018 and 2020. The cast of Entre deux draps won in the same category in 2021.

Her film roles have included First Snow (Première neige), Threesome (Le Trip à trois), Frimas, Falcon Lake, In Broad Daylight (Au grand jour), Two Women (Deux femmes en or) and L'Autre.

== Personal life ==
She is the niece of actor James Hyndman. She was formerly in a relationship with actor Guillaume Girard, who played her husband in Entre deux draps, although they were no longer still together by the time of the series premiere.
