= Peter Szewczyk =

American film director

- Born: Chicago, Illinois, United States
- Occupations: Director, cinematographer, animator
- Website: lightandmathematics.com

Peter Szewczyk is an American film and animation director, cinematographer and music video director.

Szewczyk began his film career at George Lucas' Skywalker Ranch and has contributed as an artist on a number of feature films, including the franchises Star Wars, Shrek, Harry Potter, and Avatar.

As a writer and director, Szewczyk partnered with the BBC for the short film "ColourBleed". He then cast Disney alumni Naomi Scott for the award-winning short film "Our Lady of Lourdes". He has also directed music videos for The Maccabees, Naomi Scott, and Skunk Anansie. In 2020 he directed his first feature film Behemoth.

He is represented in the UK, USA, Europe and South Africa by NERD Productions.

== Awards ==
- 2015 "Freederm Goose, Part 2" commercial wins Bronze for Best Animation at Kinsale Shark Awards 2015 in Ireland.
- 2014 "Freederm Goose" commercial wins Bronze for Best Animation at Epica Awards 2014.
- 2013 "Our Lady of Lourdes", HollyShorts Film Festival, Best VFX.
- 2013 "Our Lady of Lourdes", Chicago Horror Film Festival, Best Special FX
- 2012 "ColourBleed", Fantasporto, Best Short Film.
- 2011 "ColourBleed", HollyShorts Film Festival, Best International Short.
- 2011 "ColourBleed", Sitges Film Festival, Special Jury Prize.

== Filmography ==
=== Music videos ===
Year	Song	Artist
2014	Motions	Naomi Scott
2014	Tell me	Numbers And Letters
2013	Swiftly Siren	ÍRiS
2011	Talk To Much	Skunk Anansie
2010	Young Lions	The Maccabees

=== Short films ===
Year	Film	Role
2014	Recurring Symptoms	Director
2013	Our Lady of Lourdes	Writer, director
2011	Your Crooked Heart	Director
2011	ColourBleed	Writer, director
2009	Dark Clouds	Director

=== Other filmography ===
Year	Film	Role
2015	Zero	Additional Content Director
2013	Thor: The Dark World	Sequence Supervisor
2011	Harry Potter and the Deathly Hallows	Look Development
2009	Avatar	Lighting Technical Director
2007	Harry Potter and the Order of the Phoenix	Sequence Lead (Light and Compositing)
2006	Ice Age: The Meltdown	Lighting and Compositing Technical Director
2005	Madagascar	Lighting and Compositing Technical Director
2005	Star Wars: Episode III – Revenge of the Sith	Pre-Visualization
2004	Shrek 2	Lighting and Compositing Technical Director
2001	Gary & Mike (tv series)	Visual Effects Supervisor
