= François Létourneau =

Canadian actor and writer (born 1974)

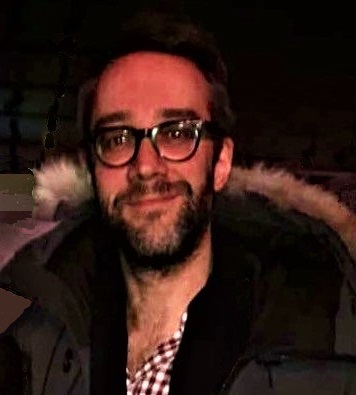
- Born: 1974 (age 51–52); Sainte-Foy, Quebec
- Occupations: actor, writer
- Writing career
- Notable works: Les Invincibles, Série noire, Cheech

François Létourneau (born 1974 in Sainte-Foy, Quebec) is a Canadian actor and writer, best known as co-creator and star of the television series Les Invincibles, Série noire and Happily Married (C'est comme ça que je t'aime).

He studied political science at Université Laval in the 1990s, while pursuing acting work in theatre as an extracurricular hobby, and then studied theatre at the Conservatoire d'art dramatique de Montréal, where he graduated in 1999.

He was a shortlisted Governor General's Award finalist for Governor General's Award for French-language drama at the 2003 Governor General's Awards for his theatrical play Cheech, ou Les hommes de Chrysler sont en ville, and a shortlisted Genie Award nominee for Best Adapted Screenplay at the 23rd Genie Awards in 2006 for the film adaptation Cheech.

He was shortlisted for the Prix Gémeaux for Best Writing in a Drama Series in 2009 for Les Invincibles, and won two Gémeaux in 2014, for Best Actor in a Drama and Best Writing in a Drama for Série noire. He was nominated again in both categories in 2016 for the second season of Série noire, but did not win.

His other roles have included the films Québec-Montréal, Funkytown, Paul à Québec, Billie Blue (Cœur de slush) and Haunted (Hantée), and the television series Les Hauts et les bas de Sophie Paquin and Les Rescapés.
