= Trevor Newlin =

American actor (born 1996)

- Born: Longview, Texas
- Citizenship: American
- Education: New York Film Academy
- Occupation: Actor
- Known for: Alien: Romulus; Smile 2 Superman
- Height: 6 ft 7 in (201 cm)

Trevor Newlin (October 14, 1996) is an American actor, better known for the portrayal of monstrous characters in films such as the Xenomorph in the science fiction movie Alien: Romulus (2024), the Smile Entity in the psychological horror movie Smile 2 (2024), Mr. Handsome on the superhero movie Superman (2025) and as the creature from the upcoming horror movie titled Help Me. Furthermore, he starred in many commercial campaigns, with the most famous being the "Amazon Yeti" for Amazon's Black Friday campaign.

== Biography ==
Newlin was born on October 14, 1996, in Longview, Texas. He moved to Los Angeles to pursue a career in acting, and he graduated from the New York Film Academy in 2019. He is 6'7" tall.

He was mentored by actor Doug Jones (better known as the Faun in Pan's Labyrinth, the Amphibian Man in The Shape of Water and Saru from Star Trek: Discovery) who helped him improve his craft as a monster actor and performer.
