= Smile 2 =

2024 film by Parker Finn

- Theatrical release poster
- Directed by: Parker Finn
- Written by: Parker Finn
- Produced by: Marty Bowen; Wyck Godfrey; Isaac Klausner; Parker Finn; Robert Salerno
- Starring: Naomi Scott; Rosemarie DeWitt; Miles Gutierrez-Riley; Kyle Gallner
- Cinematography: Charlie Sarroff
- Edited by: Elliot Greenberg
- Music by: Cristobal Tapia de Veer
- Production companies: Temple Hill Entertainment; Bad Feeling
- Distributed by: Paramount Pictures
- Release date: October 18, 2024
- Running time: 127 minutes
- Country: United States
- Language: English
- Budget: $28 million
- Box office: $138.1 million

Smile 2 is a 2024 American supernatural psychological horror film written and directed by Parker Finn. A sequel to Smile (2022), the film stars Naomi Scott as Skye Riley, a pop star who begins to experience a series of increasingly disturbing events just as she is about to embark on tour. It also features Rosemarie DeWitt and Miles Gutierrez-Riley with Kyle Gallner reprising his role from the first film.

In March 2023, following the commercial success of Smile, Finn signed a first-look deal with Paramount Pictures for future horror projects. In the following April, a sequel to Smile had entered pre-production, with Finn returning as writer and director. Principal photography took place in early 2024 in upstate New York.

Smile 2 was released theatrically in the United States on October 18, 2024. It received generally positive reviews from critics and grossed $138.1 million worldwide. Among the film's accolades, it received four nominations at the 52nd Saturn Awards, including Best Horror Film and Best Actress for Scott. A sequel is in development, with David Bruckner as director and Nick Antosca as screenwriter.

== Plot ==
Six days after Rose Cotter's death, (Note: As depicted in Smile (2022)) the now-cursed Joel attempts to pass the Smile Entity on by killing one murderous criminal in front of another. He accidentally kills the witness in a shootout, and drug dealer Lewis Fregoli, whom Joel had not previously noticed, inherits the curse as a bystander. Joel tries to flee when more criminals arrive, but is run over and killed by an oncoming pick-up truck.

Meanwhile, New York-based pop star Skye Riley appears on The Drew Barrymore Show as she prepares for her comeback tour following a public struggle with substance abuse and a car crash that killed her actor boyfriend, Paul Hudson. Despite constant supervision from her mother/manager Elizabeth, Skye sneaks out to buy Vicodin from Lewis, her high school friend, after injuring her back in rehearsals. After Skye arrives at Lewis' apartment, Lewis begins screaming and panicking before being possessed by the Entity. While Skye watches, Lewis rises, smiling, and fatally smashes his face in with a barbell plate, traumatizing Skye and passing the curse onto her. Afraid of being found with Lewis's corpse and a room full of drugs, Skye leaves without alerting the authorities.

Skye is plagued by relentless visions, including hallucinations of Paul, her assistant Joshua and a disfigured Lewis smiling at her, causing her mental health to rapidly deteriorate. Needing support, she reconciles with her estranged friend Gemma. Skye receives a text from an unknown number, claiming to know she was at Lewis's apartment and that she is in danger. When the hallucinations become overwhelming, Skye decides to meet this contact in a bar. There, the mystery texter is revealed to be an ER nurse named Morris, who explains the nature of the curse to her and tells her he has been tracking the Entity ever since it killed his brother. Theorizing that the Entity is parasitic and could die without a host, he suggests stopping Skye's heart and then resuscitating her to break the curse, but she refuses and leaves after being recognized by bargoers. Arriving back at her apartment, Skye is cornered by the Entity, which takes the form of her backup dancers. Skye tries to escape but is violently thrown around the apartment and pinned down as a giant arm forces its way into her throat, causing her to black out.

A flashback reveals that Skye caused Paul's death by intentionally crashing the car during a drug-induced argument. Skye awakens at a retreat and argues with Elizabeth over the upcoming tour. Suddenly, Elizabeth smiles, smashes a mirror, and fatally stabs herself with a shard. Skye attempts to leave but, to her horror, realizes that it was she who stabbed Elizabeth. She attracts attention from the hospital workers and Joshua when seen covered in blood. Skye escapes the retreat and reunites with Gemma, stealing a car to meet Morris. She receives a call from the real Gemma and realizes that the "Gemma" who is in the vehicle with her, and with whom she has spent the entire week, is the Entity. After regaining control of the car, Skye meets Morris at an abandoned Pizza Hut, where he plans to use the walk-in freezer to prevent brain damage when stopping her heart. Morris temporarily leaves and the Entity appears as Skye's former self from the car wreck. After a struggle, she fights it off and injects herself with the syringe meant to stop her heart. Unfazed, the Entity mockingly affirms that Skye is not in control.

Skye then finds herself onstage for her opening tour performance at Herald Square Garden. (Note: A fictional version of Madison Square Garden) She sees a still-alive Elizabeth watching from the audience, and realizes that the entire day has been an illusion. The Entity appears as Skye's current self before tearing its stomach open from where its true form emerges; a giant, skinless, semi-humanoid creature with multiple smiling mouths on its body. Skye screams and falls into a trance, before the Entity possesses her. Now smiling menacingly, Skye fatally stabs herself in the eye with her microphone in front of thousands of horrified spectators.

== Cast ==
- Naomi Scott as Skye Riley, a famous pop music recording artist
- Rosemarie DeWitt as Elizabeth Riley, Skye's mother and manager
- Lukas Gage as Lewis Fregoli, a drug dealer and Skye's former classmate
- Miles Gutierrez-Riley as Joshua, Elizabeth and Skye's assistant
- Peter Jacobson as Morris, a nurse who tracked the Smile Entity's actions
- Ray Nicholson as Paul Hudson, a deceased actor and Skye's former boyfriend
- Dylan Gelula as Gemma, Skye's estranged best friend
- Raúl Castillo as Darius, the head of Skye's record company
- Kyle Gallner as Joel, a police officer who previously was cursed by the Smile Entity

Additionally, Drew Barrymore appears as herself, interviewing Skye on her talk show, while director Parker Finn himself cameos as a photographer, and Vladimir Duthiers and Kristine Johnson appear as themselves in a CBS News segment. The likeness of Sosie Bacon as Rose Cotter appears via a hallucination to Joel. Trevor Newlin appears as the Smile Entity in its true form.

== Production ==
=== Development ===
Smile writer and director Parker Finn intentionally left portions of the first film ambiguous, with various plotlines unresolved, to create the opportunity to explore those details in a sequel. He noted that while additional installments may explore the backstory of the entity, he would like to keep its mysterious nature intact, adding that a follow-up film would be notably different from the first as he believed "there is still a lot of interesting stuff to explore in the world of Smile. ... I'd want to make sure that there's a new, exciting, fresh way into it that the audience isn't anticipating." In March 2023, following the commercial success of Smile, Finn signed a first-look deal with Paramount Pictures to develop additional horror projects. The following month at 2023 CinemaCon, Paramount announced that a sequel to Smile had been green-lit and was in pre-production, with Finn returning as writer and director.

In October 2024, Finn described the film as "an exploration of the downfall of this pop star who's unable to overcome the things that have been put upon her." He added, "What I love about the ending of this film is that I wanted to create this meta-feeling moment, where the audience in the arena is staring through the screen at the audience in the movie theater. I wanted to raise the question: Did we do this to Skye? By us coming back for a Smile 2, have we done this to her? It's all intriguing to me, this idea of 'are we complicit in this?'"

=== Casting ===
In December 2023, Naomi Scott was cast in a leading role, which she stated was inspired by Lady Gaga in the early 2010s as well as Britney Spears. In early 2024, Lukas Gage, Rosemarie DeWitt, Dylan Gelula, Raúl Castillo and Miles Gutierrez-Riley joined the cast. Kyle Gallner reprised his role as Joel from the first film. In September 2024, it was revealed Drew Barrymore would appear as herself in the film. The casting of Ray Nicholson was an homage to his father Jack Nicholson's role as Jack Torrance in The Shining (1980). Principal photography took place from January to March 2024 throughout the Hudson Valley in New York, with primary locations in Newburgh, Poughkeepsie, Wappingers Falls, Albany, and New York City. Returning Smile crew members included cinematographer Charlie Sarroff, editor Elliot Greenberg, and composer Cristobal Tapia de Veer. The film's budget was $28 million.

== Music ==
=== Soundtrack ===
Smile 2: The Skye Riley EP

EP soundtrack by Skye Riley
- Released: October 11, 2024
- Length: 17:58
- Label: Interscope
- Producer: Idarose

Naomi Scott chronology
Promises (2016)	Smile 2: The Skye Riley EP (2024)	F.I.G (2026)

Singles from Smile 2: The Skye Riley EP
- 1. "Blood on White Satin" Released: June 18, 2024; 2. "Grieved You" Released: September 11, 2024

Smile 2: The Skye Riley EP is the third extended play (EP) by English actress and singer Naomi Scott, which acts as the soundtrack album for Smile 2, and the songs were performed by her character Skye Riley. It was released through Interscope Records on October 11, 2024.

On June 8, 2024, the @SkyeRileyNation Instagram account began teasing a new era of a popstar named Skye Riley. On June 13, Bloody Disgusting spotted promotional billboards promoting the artist and her new music. On June 18, a song titled "Blood on White Satin" was released through Interscope Records and was featured in the first trailer of the film. The film was promoted with an audience member at the 2024 MTV Video Music Awards. The second single, "Grieved You", was released on September 13. The EP was made available on vinyl on May 15, 2025.

Smile 2: The Skye Riley EP track listing
No.	Title	Writer(s)	Producer(s)	Length
1.	"Grieved You"	Tate McRae; Roy Lenzo; Amy Allen; Denzel Baptiste; David Biral	Take a Daytrip	2:40
2.	"New Brain"	Alexis Kesselman; Paul Bogum; Keven Wolfsohn	Idarose	3:05
3.	"Just My Name"	Naomi Scott; Kesselman	Idarose	3:32
4.	"Blood on White Satin"	Kesselman	Idarose	2:43
5.	"Death of Me"	Scott; Kesselman	Idarose	2:46
6.	"Just My Name" (piano version)	Scott; Kesselman	Idarose	3:15
Total length:				17:58

=== Score ===
Smile 2 (Music from the Motion Picture)

Film score by Cristobal Tapia de Veer
- Released: October 25, 2024
- Length: 53:58
- Label: Lakeshore
- Producer: Cristobal Tapia de Veer

Cristobal Tapia de Veer chronology
The White Lotus: Season 2 (Soundtrack from the HBO Original Series) (2022)	Smile 2 (Music from the Motion Picture) (2024)	Babygirl (Original Soundtrack) (2024)

Singles from Smile 2 (Music from the Motion Picture)
- 1. "Smilers" Released: October 24, 2024

The score for Smile 2 was composed by Cristobal Tapia de Veer, who returned after scoring the first film. It was released on October 25, 2024, through Lakeshore Records, with "Smilers" being released a day earlier through ComingSoon.net.

All tracks are written by Cristobal Tapia de Veer.

Smile 2 (Music from the Motion Picture) track listing
No.	Title	Length
1.	"Hollowed Out"	4:04
2.	"Smile"	3:40
3.	"Life Sober"	1:06
4.	"Scars"	0:51
5.	"OD'ing"	2:39
6.	"Deluxe"	1:19
7.	"Photoshoot"	1:05
8.	"Cheese"	3:05
9.	"Man"	2:41
10.	"Not Your Fault"	0:32
11.	"Words of Wisdom"	0:35
12.	"What Did You Say?"	0:40
13.	"Prepare"	1:02
14.	"Vanity Room"	0:38
15.	"A Woman Who Keeps Her Word"	0:47
16.	"Phone Screen"	1:44
17.	"Anxiety"	1:22
18.	"Smilers"	3:27
19.	"Inside Your Head"	2:46
20.	"Escape"	6:27
21.	"Drive"	1:00
22.	"Redemption"	1:32
23.	"Break a Leg"	2:45
24.	"Showtime"	5:01
25.	"Smile End Credits Bonus"	2:58

== Release ==
Smile 2 was released in the United States by Paramount Pictures on October 18, 2024. It was released on premium video on demand (PVOD) on November 19, 2024, and on 4K Ultra HD Blu-ray, 4K Ultra HD SteelBook and DVD on January 21, 2025.

== Reception ==
=== Box office ===
Smile 2 grossed $69 million in the United States and Canada, and $69.1 million in other territories, for a worldwide total of $138.1 million. Deadline Hollywood calculated the film made a net profit of $55.4 million.

In the United States and Canada, Smile 2 was projected to gross $17–25 million from 3,619 theaters in its opening weekend. The film made $9.5 million on its first day, including an estimated $2.5 million in previews. The film went on to debut to $23 million, topping the original's $22.6 million debut and finishing first at the box office. The film made $9.5 million in its second weekend, finishing second behind newcomer Venom: The Last Dance.

=== Critical response ===
On the review aggregator website Rotten Tomatoes, 86% of 213 critics' reviews are positive. The website's consensus reads: "Blessed with a nerve-jangling star turn by Naomi Scott, writer-director Parker Finn broadens Smile's conceit into a pop stardom nightmare that'll leave a rictus grin on horror fans' faces." Rotten Tomatoes also reported that critics thought the film was an improvement over its predecessor and "every review" praised Scott's performance. Metacritic, which uses a weighted average, assigned the film a score of 67 out of 100, based on 37 critics, indicating "generally favorable" reviews. Audiences polled by CinemaScore gave the film an average grade of "B" on an A+ to F scale (up from the first film's "B-"), while those surveyed by PostTrak gave it a 71% overall positive score (including an average of 3½ out of 5 stars).

Writing for Polygon, Austen Goslin gave a positive review for the film, deeming it superior to the first, while stating: "Rather than simply rehashing the original, Parker Finn pushes his clever premise to its logical extreme and builds some incredibly scary scenes to match. In fact, Finn ends Smile 2 in a spot that feels like the perfect conclusion to the franchise — and the perfect jumping-off point for the career of one of the most exciting horror directors of his generation." David Fear of Rolling Stone wrote, "There are long stretches where you actually forget you're watching a Smile movie and couldn't be blamed for thinking you've stumbled into a slightly more nightmarish version of Beyond the Lights." Benjamin Lee of The Guardian gave the film 3/5 stars, writing, "I'm not sure if Smile 2 really adds much to an experience that we don't already know but it does make for a neat, well-utilised setting for a horror film about losing one's mind." Variety's Owen Gleiberman said, "The movie is hardly subtle, yet Parker Finn has become a clever enough filmmaker to make reality feel like a hallucination and hallucinations feel like reality."

Bilge Ebiri of Vulture was more critical, writing, "As Skye becomes increasingly unable to tell what's actually happening and what's a waking nightmare, we should feel more for her, and we should feel more with her. Instead, we lose interest, as the whole thing becomes pointless and even a little cynical and cruel. The movie ultimately scuttles its own ambitions." NME's James Mottram said, "Sadly, Smile 2 doesn't feel as fresh as its predecessor. Partly because it borrows liberally from films like Flatliners (and tries to out-gore The Substance for all the bloody prosthetics)... in essence this is just a re-run of the first movie, just in a slightly glitzier environment."

=== Accolades ===
Award/Festival	Date of ceremony	Category	Recipient(s)	Result	Ref.
The Astra Awards	December 8, 2024	Best Horror or Thriller Feature	Smile 2	Nominated	
The Astra Awards	December 8, 2024	Best Actress	Naomi Scott	Nominated	
The Astra Awards	December 8, 2024	Best Performance in a Horror or Thriller	Naomi Scott	Won	
Make-Up Artists and Hair Stylists Guild Awards	February 15, 2025	Best Contemporary Make-Up	Sasha Grossman, Valerie Carney	Nominated	
Saturn Awards	February 2, 2025	Best Horror Film	Smile 2	Nominated	
Saturn Awards	February 2, 2025	Best Actress in a Film	Naomi Scott	Nominated	
Saturn Awards	February 2, 2025	Best Film Make Up	Smile 2	Nominated	
Saturn Awards	February 2, 2025	Best Film Music	Cristobal Tapia de Veer	Nominated	
Golden Trailer Awards	May 29, 2025	Best Horror TV Spot (for a Feature Film)	Paramount / Create Advertising Group (for "Run")	Won	
Critics' Choice Super Awards	August 7, 2025	Best Actress in a Horror Movie	Naomi Scott	Nominated	
Fangoria Chainsaw Awards	October 19, 2025	Best Lead Performance	Naomi Scott	Nominated	
Fangoria Chainsaw Awards	October 19, 2025	Best Creature FX	Millennium FX, Morphology, Jeremy Selenfriend, and Studio Gillis	Nominated	

== Future ==
In September 2024, writer/director Parker Finn confirmed plans to continue the franchise with a third film; stating: "...we've maybe only scooped a single glass of water out of the ocean. ...I think it's really fun to imagine a lineage of Smile movies where each one becomes more off the rails than the previous one." In December, it was reported that Smile 3 was in the works and is set to start filming in 2026. In October 2026, David Bruckner was announced as director and Nick Antosca as writer.
