= Édith Cochrane =

Canadian actress

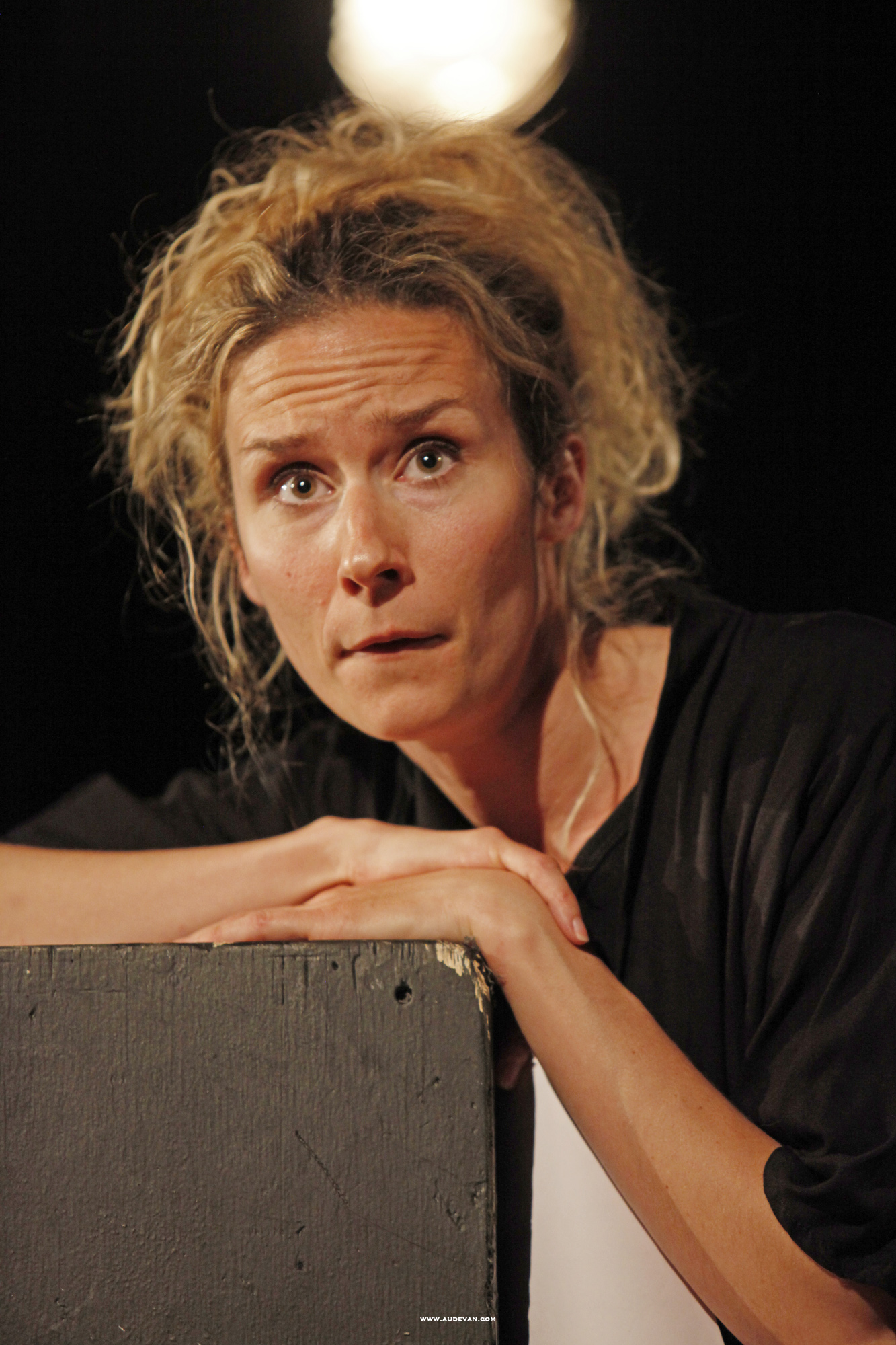
- Édith Cochrane in 2011.
- Born: August 10, 1977 (age 48); Amos, Quebec, Canada
- Occupations: Actress; Television presenter

Édith Cochrane (born August 10, 1977 (age 48) in Amos) is a Canadian actress and television host from Quebec. She is known for her role as Sandra in the TV series Les Invincibles. She also appeared in Aurélie Laflamme, playing France Charbonneau, and in Noémie: Le Secret, portraying the teacher Cynthia. She stars in the youth series Kaboum as Pétronille (aka Karmadore Assomia). In Unité 9, she plays Lisa Côté, a visually impaired psychologist.

In September 2014, she became co-host of the television show Les Enfants de la télé alongside André Robitaille.

== Biography ==
=== Education ===
Édith Cochrane studied French and history education at the UQAM. Unlike many other actors, she did not pursue formal theater studies.

=== Personal life ===
She is married to actor Emmanuel Bilodeau and they have three children: Siméon, Paul-Émile, and Adélaïde.

== Voice acting ==
=== Animated films ===
- 2015: Inside Out – Disgust

== Filmography ==
=== Film ===
- 2005: La Dernière Incarnation directed by Demian Fuica – Julie
- 2007: Le Ring directed by Anaïs Barbeau-Lavalette – Teacher
- 2008: Dans une galaxie près de chez vous 2 directed by Philippe Gagnon – Governor's receptionist
- 2009: Noémie: Le Secret directed by Frédérik D'Amours – Cynthia
- 2010: Le Journal d'Aurélie Laflamme directed by Christian Laurence – France Charbonneau
- 2012: Les Pee-Wee 3D: L'hiver qui a changé ma vie directed by Éric Tessier – Sylvie Morneau
- 2013: Hot-Dog directed by Marc-André Lavoie – Sonia
- 2015: Aurélie Laflamme: Les Pieds sur terre directed by Nicolas Monette – France Charbonneau
- 2017: Junior majeur directed by Éric Tessier – Sylvie Morneau
- 2021: Une révision directed by Catherine Therrien – Sylvie Lambert
- 2023: Des hommes, la nuit directed by Anh Minh Truong – Myriam
- 2023: Sur la Terre comme au ciel directed by Nathalie Saint-Pierre – Louise
- 2024: Tous toqués! directed by Manon Briand – Farmer

=== Television ===
- 2004: Le Sketch Show – Various roles
- 2005: Les Invincibles – Sandra Michaud
- 2005: Totale Impro – Friend of Noémie
- 2005: Cover Girl – Mathilde
- 2010: Tranches de vie – Claire Lussier
- 2010: Kaboum – Pétronille (Assomia)
- 2012: MDR – Herself (guest)
- 2012: Unité 9 – Lisa Côté
- 2014: Les Parent – Sylvie (Cédrik's mother)
- 2014: Série noire – Judith
- 2014: Complexe G – Karine
- 2016: Web Thérapie – Florence Champagne
- 2021: C'est plus qu'un jardin – Herself
- 2023: Inspirez expirez – Antara Yoni (Carolanne)
