= Ici TOU.TV =

French Canadian video-on-demand website run by the CBC

ICI TOU.TV

- Screenshot of the website as seen on February 14, 2010.
- Website type: Video on demand
- Available in: French
- Headquarters: Montreal, Quebec, Canada
- Owner: Canadian Broadcasting Corporation
- Industry: Web television
- Parent: Ici Radio-Canada Télé
- Website: ici.tou.tv
- IPv6 support: Yes
- Advertising: Yes
- Registration: Optional; required for contents with the Extra label
- Launched: January 26, 2010
- Current status: active

Ici TOU.TV (stylized as ICI TOU.TV, and sometimes abbreviated as TOU.TV) is a French Canadian, video-on-demand website launched on January 26, 2010, by the Canadian Broadcasting Corporation, currently branded CBC/Radio-Canada. "Ici" in the name means "here" in French, while "tou" is a phonetic spelling of the word "tout," which means "all" or "everything". Together, the name roughly translates to "Here, [there is] all/everything [that's on] TV."

ICI TOU.TV, a French-language streaming service, offers primarily French and Québécois (French Canadian) content, including movies, series, documentaries, entertainment, etc. They also offer some content from English-speaking countries like the US, UK, and the rest of Canada. English-language content is generally dubbed in French, without subtitles.

ICI TOU.TV uses geolocation and is only legally available in Canada.

CBC/Radio-Canada also offers an English-language streaming service, CBC Gem, which includes a large library of English-language content, as well as some French- and other foreign-language content. The non-English content is generally offered with English subtitles however, without dubbing.

CBC Gem and ICI TOU.TV are both free to watch in Canada, with ads. They also offer premium, ad-free memberships for a monthly price ($5.99 and $8.99 before taxes, respectively). Premium membership with one service does not give you Premium access to the other—though they are both CBC/Radio-Canada streaming services, they each require their own membership. Both services offer free trials, generally 7 days.

== History ==
At launch, the site offered 2000 hours of French-language television content, near high definition in quality, provided by several TV channels, such as Ici Radio-Canada Télé, Ici RDI, Ici ARTV, Télé-Québec, TV5Monde, TV5 Québec Canada, TFO, Radio Canada International, RTS (Switzerland) and RTBF (Belgium).

In February 2014, the site was re-branded as Ici TOU.TV as part of a plan to unify the CBC's French-language outlets around a single brand.

In May 2018, it was announced that Bell Media, the National Film Board of Canada, TV5 Québec Canada, and V Media Group would contribute content to TOU.TV's premium Extra tier, as part of an effort to better compete with Netflix on the availability of Québécois and French-language content. Other distributors such as Télé-Quebec later joined the partnership.

Bell Media left the partnership after the company's rival service, Crave, expanded into the French-language market. As a result, all of their content previously found on Ici TOU.TV has since moved to the aforementioned service. The V section was also removed later on after Bell Media bought the network from V Media Group. In December 2025, Bell later announced a partnership with Radio-Canada to offer a bundle of its own streaming service Crave (which includes content from its French networks Super Écran and Noovo) with Ici TOU.TV Extra.

== Available contents and sections ==
Contents found on the service mostly include original series from Radio-Canada's television networks and streaming services, as well as acquisitions from other distributors. While some can be watched for free with advertisement, those with the Extra label require a paid subscription to the service so that it can be accessed. Following the website rebrand in May 2018, contents are placed into sections such as the following:

=== Current ===
- Création Ici Tou.tv
- Extra
- Véro.tv
- Zone Jeunesse
- Zone Ados
- Ici Radio-Canada Télé
- Ici Explora
- Ici ARTV
- Ici RDI
- Télé-Québec
- TV5/UnisTV/TV5MondePlus
- France TV
- rtbf.be
- TFO
- AMI-télé
- Canal+ Grand Écran

== Devices Supported ==
The ICI TOU.TV streaming platform supports access through most modern web browsers on Windows and macOS, as well as apps for iOS/iPadOS, Android and Android TV devices, LG and Samsung Smart TVs, Apple TV, Xbox One, Xbox Series X/S, Amazon Fire TV, Chromecast, Roku, Rogers Xfinity TV, Helix TV and Telus Optik TV set top boxes. It was previously available as an app on BlackBerry, Windows 8, Xbox 360 and Rogers Cable set top boxes.

== Geo-Location and Availability ==
ICI TOU.TV is geo-located and is only available in Canada.
