= List of American films of 2027 =

This is a list of American films that are scheduled for release in 2027.

== January–March ==
Opening		Title	Production company	Cast and crew	Ref.
J A N U A R Y	1	Pendulum	Vertical / Protozoa Pictures	Mark Heyman (director/screenplay); Joseph Gordon-Levitt, Phoebe Dynevor, Jacki Weaver, Norman Reedus	
J A N U A R Y	8	Hurricanna	Magenta Light Studios	Francesca Gregorini (director); Rachel Sarnoff, Matt Sarnoff (screenplay); Sylvia Hoeks, Holly Hunter, Mark Duplass, Nicholas Hamilton, Kevin Sussman, Michael Nouri	
J A N U A R Y	8	The Liberation	Bleecker Street / Image Nation Studios / Spooky Pictures	Guy Nattiv (director/screenplay); Noa Berman-Herzberg (screenplay); Carrie Coon, Bella Ramsey, Odessa Young, Lily James	
J A N U A R Y	8	Billy Knight	Magenta Edge Films	Alec Griffen Roth (director/screenplay); Al Pacino, Charlie Heaton, Diana Silvers, Patrick Schwarzenegger, Angela Sarafyan	
J A N U A R Y	15	Children of Blood and Bone	Paramount Pictures / Temple Hill Entertainment	Gina Prince-Bythewood (director/screenplay); Tomi Adeyemi (screenplay); Thuso Mbedu, Damson Idris, Amandla Stenberg, Tosin Cole, Cynthia Erivo, Lashana Lynch, Zackary Momoh, Richard Mofe-Damijo, Chiwetel Ejiofor, Regina King, Idris Elba, Viola Davis	
J A N U A R Y	15	The Beekeeper 2	Metro-Goldwyn-Mayer / Miramax / Punch Palace Productions	Timo Tjahjanto (director); Umair Aleem (screenplay); Jason Statham, Emmy Raver-Lampman, Bobby Naderi, Jemma Redgrave, Jeremy Irons, Yara Shahidi, Pom Klementieff, Adam Copeland	
J A N U A R Y	15	River	Universal Pictures / Blumhouse Atomic / Independent Film Company / Shudder / Spooky Pictures	Joshua Giuliano (director/screenplay); Jane Levy, Jessica Rothe, Max Mattern, Dane DiLiegro	
J A N U A R Y	15	The Take	Netflix / Genre Films	Fernando Meirelles (director); Simon Kinberg (screenplay); Denzel Washington, Robert Pattinson, Daisy Edgar-Jones, Danai Gurira, Sean Harris, Moisés Arias, Justin Kirk	
J A N U A R Y	22	Animal Friends	Warner Bros. Pictures / Legendary Pictures / Maximum Effort / Prime Focus Studios	Peter Atencio (director); Kevin Burrows, Matt Mider (screenplay); Ryan Reynolds, Jason Momoa, Aubrey Plaza, Dan Levy, Vince Vaughn	
J A N U A R Y	22	Lords of War	Vertical / Saturn Films	Andrew Niccol (director/screenplay); Nicolas Cage, Bill Skarsgård, Laura Harrier, Sylvia Hoeks, Greg Tarzan Davis	
J A N U A R Y	22	Air Bud Returns	Cineverse	Robert Vince (director/screenplay); Aydin Artis, Tracy Ifeachor, Edwin Lee Gibson, Tyler Labine, Erik Gow, Maxim Swinton	
J A N U A R Y	22	The Third Parent	Bleecker Street	Daniel Michaels (director/screenplay); Rob Lowe, Roselyn Sánchez, Crispin Glover	
J A N U A R Y	27	Imaginal Disk	Another Video	Amanda Kramer (director); Mica Tenenbaum, Matthew Lewin (screenplay); Mica Tenenbaum, Matthew Lewin, James Jelin, Liza Babin, Megan Seely	
J A N U A R Y	29	The Rescue	Paramount Pictures / Spyglass Media Group / Hideout Pictures	Potsy Ponciroli (director); John Fusco (screenplay); Brandon Sklenar, Josh Lucas, Hassie Harrison, Lorelei Olivia Mote, Nick Searcy, Austin Amelio, Spencer Treat Clark, Tim Blake Nelson, Josh Duhamel	
J A N U A R Y	29	Slayground	A24	Jeremy Saulnier (director/screenplay); Cory Michael Smith, Chase Sui Wonders, Stanley Simons, Sophie Wilde, Young Mazino, Imogen Poots, Matty Matheson, James Badge Dale, Stephen Root	
J A N U A R Y	29	Drag	Briarcliff Entertainment	Raviv Ullman, Greg Yagonlnitzer (directors/screenplay); Lizzy Caplan, Lucy DeVito, John Stamos, Christine Ko	
F E B R U A R Y	5	Ice Age: Boiling Point	20th Century Studios / 20th Century Animation	John C. Donkin (director); Ray Romano, Denis Leary, John Leguizamo, Simon Pegg, Queen Latifah	
F E B R U A R Y	5	Remain	Warner Bros. Pictures / Blinding Edge Pictures	M. Night Shyamalan (director/screenplay); Nicholas Sparks (screenplay); Jake Gyllenhaal, Phoebe Dynevor, Ashley Walters, Julie Hagerty, Jay O. Sanders	
F E B R U A R Y	5	The Comeback King	Universal Pictures / Apatow Productions	Judd Apatow (director/screenplay); Glen Powell (screenplay); Glen Powell, Cristin Milioti, Madelyn Cline, Stavros Halkias, Li Jin Hao, Vanessa Bayer, Tig Notaro, Kumail Nanjiani	
F E B R U A R Y	5	Karoshi	Lionsgate / 87Eleven Entertainment	Takashi Doscher (director/screenplay); Teo Yoo, Isabel May, Takehiro Hira, Bill Camp, Show Kasamatsu, Giancarlo Esposito, Cynthia Erivo	
F E B R U A R Y	5	Lice	Magenta Light Studios	Jonathan Bensimon (director); Anthony Musella, Shaun Harris (screenplay); Emile Hirsch, Justin Long, Kevin Connolly	
F E B R U A R Y	12	Narnia: The Magician's Nephew	Netflix / Pascal Pictures / Entertainment One	Greta Gerwig (director/screenplay); David McKenna, Beatrice Campbell, Emma Mackey, Carey Mulligan, Ciarán Hinds, Daniel Craig, Meryl Streep	
F E B R U A R Y	12	Wishful Thinking	Sony Pictures Classics / Pinky Promise	Graham Parkes (director/screenplay); Maya Hawke, Lewis Pullman, Randall Park, Jake Shane, Amrita Rao	
F E B R U A R Y	19	CoComelon: The Movie	Universal Pictures / DreamWorks Animation / Moonbug Entertainment / Prime Focus Studios	Kat Good (director); Adam Pava (screenplay); SZA, Connor Esterson, Ike Barinholtz, Nicholas Hoult, Rhys Darby, Cristo Fernández, Josh Johnson, Ego Nwodim, Matt Friend, Sarah Sherman	
F E B R U A R Y	19	Wife & Dog	Black Bear Pictures	Guy Ritchie (director/screenplay); Benedict Cumberbatch, Rosamund Pike, Anthony Hopkins, Cosmo Jarvis, James Norton, Paddy Considine, Pip Torrens	
F E B R U A R Y	26	The Revenge of La Llorona	Warner Bros. Pictures / New Line Cinema / Blumhouse Atomic	Santiago Menghini (director); Sean Tretta (screenplay); Monica Raymund, Jay Hernandez, Raymond Cruz, Edy Ganem	
F E B R U A R Y	26	K-Pop: The Debut	Paramount Pictures / Hybe America / Epic	Benson Lee (director); Eileen Shim (screenplay); Ji-young Yoo, Eric Nam, Tony Revolori	
F E B R U A R Y	26	Live Like That	Affirm Films	Dito Montiel (director/screenplay); Esai Morales, Roselyn Sanchez, Jesse Garcia, Richard Cabral	
M A R C H	5	Gatto	Walt Disney Pictures / Pixar Animation Studios	Enrico Casarosa (director/screenplay); Tripper Clancy, Andy Siara (screenplay); Mark Ruffalo, Laurence Fishburne, Enrico Casarosa, Bianca Babaşa, Sherry Cola, John Turturro, Rumen Sali Shopov, Rhys Darby, Isabella Rossellini	
M A R C H	5	The Thomas Crown Affair	Metro-Goldwyn-Mayer / Outlier Society / Atlas Entertainment	Michael B. Jordan (director); Drew Pearce (screenplay); Michael B. Jordan, Kenneth Branagh, Adria Arjona, Lily Gladstone, Danai Gurira, Pilou Asbæk	
M A R C H	12	The Exorcist: Martyrs	Universal Pictures / Blumhouse Atomic / Morgan Creek Entertainment	Mike Flanagan (director/screenplay); Scarlett Johansson, Chiwetel Ejiofor, Diane Lane, Jacobi Jupe, Sasha Calle, Scoot McNairy, Gil Bellows, Laurence Fishburne, John Leguizamo	
M A R C H	19	Sonic the Hedgehog 4	Paramount Pictures / Sega Sammy Group / Original Film	Jeff Fowler (director); Jim Carrey, Ben Schwartz, Kristen Bell, Colleen O'Shaughnessey, Idris Elba, Keanu Reeves, James Marsden, Tika Sumpter, Lee Majdoub, Ben Kingsley, Matt Berry, Nick Offerman, Richard Ayoade	
M A R C H	19	The Nightingale	TriStar Pictures / Lewellen Pictures / Hello Sunshine	Michael Morris (director); Dana Stevens, Ann Peacock (screenplay); Elle Fanning, Dakota Fanning, Edmund Donovan, Albrecht Schuch, Shira Haas, Mark Rylance	
M A R C H	26	Godzilla x Kong: Supernova	Warner Bros. Pictures / Legendary Pictures	Grant Sputore (director); David Callaham (screenplay); Kaitlyn Dever, Dan Stevens, Jack O'Connell, Alycia Debnam-Carey, Matthew Modine, Delroy Lindo, Sam Neill	
M A R C H	26	Day Drinker	Lionsgate / Thunder Road Films / Infinitum Nihil	Marc Webb (director); Zach Dean (screenplay); Johnny Depp, Madelyn Cline, Penélope Cruz	
M A R C H	26	The Saviors	Vertical	Kevin Hamedani (director/screenplay); Travis Betz (screenplay); Adam Scott, Danielle Deadwyler, Ron Perlman, Colleen Camp, Greg Kinnear	

== April–June ==
Opening		Title	Production company	Cast and crew	Ref.
A P R I L	2	The Surgeon	Sony Pictures / Thunder Road Films / Tango Entertainment	Roshan Sethi (director/screenplay); Michelle Yeoh, Martin Freeman, Laurie Davidson, Yuri Kolokolnikov, Joseph Mydell	
A P R I L	2	Play House	Focus Features / Divide/Conquer / Blumhouse Atomic	Nicolas Curcio (director/screenplay); Kirby Gladstein (screenplay); Will Harrison, Jessica Sula, Jordan Gonzalez, James Urbaniak	
A P R I L	9	Panic Carefully	Warner Bros Pictures / Esmail Corp / Red Om Films	Sam Esmail (director/screenplay); Julia Roberts, Elizabeth Olsen, Eddie Redmayne, Brian Tyree Henry, Joe Alwyn, Ben Chaplin, Aidan Gillen	
A P R I L	9	Boys for Life	Paramount Pictures / Paramount Primal	Tyler Falbo (director/screenplay); Max Barrett (screenplay)	
A P R I L	16	Not Alone	Universal Pictures / Illumination	Eric Guillon, Claire Dodgson, Jonathan Del Val (directors); Timothée Chalamet, Selena Gomez, Brett Goldstein, Rob Brydon, Diane Morgan, Jamie Demetriou, Allison Janney, Lamorne Morris	
A P R I L	16	Monitor	Searchlight Pictures / Temple Hill Entertainment	Matt Black, Ryan Polly (director/screenplay); Brittany O'Grady, Taz Skylar, Viveik Kalra	
A P R I L	16	Chasing Summer	Magenta Light Studios	Josephine Decker (director); Iliza Shlesinger (screenplay); Iliza Shlesinger, Tom Welling, Lola Tung, Garrett Wareing, Cassidy Freeman, Megan Mullally	
A P R I L	23	Spaceballs: The New One	Metro-Goldwyn-Mayer / Imagine Entertainment / Brooksfilms	Josh Greenbaum (director); Josh Gad, Mel Brooks, Benji Samit, Dan Hernandez (screenplay); Mel Brooks, Rick Moranis, Bill Pullman, Lewis Pullman, Keke Palmer, Daphne Zuniga, George Wyner, Josh Gad, Anthony Carrigan	
A P R I L	23	A Place in Hell	Neon / Republic Pictures / MRC / T-Street Productions	Chloe Domont (director/screenplay); Michelle Williams, Daisy Edgar-Jones, Andrew Scott, Danny Huston, Arturo Castro, Rob Yang, Kyle Mooney	
A P R I L	23	Family Movie	Variance Films / Dark Castle Entertainment	Kyra Sedgwick, Kevin Bacon (directors); Dan Beers (screenplay); Kevin Bacon, Kyra Sedgwick, Sosie Bacon, Travis Bacon, Liza Koshy, John Carroll Lynch, Jackie Earle Haley, Andrea Savage, Austin Amelio, Scoot McNairy	
A P R I L	30	The Legend of Zelda	Columbia Pictures / Nintendo / Arad Productions / OddBall Entertainment	Wes Ball (director); Derek Connolly, T. S. Nowlin (screenplay); Benjamin Evan Ainsworth, Bo Bragason, Uli Latukefu, Dichen Lachman, Yvonne Strahovski, Lydia Peckham, Sam Neill	
A P R I L	30	One Second After	Roadside Attractions / Moving Picture Institute	Scott Rogers (director); J. Michael Straczynski, Nicole Roewe (screenplay); Famke Janssen, Josh Holloway, Hannah John-Kamen, Mary McDonnell	
M A Y	6	The Resurrection of the Christ: Part One	Lionsgate / Icon Productions	Mel Gibson (director/screenplay); Randall Wallace (screenplay); Jaakko Ohtonen, Mariela Garriga, Pier Luigi Pasino, Kasia Smutniak, Riccardo Scamarcio, Rupert Everett	
M A Y	7	Beach Read	20th Century Studios / Original Film	Yulin Kuang (director/screenplay); Phoebe Dynevor, Patrick Schwarzenegger, Kristin Davis, Tig Notaro, Ella Balinska, Andie MacDowell, Kevin Bacon	
M A Y	7	Anything but Ghosts	Focus Features / Blumhouse Atomic / Spooky Pictures / Divide/Conquer	Curry Barker (director/screenplay); Cooper Tomlinson (screenplay); Cooper Tomlinson, Curry Barker, Violet McGraw, Chris Reinacher, Bryce Dallas Howard, Aaron Paul, Matthew Lillard	
M A Y	14	F.A.S.T.	Warner Bros. Pictures / Heyday Films	Ben Richardson (director); Taylor Sheridan (screenplay); Brandon Sklenar, Juliana Canfield, LaKeith Stanfield, Jason Clarke, Sam Claflin, Trevante Rhodes, Chloe Coleman	
M A Y	21	Bad Fairies	Warner Bros. Pictures / Warner Bros. Pictures Animation / Locksmith Animation	Megan Nicole Dong (director); Deborah Frances-White, Zoë Tomalin (screenplay); Cynthia Erivo, Ncuti Gatwa, Jonathan Groff, James Acaster, Serrana Su-Ling Bliss, Catherine Tate, Kylie Minogue	
M A Y	21	The Catch	Universal Pictures / 21 Laps Entertainment / Fruit Tree	Dave McCary (director); Patrick Kang, Michael Levin (screenplay); Emma Stone, Chris Pine, Ashley Padilla, Druski, Tim Robbins, Sissy Spacek	
M A Y	28	Star Wars: Starfighter	Lucasfilm / 21 Laps Entertainment	Shawn Levy (director); Jonathan Tropper (screenplay); Ryan Gosling, Flynn Gray, Matt Smith, Mia Goth, Aaron Pierre, Simon Bird, Jamael Westman, Daniel Ings, Amy Adams	
J U N E	4	John Rambo	Lionsgate / Millennium Media / AGBO	Jalmari Helander (director); Rory Haines and Sohrab Noshirvani (screenplay); Noah Centineo, David Harbour, Yao, James Franco	
J U N E	4	Skeletons	Columbia Pictures / Bad Robot / Infrared Pictures	JT Mollner (director); Brian Duffield (screenplay); Brie Larson, Kyle Gallner, Willa Fitzgerald, Ione Skye, Keith Carradine, John Goodman	
J U N E	11	How to Train Your Dragon 2	Universal Pictures / DreamWorks Animation / Marc Platt Productions	Dean DeBlois (director/screenplay); Mason Thames, Nico Parker, Nick Frost, Ólafur Darri Ólafsson, Phil Dunster, Cate Blanchett, Gerard Butler	
J U N E	11	Possession	Paramount Pictures / Vertigo Entertainment	Parker Finn (director/screenplay); Margaret Qualley, Callum Turner, Diego Calva, Paul Dano	
J U N E	18	Spider-Man: Beyond the Spider-Verse	Columbia Pictures / Sony Pictures Animation / Marvel Entertainment / Pascal Pictures / Lord Miller Productions / Arad Productions	Bob Persichetti, Justin K. Thompson (directors); Phil Lord and Christopher Miller, David Callaham (screenplay); Shameik Moore, Hailee Steinfeld, Brian Tyree Henry, Lauren Vélez, Jake Johnson, Jason Schwartzman, Karan Soni, John Mulaney, Kimiko Glenn, Daniel Kaluuya, Mahershala Ali, Nicolas Cage, Oscar Isaac	
J U N E	18	Untitled New Line Cinema film	New Line Cinema		
J U N E	25	Untitled Ocean's Eleven prequel	Warner Bros. Pictures / Alcon Entertainment / LuckyChap Entertainment / Everyman Pictures	Bradley Cooper (director/screenplay); Margot Robbie, Bradley Cooper, Wagner Moura, Monica Barbaro, Josh Gad, Vicky Krieps, George MacKay, Lauren Ridloff, Jack Holden, Omar Sy	
J U N E	25	The Hole	Orion Pictures	Kim Jee-woon (director); Christopher Chen (screenplay); Theo James, Jung Ho-yeon, Yeom Hye-ran, Christian Slater	
J U N E	30	Shrek 5	Universal Pictures / DreamWorks Animation	Walt Dohrn, Conrad Vernon (directors); Mike Myers, Eddie Murphy, Cameron Diaz, Zendaya, Skyler Gisondo, Marcello Hernández	

== July–September ==
Opening		Title	Production company	Cast and crew	Ref.
J U L Y	9	Man of Tomorrow	Warner Bros. Pictures / DC Studios / Troll Court Entertainment / The Safran Company	James Gunn (director/screenplay); David Corenswet, Nicholas Hoult, Rachel Brosnahan, Skyler Gisondo, Edi Gathegi, Nathan Fillion, Isabela Merced, Frank Grillo, Lars Eidinger, María Gabriela de Faría, Sara Sampaio, Aaron Pierre, Adria Arjona, Milly Alcock, Xolo Maridueña	
J U L Y	16	Crawl 2	Paramount Pictures	Alexandre Aja (director/screenplay); Jason Harry Pagan, Andrew Deutschman, Gregory Levasseur (screenplay); Mason Gooding, Emily Rudd	
J U L Y	16	Fake Skating	Columbia Pictures / Olive Bridge Entertainment	Josh Boone (director/screenplay); Victoria Bata, Morgan Lehmann (screenplay); Amélie Hoeferle, Graham Campbell, Bruce Greenwood, Johnny Knoxville	
J U L Y	23	A Minecraft Movie Squared	Warner Bros. Pictures / Legendary Pictures / Vertigo Entertainment / Mojang Studios	Jared Hess (director/screenplay); Chris Galletta (screenplay); Jason Momoa, Jack Black, Kirsten Dunst, Danielle Brooks, Matt Berry, Jennifer Coolidge	
J U L Y	30	A Quiet Place Part III	Paramount Pictures / Platinum Dunes / Sunday Night Productions	John Krasinski (director/screenplay); Emily Blunt, Cillian Murphy, Millicent Simmonds, Noah Jupe, Jack O'Connell, Katy O'Brian, Jason Clarke	
J U L Y	30	The Comebacker	Columbia Pictures / Playtone	Marielle Heller (director/screenplay); Tom Hanks, Callum Turner, Patricia Clarkson, Amy Madigan, Sterling K. Brown	
A U G U S T	6	Snoop	Universal Pictures / Imagine Entertainment / Death Row Pictures	Craig Brewer (director/screenplay); Joe Robert Cole (screenplay); Jonathan Daviss, Myles Bullock, Lauren London, Camron Jones, Algee Smith, Tre Hale, Jonica Booth, Cynthia Erivo, Aaron Paul, Giovanni Ribisi	
A U G U S T	6	Jason Statham Stole My Bike	Black Bear Pictures / 87North Productions	David Leitch (director); Alison Flierl (screenplay); Jason Statham, Hannah Waddingham, Eddie Peng, Daniel Ings	
A U G U S T	13	Untitled Teenage Mutant Ninja Turtles: Mutant Mayhem sequel	Paramount Pictures / Paramount Animation / Nickelodeon Movies / Point Grey Pictures	Jeff Rowe (director); Micah Abbey, Shamon Brown Jr., Nicolas Cantu, Brady Noon	
A U G U S T	13	Shiver	Warner Bros. Pictures / FilmNation Entertainment / Marv Studios	Tim Miller (director); Ian Shorr (screenplay); Keanu Reeves, Callie Cooke, Steven Waddington, Stefan Kapičić, Abraham Popoola	
A U G U S T	13	Jason	Cineverse	Steve Miner (director); David Fliegel (screenplay); Schuyler White, Natalie Alyn Lind, Matt Cornett, Lilia Buckingham, John Owen Lowe, Summer Madison, Selena Turner, Matthew Keoni Sato, Brook Sill, Guillermo Díaz, Johnell Young, Sencere Messiah Brown, Bryan Gael Guzman	
A U G U S T	13	Untitled Blumhouse Productions film	Universal Pictures / Blumhouse Productions		
A U G U S T	20	Narcs	Columbia Pictures	John Phillips (director/screenplay); Mason Thames, Ella Bright, Callan Farris, Lexi Minetree, Josh Macqueen	
A U G U S T	20	Get Lite	Paramount Pictures / Khalabo Ink Society	Teyana Taylor (director); Eric Gross (screenplay); Storm Reid, Ceyair Wright, Leslie Odom Jr., Aunjanue Ellis-Taylor, Woody McClain, Jodie Turner-Smith, Asante Blackk, Nia Long	
A U G U S T	27	Molepeople	Paramount Primal / Blumhouse Atomic	Ben Wheatley (director); Nathan Elston (screenplay); Ben Mendelsohn	
S E P T E M B E R	3	The New Simpsons Movie	20th Century Studios / 20th Century Animation / Gracie Films	Rob Oliver (director)	
S E P T E M B E R	10	The Conjuring: First Communion	Warner Bros. Pictures / New Line Cinema / The Safran Company	Rodrigue Huart (director); Richard Naing, Ian B. Goldberg (screenplay); Garrett Wareing, Amanda Fix, Matthias Schoenaerts, Charles Parnell	
S E P T E M B E R	24	Untitled DreamWorks Animation film	Universal Pictures / DreamWorks Animation		
S E P T E M B E R	24	Blair Witch Project	Lionsgate / Blumhouse Atomic	Dylan Clark (director); Chris Thomas Devlin (screenplay)	

== October–December ==
Opening		Title	Production company	Cast and crew	Ref.
O C T O B E R	1	The Great Beyond	Warner Bros. Pictures / Bad Robot	J. J. Abrams (director/screenplay); Glen Powell, Jenna Ortega, Emma Mackey, Sophie Okonedo, Merritt Wever, Samuel L. Jackson	
O C T O B E R	1	Untitled Christopher McQuarrie film	United Artists	Christopher McQuarrie (director); Scott Barkan, Gregg Zehentner (screenplay); Denzel Washington, Teyonah Parris, Miles Caton	
O C T O B E R	8	The Haunting of Hotel Transylvania	Columbia Pictures / Metro-Goldwyn-Mayer / Sony Pictures Animation	Jennifer Kluska, Alan Hawkins (directors)	
O C T O B E R	8	Sleepover	Universal Pictures / Blumhouse Atomic	Jacob Chase (director/screenplay); Bryce McGuire (screenplay); Michelle Monaghan, Justin Theroux	
O C T O B E R	15	The Mummy: Book of the Dead	Universal Pictures / Radio Silence Productions / Project X Entertainment	Matt Bettinelli-Olpin, Tyler Gillett (directors); David Coggeshall (screenplay); Brendan Fraser, Rachel Weisz, John Hannah, Arnold Vosloo, Oded Fehr, Kevin J. O'Connor, Michael Johnston, Numan Acar	
O C T O B E R	22	Paranormal Activity	Paramount Pictures / Blumhouse Atomic	Ian Tuason (director/screenplay); Chase Yi, Sonia Mena, Maya Da Costa	
N O V E M B E R	5	Naughty	Universal Pictures / LuckyChap Entertainment	Olivia Wilde (director); Jimmy Warden (screenplay); Jennifer Aniston, Peter Dinklage, Chase Sui Wonders, Regina Hall, Ike Barinholtz, Samara Weaving, Kate Berlant, John Early, Kate O'Flynn, Jamie Demetriou	
N O V E M B E R	5	Charlie vs. the Chocolate Factory	Netflix / Netflix Animation Studios	Jared Stern, Elaine Bogan (directors); Taika Waititi, Kit Connor, Nicola Coughlan, Charithra Chandran, Samson Kayo, Christopher Chung, Kate Winslet, Helena Bonham Carter	
N O V E M B E R	11	Treasure Island	Sony Pictures / Scott Free Productions	Ridley Scott (director); Jack Thorne (screenplay); Hugh Jackman	
N O V E M B E R	12	Margie Claus	Warner Bros. Pictures / Warner Bros. Pictures Animation / On the Day Productions	Kirk DeMicco (director); Ben Falcone, Damon Jones (screenplay); Melissa McCarthy, Cole Escola, Octavia Spencer, Maria Bakalova, Annie Mumolo, Cedric Yarbrough, Andrew Scott, Jim Gaffigan	
N O V E M B E R	12	Tomorrow, and Tomorrow, and Tomorrow	Paramount Pictures / Temple Hill Entertainment	Sian Heder (director/screenplay); Daisy Edgar-Jones, Sky Yang, Sean Kaufman	
N O V E M B E R	12	Seasons	Amazon MGM Studios / 21 Laps Entertainment / Blumhouse Atomic	Drew Hancock (director/screenplay); Lily James, Jack Reynor, Ron Perlman, Elizabeth McGovern, Wes Studi	
N O V E M B E R	19	Untitled Daniels film	Universal Pictures	Daniels (directors/screenplay); Matt Damon, Sandra Oh, Charles Melton, Sean Kaufman, Michael Gandolfini, PinkPantheress, John Leguizamo	
N O V E M B E R	19	The Families Stone	Searchlight Pictures / Groundswell Productions	Thomas Bezucha (directors/screenplay); Claire Danes, Rachel McAdams, Dermot Mulroney, Craig T. Nelson, Sarah Jessica Parker, Luke Wilson, Jean Smart	
N O V E M B E R	24	Frozen 3	Walt Disney Pictures / Walt Disney Animation Studios	Jennifer Lee (director/screenplay); Idina Menzel, Kristen Bell, Josh Gad, Jonathan Groff	
D E C E M B E R	10	24 Jump Street	Columbia Pictures / Original Film / Lord Miller Productions	Rodney Rothman (director/screenplay); Jonah Hill, Meghan Malloy (screenplay); Jonah Hill, Channing Tatum, Ice Cube	
D E C E M B E R	17	Avengers: Secret Wars	Marvel Studios / AGBO	Anthony and Joe Russo (directors); Stephen McFeely, Michael Waldron, Chris McKenna, Erik Sommers (screenplay); Robert Downey Jr., Chris Evans, Benedict Cumberbatch, Anthony Mackie, Hayley Atwell, Letitia Wright, Paul Bettany, Simu Liu, Pedro Pascal, Vanessa Kirby, Joseph Quinn, Ebon Moss-Bachrach, Sadie Sink, Ryan Gosling, Noah Jupe, Samuel L. Jackson	
D E C E M B E R	17	The Lord of the Rings: The Hunt for Gollum	Warner Bros. Pictures / New Line Cinema / WingNut Films / The Imaginarium Studios	Andy Serkis (director); Fran Walsh, Philippa Boyens, Phoebe Gittins, Arty Papageorgiou (screenplay); Andy Serkis, Ian McKellen, Kate Winslet, Jamie Dornan, Leo Woodall, Lee Pace, Elijah Wood, Anya Taylor-Joy	
D E C E M B E R	17	The Housemaid's Secret	Lionsgate / Mandeville Films	Paul Feig (director); Rebecca Sonnenshine (screenplay); Sydney Sweeney, Kirsten Dunst, Michele Morrone, Paul Anthony Kelly, Brittany Snow	
D E C E M B E R	22	Buds	Columbia Pictures / Sony Pictures Animation		
D E C E M B E R	25	Paris Paramount	Warner Bros. Pictures	Nancy Meyers (director/screenplay); Penélope Cruz, Kieran Culkin, Erin Doherty, Jude Law, Owen Wilson	
D E C E M B E R	25	Alone at Dawn	Amazon MGM Studios / Hideaway / Imagine Entertainment	Ron Howard (director); Michael Russell Gunn (screenplay); Adam Driver, Anne Hathaway, Betty Gilpin, Jon Bass, Rohan Campbell, Devon Bostick	
D E C E M B E R	25	Lizard Music	United Artists / Seven Bucks Productions	Benny Safdie (director/screenplay); Ronald Bronstein (screenplay); Dwayne Johnson, Theo Clark Leber, Tim Heidecker, Alicia Silverstone, Regina Hall, Andrew Dice Clay, Colman Domingo, Jeff Goldblum, Rachel McAdams, David Krumholtz, Raye	
