= 2027 in the United States =

- Decades: 2000s; 2010s; 2020s; 2030s
- See also: History of the United States (2016–present); Timeline of United States history (2010–present); List of years in the United States

The following is a list of planned or scheduled events of the year 2027 in the United States.

== Elections ==
=== Gubernatorial ===
Kentucky governor Andy Beshear cannot run for reelection after winning the 2023 election due to Kentucky term limit laws. Louisiana governor Jeff Landry is running for reelection. Mississippi governor Tate Reeves is ineligible to be reelected due to Mississippi's two-term limit.

=== Senate ===
There will likely be two Senate special elections held. In Minnesota, senator Amy Klobuchar is expected to resign from the Senate in 2027 after she successfully ran for state governor in 2026. Likewise, Tennessee senator Marsha Blackburn is expected to resign after her own gubernatorial election win that year. In both elections, candidates will run to serve out their predecessors' terms, which expire in 2030.

== Planned or scheduled events ==
- Launch of Artemis III

=== Sports ===
- Super Bowl LXI
- 2027 NFL draft
- 2026–27 NCAA Division I men's basketball season
- 2026–27 NCAA Division I women's basketball season
- 2027 NBA All-Star Game
- 2027 National Hockey League All-Star Game
- 2027 Major League Baseball season
- 2027 Sugar Bowl
- 2027 College Football Playoff National Championship

== See also ==
- 2027 in American music
- 2027 in American television
- List of American films of 2027
- 2027 NFL season
- 2027–28 United States network television schedule
- 2027–28 NBA season
- 2027–28 NHL season
- 2027–28 NCAA football bowl games
- 2027–28 NCAA Division I men's basketball season
- 2027–28 NCAA Division I women's basketball season
- 2027–28 Major League Soccer season
- 2027–28 Orlando Magic season
- 2027–28 Los Angeles Lakers season
- 2027–28 Los Angeles Clippers season
- 2027–28 Phoenix Suns season
- 2027–28 New York Knicks season
- 2027–28 Miami Heat season
- 2027–28 Chicago Bulls season
- 2027–28 Houston Rockets season
- 2027–28 San Antonio Spurs season
- 2027–28 Oklahoma City Thunder season
