= Scared to Death =

Scared to Death may refer to:

- Voodoo death, literally dying of fright or other emotional response
- Scared to Death (1947 film), a horror film starring Béla Lugosi
- Scared to Death (1980 film), a horror/science fiction film directed by William Malone
- Scared to Death (2024 film), horror comedy film by Paul Boyd
- "Scared to Death" (Criminal Minds), a 2007 television episode
- "Scared to Death", a 2012 song by HIM from Screamworks: Love in Theory and Practice
- Scared to Death, a podcast by Dan Cummins
