= Jermaine Fowler =

American actor

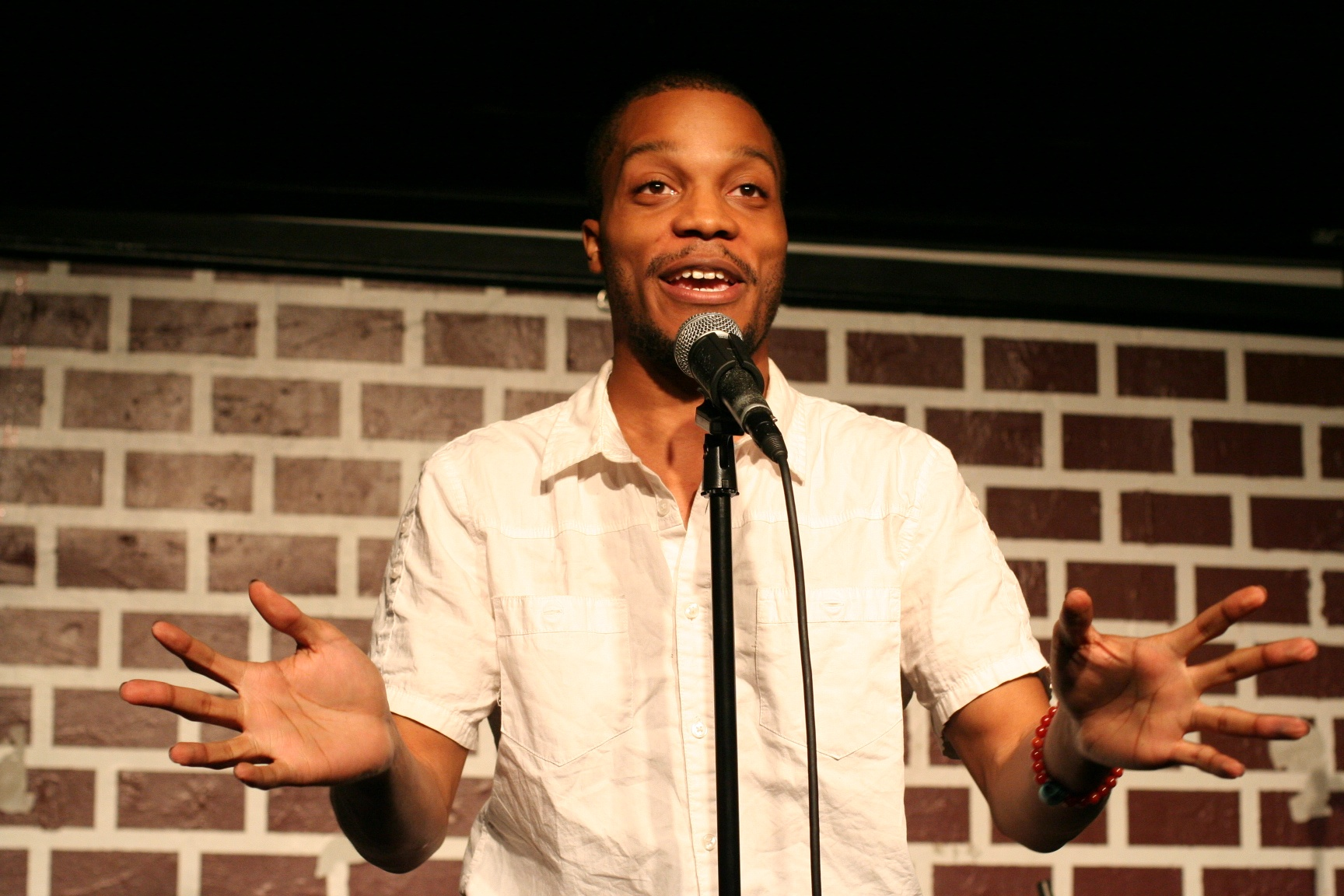
- Fowler performing standup comedy in 2011
- Born: May 16, 1988 (age 38); Washington, D.C., U.S.
- Education: Northwestern High School
- Occupations: Actor; comedian; producer; writer
- Years active: 2012–present
- Website: Official website

Jermaine Fowler (born May 16, 1988) is an American actor, comedian, producer and writer. He is perhaps best known for his roles as King Akeem Joffer's long-lost son Prince Lavelle Junson in the 2021 romantic comedy film Coming 2 America and Franco Wicks on the CBS sitcom television series Superior Donuts.

== Early life ==
The second oldest of four children, Fowler and his twin brother were born in Washington, D.C., and raised in Hyattsville, Maryland, where he graduated from Northwestern High School. Fowler dropped out of college at age 20 and moved to New York City. By day he job-searched and by night he performed at open mics in Times Square.

== Career ==
=== 2012–2015: Stand-up comedy ===
In 2012, he began touring the country performing at comedy clubs and colleges. In 2013, he was cast in MTV2's Guy Code and writing, producing, and starring in his own pilots. In 2014, he starred in Friends of the People which lasted two seasons on TruTV. In 2015, Fowler produced and starred in his debut comedy special Give 'Em Hell, Kid, which he licensed to Showtime.

=== 2017–present: Superior Donuts and Crutch ===
In 2017, Fowler became an executive producer and star of the CBS sitcom Superior Donuts. The show was renewed for a second season on March 23, 2017, but was cancelled after two seasons. He also had a recurring role on HBO's Crashing.

On September 17, 2017, Fowler was the announcer of the 69th Annual Primetime Emmy Awards.

Fowler starred alongside Tracy Morgan in Crutch, which is about a Harlem widower whose empty nest plans get disrupted when his millennial son and free-spirited daughter move back in, forcing him to navigate new family dynamics and redefine his priorities. Fowler plays Jake Crutchfield, who is a newly graduated lawyer from Columbia Law. He had a job offer at a big law firm but decided to forgo that to work pro bono as a legal aid attorney.

== Filmography ==
=== Film ===
- Sorry to Bother You (2018) as Salvador
- Buffaloed (2019) as Graham
- The Opening Act (2020) as Ricky
- Judas and the Black Messiah (2021) as Mark Clark
- Coming 2 America (2021) as Lavelle Junson
- Riverdance: The Animated Adventure (2021) as Benny (voice)
- Am I OK? (2022) as Danny
- The Drop (2022) as Mani
- The Blackening (2022) as Clifton
- Late Bloomers (2023) as Brick
- First Time Female Director (2023) as Reginald
- Ricky Stanicky (2024) as Wes
- Sting (2024) as Frank
- Don't Tell Mom the Babysitter's Dead (2024) as Gus
- Terrestrial (2025) as Allen
- Eenie Meanie (2025) as The Chaperone
- Appofeniacs (2025) as Cedrick
- Night Patrol (2025) as Xavier Carr
- Faces of Death (2026) as Josh

=== Television ===
- Guy Code (2012) as Himself
- The Eric Andre Show (2012) as Principal
- Funny or Die Presents (2013)
- Lucas Bros. Moving Co. (2014–2015) as Eddie Murphy / Jaleel White (voice)
- BoJack Horseman (2014–2019) as Pete Repeat (voice)
- Comedy Underground with Dave Attell (2014) as Himself
- Friends of the People (2014) as Various
- Delores and Jermaine (2015) as Jermaine
- Robot Chicken (2015) as Billy / Midnight Society Member (voice)
- Give 'Em Hell, Kid (2016, standup comedy show) as Himself
- Morris and the Cow (2016) as Morris (voice)
- Crashing (2017–2019) as Russell
- Family Guy (2017) as Kid (voice)
- Lip Sync Battle (2017) as Himself
- Superior Donuts (2017–2018) as Franco Wicks
- RuPaul's Secret Celebrity Drag Race (2020) as Himself
- Match Game (2020) as Himself
- RuPaul's Drag Race: All Stars 6 (2021) as Himself
- Tuca & Bertie (2022) as Bird Town Tour Guide (voice)
- Moon Girl and Devil Dinosaur (2023–2025) as James Lafayette Jr. (voice)
- A Murder at the End of the World (2023) as Martin Mitchell
- Princess Power (2023–2024) as Sir Kaue / Royal Attendant (voice)
- Only Murders in the Building (2025) as Randall
- Crutch (2025) as Jake Crutchfield
- Barbershop (2027) as Travis "Trav" Porter
