= Twilight of the Dead (film) =

Upcoming horror film

- Directed by: Doron Paz; Yoav Paz
- Written by: George A. Romero (Note: posthumous credit); Paolo Zelati; Joe Knetter
- Produced by: John Baldecchi; Sarah Donnelly; Suzanne Romero; Robert L. Lucas
- Starring: Kate Beckinsale; Betty Gabriel; Abigail London; John D. Hickman
- Production companies: Roundtable Entertainment; SSS Entertainment; Aanaxion
- Distributed by: Magenta Light Studios
- Release date: 2027
- Countries: United States; South Korea
- Language: English

Twilight of the Dead is an upcoming horror zombie film directed by Doron Paz and Yoav Paz, collectively known as the Paz Brothers. The project was originally conceived by filmmaker George A. Romero as the seventh and final instalment of his Night of the Living Dead film series, following the continuity of Night of the Living Dead (1968), Dawn of the Dead (1978), Day of the Dead (1985) and Land of the Dead (2005), based on a story Romero co-developed with screenwriter Paolo Zelati before Romero's death in 2017. The project was revived in 2021 by Romero's widow, Suzanne Desrocher-Romero, who oversaw the completion of the screenplay with Zelati and screenwriters Joe Knetter and Robert L. Lucas. Desrocher-Romero remained closely involved in the film's development and production until her death in June 2026.

Set on an island in a post-apocalyptic world overrun by the undead, the film stars Kate Beckinsale as a woman with a child struggling to survive among the last remaining humans on Earth. The cast also includes Betty Gabriel, Abigail London, Kurt Deimer, Phil Burke, Cooper Barnes, Tait Fletcher and John D. Hickman.

Twilight of the Dead is scheduled to be released theatrically in the United States in 2027 by Magenta Light Studios.

== Premise ==
Set on a tropical island, the film dives "into the dark nature of humanity from the perspective of the last humans on Earth who are caught between factions of the undead".

== Cast ==
- Kate Beckinsale
- Betty Gabriel
- Abigail London
- Kurt Deimer
- Phil Burke
- Cooper Barnes
- Tait Fletcher
- John D. Hickman

== Production ==
=== Development ===
Following the release of Diary of the Dead (2007) and Survival of the Dead (2009), Twilight of the Dead was conceived by George A. Romero as the concluding installment to his Living Dead zombie film series. Romero did not regard Diary and Survival as part of the overarching narrative from Night of the Living Dead (1968), Dawn of the Dead (1978), Day of the Dead (1985) and Land of the Dead (2005), and saw the fate of the zombies following Land of the Dead as an unresolved narrative element. In 2009, around the time of the release of Survival of the Dead, Romero told Movies.com that he was considering a potential sequel with a "noir flavor", or a jungle adventure with people traveling down the Amazon River, intending the film to be the final chapter to his Night of the Living Dead series series, and completing the storyline left off from Land of the Dead. Romero co-wrote a film treatment for the film with screenwriter Paolo Zelati, and they had started working on the script together, which was to be set on a tropical island in a decimated world where life has all but disappeared, and follow the last humans on Earth who are caught between factions of the undead, but Romero died from lung cancer in 2017. Zelati approached Romero's widow, Suzanne Desrocher-Romero, to get permission to complete the script.

In 2021, Romero's widow Suzanne Romero announced revived the project and oversaw the completion of the screenplay, with screenwriters Joe Knetter and Robert L. Lucas joining Zelati to finish the script, which would follow a woman and child who are the last human survivors as they search for safety on a once idyllic island now overtaken by nature and the undead. The writers watched archive videos of George A. Romero coming up with the original treatment as reference when creating the script. Suzanne Romero remained closely involved throughout the development process to ensure the film aligned with her late husband's vision, and sought to maintain the social commentary elements his previous Living Dead films were known for. Suzanne told The Hollywood Reporter, "This is the film he wanted to make. And while someone else will carry the torch as the director, it is very much a George A. Romero film."

In April 2021, Desrocher-Romero announced that she was shopping the script, seeking a director for the project. The Machinist (2004) director Brad Anderson joined the project as director in September 2023, describing Romero's original films as a major influence on his work and expressing a desire for Twilight of the Dead to continue the series' blend of horror with social commentary and humanistic themes. Anderson was previously attached to direct the 2010 remake of Romero's The Crazies (1973). Twilight of the Dead is produced by Suzanne Romero, John Baldecchi, Sarah Donnelly, Paolo Zelati, and Stephanie Caleb of Ardvella Entertainment. Executive producers include Dominic Ianno, Alex Dundas, Jason Resnick, Chris Roe, and Luis Riefkohl.

In November 2024, Betty Gabriel and Milla Jovovich were announced as the film's lead cast members. Frequent Romero collaborators Greg Nicotero and his KNB EFX Group, whose careers began with Romero's Day of the Dead (1985), were also announced as the leads of the film's prosthetic makeup effects team. The screenplay had been completed by the end of 2023, and in August of that year, the George A. Romero estate partnered with Los Angeles-based financier-producer Roundtable Entertainment, which joined the project as a production company and financier. Production was initially scheduled to begin in Puerto Rico in late 2023, but was delayed by the 2023 SAG-AFTRA strike. The production was subsequently granted an interim agreement permitting casting activities to take place before the strike ended. Filming was later rescheduled to begin in Puerto Rico on March 6, 2025, with production expected to wrap in April. Fortitude International launched international sales for Twilight of the Dead at the American Film Market, partnering with Roundtable Entertainment to secure worldwide distribution for the film. In October 2025, Nicotero stated that the film was seeking additional financing and would depict a further evolution of the zombies. In May 2026, Kate Beckinsale was cast in the lead role, replacing Jovovich. Doron and Yoav Paz were appointed as the new directors, while Magenta Light Studios acquired the film's distribution rights. In June 2026, it was confirmed that Nicotero would lead the film's visual effects team. Later that month, producer Suzanne Desrocher-Romero died of natural causes. By September 2026, Abigail London, Kurt Deimer, Phil Burke, Cooper Barnes, Tait Fletcher and John D. Hickman had joined the cast.

=== Filming ===
Principal photography occurred in September 2026, in Kentucky, and wrapped by October 2. The production faced a union protest staged by Teamsters Local 89 based in Louisville that caused some altercations in Bon Ayr. The union claimed the picket as a success after crew van drivers were not receiving union benefits and not properly compensated for their work. Ultimately a new contract with TotD LLC was established by the end of the day after approximately 7 hours under picket. Filming also took place in Glasgow, Kentucky. Filming also took place in Barren County, Kentucky, enabling the production to claim a tax credit of $3,838,918 through the Kentucky Entertainment Incentive programme. In October 2026, filming officially wrapped.

== Release ==
Twilight of the Dead is set to be theatrically released in the United States by Magenta Light Studios in 2027.
