= 2027 Major League Soccer season =

32nd season of Major League Soccer

Major League Soccer
- Season: 2027
- Dates: February 19 – May 8 (regular season); May (playoffs)
- Teams: 30

The 2027 Major League Soccer season, also known as the Sprint Season, is the upcoming 32nd season of Major League Soccer (MLS), the top professional soccer league in the United States and Canada. It is also the 49th overall season of a national first-division men's soccer league in the United States overseen by the United States Soccer Federation. The league has 30 clubs that are divided into the Eastern and Western conferences, each with 15 teams.

In anticipation of the schedule-flipped 2027–28 Major League Soccer season, the 2027 MLS season will use an abbreviated schedule, where teams only play fourteen matches each, and only against intra-conference opponents.

All MLS matches during the regular season and playoffs are planned to be broadcast on Apple TV, an online streaming service operated by Apple Inc.

== Background ==
When MLS began play in 1996, they elected to follow a spring–fall schedule to avoid conflicts with the National Football League (NFL); in 1996, every MLS team played in NFL or college football stadiums. (Note: As of 2026, 20 of the 30 MLS teams play in soccer-specific stadiums.) In late 2025, MLS owners voted to shift the MLS calendar away from the schedule they had adopted since the league began in 1996 to a summer–spring calendar to align with the top European soccer leagues. The shift was made to help MLS teams align with global transfer windows, avoid international breaks, and hold playoffs without calendar interruptions. MLS started surveying fans and owners in 2024 to gauge interest in the calendar shift, and on a vote by MLS ownership on November 13, 2025, they officially approved the calendar change.

== Format ==
On March 19, 2026, MLS announced that the 2027 season would be a shortened "sprint" league from February to May 2027. During the shortened season, each team will play fourteen regular season games, down from the usual thirty-four, culminating in the 2027 MLS Cup playoffs and MLS Cup in May. Teams will play only other teams within their own conference, splitting those matches with each team playing seven games at home and seven away. The top eight teams from each conference will qualify for the playoffs. Results from the regular season, playoffs and MLS Cup will determine qualification for the 2028 U.S. Open Cup, Leagues Cup and CONCACAF Champions Cup.

The regular season will begin on February 19 and run through May 8. Playoffs will be a single-elimination bracket with sixteen teams and culminate in MLS Cup 2027 on Memorial Day weekend (i.e. May 29–31).

== Teams ==
=== Stadiums and locations ===
In February 2026, New York City FC announced that the official opening of Etihad Park would be delayed until the 2027–28 season in the wake of MLS's decision to switch to a fall-to-spring schedule, clarifying that the club would continue play at Yankee Stadium and Citi Field during the shortened 2027 season.

Locations of teams for the 2027 Major League Soccer season
Western Conference Eastern Conference

Team	Stadium	Capacity
Atlanta United FC	Mercedes-Benz Stadium	42,500
Austin FC	Q2 Stadium	20,738
CF Montréal	Saputo Stadium	19,619
Charlotte FC	Bank of America Stadium	38,000
Chicago Fire FC	Soldier Field	24,955
Colorado Rapids	Dick's Sporting Goods Park	18,061
Columbus Crew	ScottsMiracle-Gro Field	20,011
D.C. United	Audi Field	20,000
FC Cincinnati	TQL Stadium	26,000
FC Dallas	Toyota Stadium	20,500
Houston Dynamo FC	Shell Energy Stadium	22,039
Inter Miami CF	Nu Stadium	26,700
LA Galaxy	Dignity Health Sports Park	27,000
Los Angeles FC	BMO Stadium	22,000
Minnesota United FC	Allianz Field	19,400
Nashville SC	Geodis Park	30,000
New England Revolution	Gillette Stadium	20,000
New York City FC	Yankee Stadium Citi Field	28,743 41,992
New York Red Bulls	Sports Illustrated Stadium	25,000
Orlando City SC	Inter.co Stadium	25,500
Philadelphia Union	Subaru Park	18,500
Portland Timbers	Providence Park	25,218
Real Salt Lake	America First Field	20,213
San Diego FC	Snapdragon Stadium	35,000
San Jose Earthquakes	PayPal Park	18,000
Seattle Sounders FC	Lumen Field	37,722
Sporting Kansas City	Sporting Park	18,467
St. Louis City SC	Energizer Park	22,423
Toronto FC	BMO Field	28,351
Vancouver Whitecaps FC	BC Place	22,120

1. Non-soccer specific stadium and artificially reduced capacity. Capacity may be increased to full capacity if demand requires.

=== Coaching changes ===
Team	Outgoing coach	Manner of departure	Date of vacancy	Position in table	Incoming coach	Date of appointment
Austin FC	(United States) Davy Arnaud (interim)	End of interim period	November 7, 2026	Pre-season	(United States) Jim Curtin	December 1, 2026 (Note: Announcement was made originally on June 8, 2026)
New York City FC	(Netherlands) Pascal Jansen	Fired	November 8, 2026	Pre-season		
Sporting Kansas City	(Switzerland) Raphaël Wicky	Fired	November 9, 2026	Pre-season		
Toronto FC	(United States) Robin Fraser	Fired	November 9, 2026	Pre-season		
D.C. United	(Switzerland) René Weiler	Fired	November 14, 2026	Pre-season	(Colombia) Óscar Pareja	November 14, 2026

== Regular season ==
=== Conference standings ===
MLS Eastern Conference table (2027)
Pos	Team	Pld	W	L	T	GF	GA	GD	Pts	Qualification
1	Atlanta United FC	0	0	0	0	0	0	0	0	Qualification for playoffs and the CONCACAF Champions Cup round one
2	Chicago Fire FC	0	0	0	0	0	0	0	0	Qualification for playoffs
3	FC Cincinnati	0	0	0	0	0	0	0	0	Qualification for playoffs
4	Columbus Crew	0	0	0	0	0	0	0	0	Qualification for playoffs
5	Charlotte FC	0	0	0	0	0	0	0	0	Qualification for playoffs
6	D.C. United	0	0	0	0	0	0	0	0	Qualification for playoffs
7	Inter Miami CF	0	0	0	0	0	0	0	0	Qualification for playoffs
8	CF Montréal	0	0	0	0	0	0	0	0	Qualification for playoffs
9	Nashville SC	0	0	0	0	0	0	0	0	
10	New England Revolution	0	0	0	0	0	0	0	0	
11	New York City FC	0	0	0	0	0	0	0	0	
12	New York Red Bulls	0	0	0	0	0	0	0	0	
13	Orlando City SC	0	0	0	0	0	0	0	0	
14	Philadelphia Union	0	0	0	0	0	0	0	0	
15	Toronto FC	0	0	0	0	0	0	0	0	

First match(es) will be played: February 19, 2027. Source: MLS
Rules for classification: 1) points; 2) total wins; 3) total goal differential; 4) total goals scored; 5) fewer disciplinary points; 6) away goal differential; 7) away goals scored; 8) home goals differential; 9) home goals scored; 10) coin toss (2 clubs tied) or drawing of lots (≥3 clubs tied)

MLS Western Conference table (2027)
Pos	Team	Pld	W	L	T	GF	GA	GD	Pts	Qualification
1	Austin FC	0	0	0	0	0	0	0	0	Qualification for playoffs and the CONCACAF Champions Cup round one
2	Colorado Rapids	0	0	0	0	0	0	0	0	Qualification for playoffs
3	FC Dallas	0	0	0	0	0	0	0	0	Qualification for playoffs
4	Houston Dynamo FC	0	0	0	0	0	0	0	0	Qualification for playoffs
5	LA Galaxy	0	0	0	0	0	0	0	0	Qualification for playoffs
6	Los Angeles FC	0	0	0	0	0	0	0	0	Qualification for playoffs
7	Minnesota United FC	0	0	0	0	0	0	0	0	Qualification for playoffs
8	Portland Timbers	0	0	0	0	0	0	0	0	Qualification for playoffs
9	Real Salt Lake	0	0	0	0	0	0	0	0	
10	San Diego FC	0	0	0	0	0	0	0	0	
11	San Jose Earthquakes	0	0	0	0	0	0	0	0	
12	Seattle Sounders FC	0	0	0	0	0	0	0	0	
13	Sporting Kansas City	0	0	0	0	0	0	0	0	
14	St. Louis City SC	0	0	0	0	0	0	0	0	
15	Vancouver Whitecaps FC	0	0	0	0	0	0	0	0	

First match(es) will be played: February 19, 2027. Source: MLS
Rules for classification: 1) points; 2) total wins; 3) total goal differential; 4) total goals scored; 5) fewer disciplinary points; 6) away goal differential; 7) away goals scored; 8) home goals differential; 9) home goals scored; 10) coin toss (2 clubs tied) or drawing of lots (≥3 clubs tied)

=== Overall table ===
The leading team in this table wins the Supporters' Shield.

Overall MLS standings table
Pos	Team	Pld	W	L	T	GF	GA	GD	Pts
1	Atlanta United FC	0	0	0	0	0	0	0	0
2	Austin FC	0	0	0	0	0	0	0	0
3	Chicago Fire FC	0	0	0	0	0	0	0	0
4	FC Cincinnati	0	0	0	0	0	0	0	0
5	Charlotte FC	0	0	0	0	0	0	0	0
6	Columbus Crew	0	0	0	0	0	0	0	0
7	Colorado Rapids	0	0	0	0	0	0	0	0
8	FC Dallas	0	0	0	0	0	0	0	0
9	D.C. United	0	0	0	0	0	0	0	0
10	Houston Dynamo FC	0	0	0	0	0	0	0	0
11	LA Galaxy	0	0	0	0	0	0	0	0
12	Los Angeles FC	0	0	0	0	0	0	0	0
13	Inter Miami CF	0	0	0	0	0	0	0	0
14	Minnesota United FC	0	0	0	0	0	0	0	0
15	CF Montréal	0	0	0	0	0	0	0	0
16	Nashville SC	0	0	0	0	0	0	0	0
17	New England Revolution	0	0	0	0	0	0	0	0
18	New York City FC	0	0	0	0	0	0	0	0
19	New York Red Bulls	0	0	0	0	0	0	0	0
20	Orlando City SC	0	0	0	0	0	0	0	0
21	Philadelphia Union	0	0	0	0	0	0	0	0
22	Portland Timbers	0	0	0	0	0	0	0	0
23	Real Salt Lake	0	0	0	0	0	0	0	0
24	San Diego FC	0	0	0	0	0	0	0	0
25	San Jose Earthquakes	0	0	0	0	0	0	0	0
26	Seattle Sounders FC	0	0	0	0	0	0	0	0
27	St. Louis City SC	0	0	0	0	0	0	0	0
28	Sporting Kansas City	0	0	0	0	0	0	0	0
29	Toronto FC	0	0	0	0	0	0	0	0
30	Vancouver Whitecaps FC	0	0	0	0	0	0	0	0

First match(es) will be played: February 19, 2027. Source: MLS
Rules for classification: 1) points; 2) total wins; 3) total goal differential; 4) total goals scored; 5) fewer disciplinary points; 6) away goal differential; 7) away goals scored; 8) home goals differential; 9) home goals scored; 10) coin toss (2 clubs tied) or drawing of lots (≥3 clubs tied)
