= Kurt Deimer =

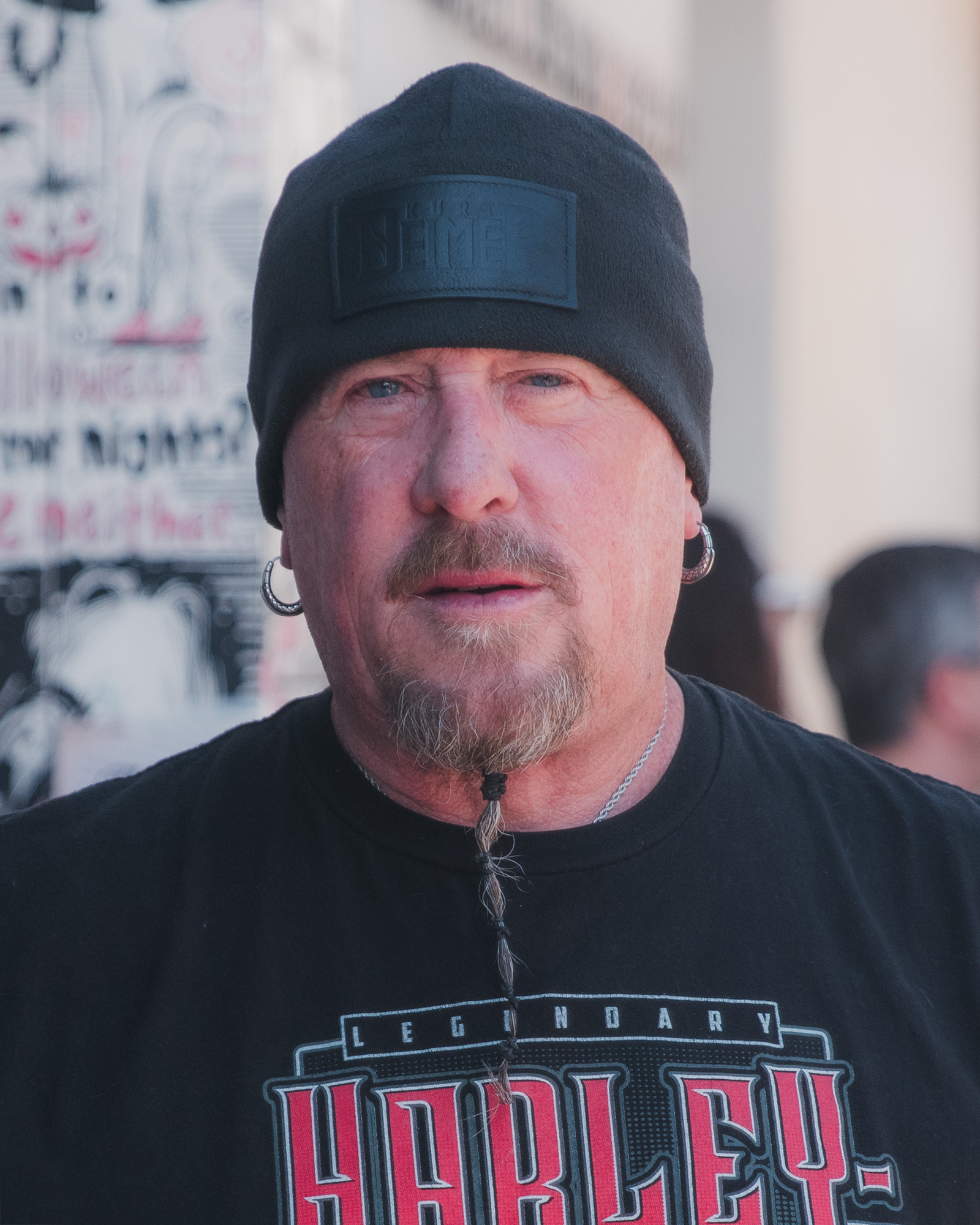
- Deimer in 2026

Background information
- Origin: Cincinnati, OH
- Occupations: Actor, Musician, Singer-Songwriter
- Years active: 2017-present
- Website: http://kurtdeimer.com

Kurt Deimer (kɜrt daɪ-mɜr) is an actor, musician, and rock singer-songwriter from Cincinnati, OH. He is known for his horror film roles, including in the 2018 remake of Halloween and the horror films Scared to Death and Hellbilly Hollow, and for his rock music releases featuring collaborations with artists and producers including Phil X of Bon Jovi, Geoff Tate of Queensrÿche, Josh Todd of Buckcherry, and mix engineer and producer Chris Lord-Alge.

== Career ==
Kurt Deimer (born April 25, 1966) studied piano, viola, guitar and percussion as a child. Entrepreneurial from a young age, he started his first business at age 13. Deimer played in bands while in high school and college, but before becoming a professional musician and actor, he built an oil business called Starfire.

=== Film career ===
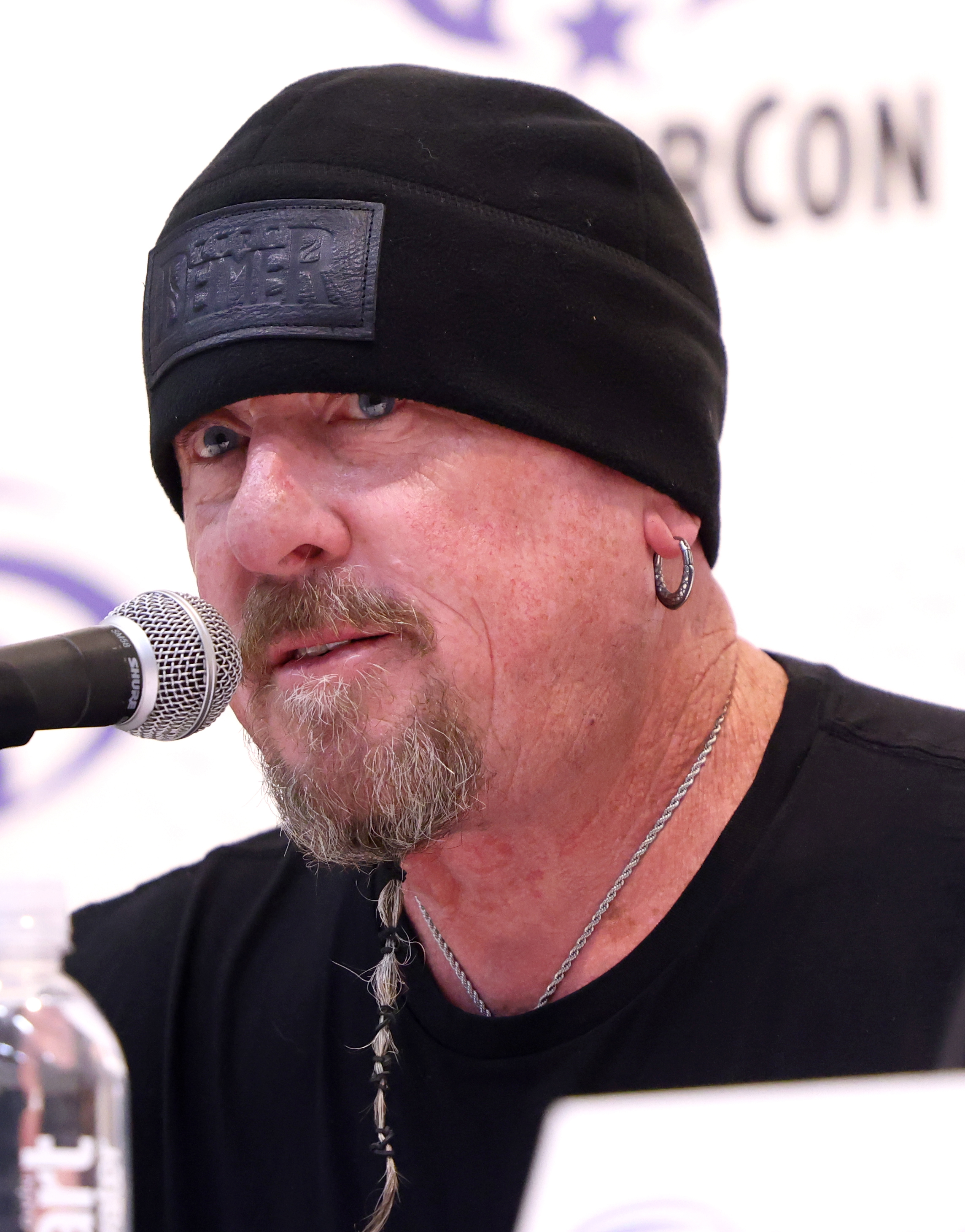
Deimer at the 2026 WonderCon, promoting Scared to Death

In 2017, Deimer secured a visual feature for his company Starfire's signage in a movie later titled Trading Paint. The film was being shot in Alabama, and Deimer was offered a cameo role. Upon arrival, he was offered a speaking part as a track announcer in a scene opposite Toby Sebastian, John Travolta and Shania Twain. The film was released in 2019, with Deimer in the role of "Trackman Bob."

In 2018, before the release of Trading Paint, Deimer was cast in the horror film Halloween (the 2018 remake) in which his character was killed by Michael Myers.

Deimer executive-produced, wrote three songs for, and starred as "The Grog" alongside Lin Shaye and Bill Moseley in the 2024 horror comedy Scared to Death. The film premiered at the Popcorn Frights Horror Film Festival on August 11, 2024 and had a limited theatrical release in 2026.

In 2022 he co-produced, starred in, and contributed rock and roll songs for Hellbilly Hollow, directed by Kevin Wayne. Deimer and Wayne played twisted brothers who run a haunted attraction involving "real murders and mayhem." It screened at the 20th New York City Horror Film Festival in 2022. Through Atlas Distribution Company, it had a September 25, 2026 theatrical release. The soundtrack includes many songs by Deimer, who also co-produced the film with his company Bald Man Films.

=== Music career ===
Deimer's music career got a boost when he connected with Andy Gould, who managed him from 2021 to 2023. The led to a meeting with mixer and producer Chris Lord-Alge, who offered to mix his demos, and that collaboration led to Deimer's connection with Phil X (Bon Jovi), with whom he collaborated on his debut EP Work Hard, Rock Hard in 2022. The EP also features Geoff Tate (Queensrÿche), with whom Deimer toured in 2021, and was produced by Lord-Alge. Paul Boyd directed the video for the song "Naive."

In fall 2022 Deimer opened for Tesla on a string of shows. He toured supporting Skid Row and Buckcherry in 2023. and toured with Sebastian Bach in the fall of 2024.

In 2025 Deimer released his debut double album And So It Begins..., with Phil X as a co-writer and guitarist and Chris Lord-Alge again producing. Geoff Tate appeared on the single "Burn Together."

In October Deimer and Josh Todd of Buckcherry released the single "In Deep," which hit the Top 40 on the Billboard Mainstream Rock chart, and the two followed it up in January 2026 with an acoustic version. In 2025 Deimer toured with Sebastian Bach, Buckcherry, and Steel Panther.

On May 8, 2026 Deimer released his second full-length album, A Grog in Born, on his own label, Bald Man Records. The single was a reinvented version of Queensrÿche's "Silent Lucidity" that featured Geoff Tate. His touring in 2026 included appearances with Halestorm and Ted Nugent.

Many original songs by Deimer appeared on the soundtrack of the film Hellbilly Hollow, which Deimer also co-produced and starred in.

=== Personal and family life ===
Deimer currently lives in Ohio and has three children.

== Discography ==
=== Albums and EPs ===
Year	Album
2021	Work Hard, Rock Hard (EP)
2025	And So It Begins... (LP)
2026	A Grog Is Born (LP)

=== Singles ===
Year	Title	Album	US Mainstream Rock
2021	"Have a Cigar"	And So It Begins...	—
2021	"Burn Together" feat. Geoff Tate	Work Hard, Rock Hard and And So It Begins...	—
2022	"Hero"	And So It Begins...	—
2022	"My Dad"	And So It Begins...	—
2024	"Dance"	And So It Begins...	—
2024	"Doom"	And So It Begins...	—
2024	"Fight"	And So It Begins...	—
2025	"Live or Die"	And So It Begins...	—
2025	"Big Toe"	And So It Begins...	—
2025	"Sunset Boulevard"	And So It Begins...	—
2025	"In Deep" feat. Josh Todd	A Grog Is Born	39
2026	"In Deep" (acoustic) feat. Josh Todd	Non-album single	—
2026	"Scared to Death"	A Grog Is Born	—
2026	"Always There"	A Grog Is Born	—
2026	"Silent Lucidity"	A Grog Is Born	—

== Filmography ==
Year	Movie	Role
2018	Halloween	Teller
2019	Trading Paint	Trackman Bob
2024	Scared to Death	The Grog
2026	Hellbilly Hollow	Bull
2027	Twilight of the Dead †	
