= Appofeniacs =

2025 film by Chris Marrs Piliero

- Directed by: Chris Marrs Piliero
- Written by: Chris Marrs Piliero
- Produced by: Jared Iacino; Andrew Panay; Chris Marrs Piliero
- Starring: Aaron Holliday; Jermaine Fowler; Sean Gunn
- Cinematography: Adam Leene
- Music by: Mike Riley; Rob Spence
- Production companies: Magenta Light Studios; Odin's Eye Entertainment
- Distributed by: Magenta Edge Films
- Release dates: August 22, 2025 (FrightFest); October 2, 2026 (United States)
- Running time: 89 minutes
- Country: United States
- Language: English
- Budget: $300,000
- Box office: $34,572

Appofeniacs is a 2025 horror thriller film written and directed by Chris Marrs Piliero about the use of AI technology that expresses itself in the most violently fatal form after a series of deepfake videos are unleashed causing a slew of mortalities.

The film premiered at FrightFest on August 22, 2025. It also released in the United States by Magenta Edge Films on October 2, 2026.

== Cast ==
- Aaron Holliday as Duke
- Jermaine Fowler as Cedrick
- Sean Gunn as Clinto Binto
- Michael Abbott Jr. as Banks
- Will Brandt as Texas Tim
- Paige Searcy as Lazzy
- Simran Jehani as Poppy
- Harley Bronwyn as Evie
- Kellan Rhude as Aiden

== Production ==
in February 2025, it was announced that Appofeniacs had wrapped filming with Chris Marrs Piliero directing, producing, and writing the film with Aaron Holiday, Jermaine Fowler, Michael Abbott Jr. and Sean Gunn confirmed to star.

== Release ==
Appofeniacs premiered on FrightFest on August 22, 2025. It also released in the United States on October 2, 2026 by Magenta Edge Films.
