= Magenta Light Studios =

American independent motion picture company

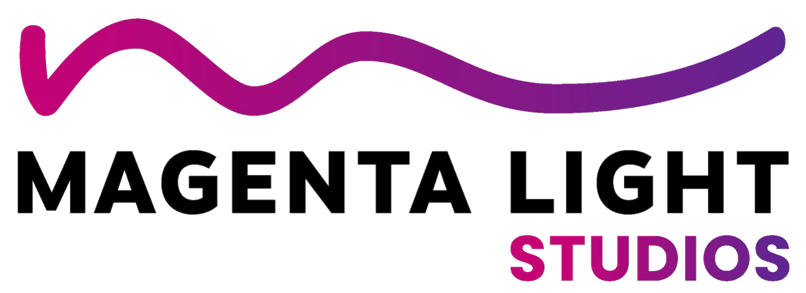
- Type: Private
- Industry: Film distribution; Film production
- Founded: March 8, 2024; 2 years ago
- Founder: Bob Yari
- Headquarters: Los Angeles, California, United States
- Services: Film distribution; Film financing
- Website: magentalightstudios.com

Magenta Light Studios is an American motion picture distribution company founded by Bob Yari.

== History ==
In March 2024, it was reported that Bob Yari would be departing his role as co-CEO with producer Marvin Peart on WonderHill Studios to form Magenta Light Studios. The goal of the company is to release 3 to 5 films per year theatrically.

In December, the company hired six senior executives, including David McPherson to serve as President of Television, David Spiegelman as President of Television & Digital, Christine Manna as President of Digital, Amanda Harvey as President of Film, Sandy Solowitz as President of Post-Production and C.J. Vranca Head of Business and Legal Affairs, to expand the roster for across film, TV, and business affairs. In June 2025, the company has set a dynamic multi-year partnership agreement with Evoke Entertainment and Freefall Films. In November, Magenta Light has appointed Bill Vergos to serve as Head of Digital Film Distribution after serving Freestyle Digital Media where he was also the Head of Digital Film Distribution for 15 years.

In January 2026, it was reported that Magenta Light Studios would launch a specialty label called Magenta Edge Films for art house and independent films with the first acquisition for the label being Appofeniacs.

== Filmography ==
=== Magenta Light Studios ===
| Release date | Title | Director | Refs |
|---|---|---|---|
| August 23, 2024 | Strange Darling | JT Mollner | |
| June 20, 2025 | Bride Hard | Simon West | |
| March 6, 2026 | Protector | Adrian Grünberg | |
| April 17, 2026 | Fireflies at El Mozote | Ernesto Melara | |
| May 1, 2026 | Deep Water | Renny Harlin | |
| October 9, 2026 | California Schemin' | James McAvoy | |
| October 15, 2026 | Maserati: The Brothers | Robert Moresco | |
| December 4, 2026 | Flavia | Bharat Nalluri | |
| January 8, 2027 | Hurricanna | Francesca Gregorini | |
| February 5, 2027 | Lice | Jonathan Bensimon | |
| April 16, 2027 | Chasing Summer | Josephine Decker | |
| 2027 | Twilight of the Dead | Doron Paz and Yoav Paz | |
| TBA | Summerhouse | Ed Kaplan | |
| TBA | Garden City | John Curran | |
| TBA | The King of the Internet | Fabrício Bittar | |

=== Magenta Edge Films ===
| Release date | Title | Director | Refs |
|---|---|---|---|
| August 8, 2026 | Lockjaw | Sabrina Greco | |
| September 11, 2026 | Misfit Mentor | Neil Garguilo | |
| September 20, 2026 | Good Sport | Andrew Jack Zuckerman | |
| September 22, 2026 | Concessions | Mas Bouzidi | |
| October 2, 2026 | Appofeniacs | Chris Marrs Piliero | |
| November 6, 2026 | Kratom: Side Effects May Include | Jamie and Jason Neese | |
| November 17, 2026 | Segal | Vernon Davidson, Ryan Krayser | |
| January 8, 2027 | Billy Knight | Alec Griffin Roth | |
