= Hurricanna =

- Theatrical release poster
- Directed by: Francesca Gregorini
- Written by: Rachel Sarnoff; Matt Sarnoff
- Produced by: Cassian Elwes; Francesca Gregorini; Rory Koslow; Alix Madigan
- Starring: Sylvia Hoeks; Holly Hunter; Mark Duplass; Nicholas Hamilton; Kevin Sussman; Michael Nouri
- Cinematography: Lyle Vincent
- Edited by: Susana Benaim
- Music by: Wynne Bennett
- Production companies: Elevated Films; Well Told; Rosevalentine Productions; CaliWood Pictures
- Distributed by: Magenta Light Studios
- Release dates: June 11, 2025 (Provincetown); January 8, 2027 (United States)
- Running time: 99 minutes
- Country: United States
- Language: English

Hurricanna is a 2025 American biographical drama film directed by Francesca Gregorini and written by Rachel and Matt Sarnoff. It stars Sylvia Hoeks, Holly Hunter, Mark Duplass, Nicholas Hamilton, Kevin Sussman, and Michael Nouri.

The film premiered at the Provincetown International Film Festival on June 11, 2025.

== Cast ==
- Sylvia Hoeks as Anna Nicole Smith
- Holly Hunter as Anna's therapist
- Mark Duplass as attorney Howard K. Stern
- Nicholas Hamilton as Daniel
- Kevin Sussman as Bipolar Man
- Michael Nouri as The Ex
- Lilly Krug as The Receptionist
- Tom Bower as Dentist
- Iqbal Theba
- Shakira Barrera as DHS Agent

== Production ==
In February 2022, it was announced that a biographical drama film that depicted the final days of actress and Playboy model Anna Nicole Smith was in development, with Francesca Gregorini directing, and Rachel and Matt Sarnoff writing the script. Holly Hunter joined the cast that month. In February 2023, Sylvia Hoeks joined the film as Anna Nicole Smith.

Principal photography began in December 2023, when Mark Duplass, Nicholas Hamilton, Kevin Sussman, Michael Nouri, Lilly Krug, Tom Bower, Iqbal Theba, and Shakira Barrera rounded out the cast.

== Release ==
Hurricanna premiered at the Provincetown International Film Festival on June 11, 2025. In May 2026, Magenta Light Studios acquired the United States and Canada distribution rights to the film, and will release it on January 8, 2027. The film was originally scheduled to be released on November 13, 2026.
