= Woody McClain =

American actor and model (born 1989)

- Born: May 14, 1989 (age 37); Charleston, South Carolina , U.S.
- Education: Riverside High School
- Occupation: Actor
- Years active: 2015–present

Woody McClain is an American actor. He is best known for his roles as Cane Tejada in the TV series Power Book II: Ghost (2020–24), and Bobby Brown in BET's miniseries The New Edition Story (2017).

== Early life and education ==
McClain graduated from Robert E. Lee High School in Jacksonville, Florida, in 2008, after moving there for his senior year. He later attended Florida A&M University, where he was a part of the Marching 100 band, in 2012.

== Personal life ==
On April 1, 2025, McClain and his girlfriend Charlie B announced that they were expecting twin girls. On July 1, 2025, the pair revealed pictures from their baby shower. They later welcomed twin daughters named Emily and Amaya, in the fall of 2025.

On May 31, 2025, McClain took to social media to apologize for how he reacted on a Cam Newton podcast.

== Filmography ==
=== Film ===
Year	Title	Role	Notes
2017	Black + Blue	Man	Short
2017	You're Sexist	Woody	Short
2018	Canal Street	MayMay	
2019	Cabal	Martin	Short
2020	Death of a Telemarketer	Barry	
2021	A Little Closure	Woody	Short
2021	The Harder They Fall	Clyde Grimes	
2023	Desperation Road	Boyd	
2027	Get Lite †	TBA	Filming

=== Television ===
Year	Title	Role	Notes
2017	The New Edition Story	Bobby Brown	Episode: "Part 1-3"
2017	Training Day	Raw Dogg	Episode: "Bad Day at Aqua Mesa"
2017	Tales	Slim	Recurring Cast: Season 1
2018	Unsolved	Jimmy 'Henchman' Rosemund	Recurring Cast
2018	Giants	Rocco	Episode: "Okay in the Silence"
2018	The Bobby Brown Story	Bobby Brown	Episode: "Part 1-2"
2020-24	Power Book II: Ghost	Lorenzo "Cane" Tejada Jr.	Main Cast
2021	S.W.A.T.	Chris	Episode: "Crusade"
2022	East New York	Demonté Green	Episode: "The Small Things"
