= Ceyair Wright =

American football player (born 2002)

No. 22 – Cincinnati Bengals
- Position: Cornerback
- Roster status: Exempt/Left Squad

Personal information
- Born: December 19, 2002 (age 23)
- Listed height: 6 ft 0 in (1.83 m)
- Listed weight: 185 lb (84 kg)

Career information
- High school: Loyola (Los Angeles, California)
- College: USC (2021–2023); Nebraska (2024–2025)
- NFL draft: 2026: undrafted

Career history
- Cincinnati Bengals (2026–present)
- Stats at Pro Football Reference

Ceyair J. Wright (born December 19, 2002) is an American professional football cornerback for the Cincinnati Bengals of the National Football League (NFL). He played college football for the USC Trojans and Nebraska Cornhuskers. Wright is also an actor most known for his roles in Space Jam: A New Legacy, American Skin, and Magic '85.

== Early life ==
Wright attended Loyola High School located on Los Angeles, California. Coming out of high school, Wright was rated as a four-star recruit, where he also held offers from schools such as Arizona State, Michigan, Notre Dame, Oregon, and USC. Ultimately, Wright decided to commit to play college football for the USC Trojans.

== College career ==
=== USC ===
During his three-year career with the Trojans from 2021 through 2023, Wright appeared in 23 games where he notched 41 tackles with one being for a loss, five pass deflections, and an interception for USC. After the 2023 season, he entered his name into the NCAA transfer portal.

=== Nebraska ===
Wright transferred to play for the Nebraska Cornhuskers. In week four of the 2024 season, he notched six tackles with one being for a loss, a sack, and a forced fumble against Illinois. In week 11 versus his former team USC, Wright tallied four tackles, a blocked field goal, and an interception which he returned 27 yards for his first career touchdown.

== Professional career ==
Pre-draft measurables
Height	Weight	Arm length	Hand span	Wingspan	40-yard dash	10-yard split	20-yard split	20-yard shuttle	Three-cone drill	Vertical jump	Broad jump	Bench press
6 ft 0 in (1.83 m)	185 lb (84 kg)	31 1/8 in (0.79 m)	9 in (0.23 m)	6 ft 3 1/8 in (1.91 m)	4.56 s	1.67 s	2.65 s	4.40 s	7.02 s	35.0 in (0.89 m)	10 ft 0 in (3.05 m)	17 reps
All values from Pro Day

On May 8, 2026, Wright signed with the Cincinnati Bengals as an undrafted free agent. On August 15, Wright was placed on the Bengals' exempt/left squad list, which does not count against the team's 90-man roster, to pursue an acting opportunity of an unnamed film. Wright was placed on the Bengals exempt/left squad list, allowing them to retain his rights should he attempt to return to football in the future.

== Filmography ==
=== Film ===
Year	Title	Role	Notes
2017	Magic '85	Andrey	Short film
2019	American Skin	Jonah	
2021	Space Jam: A New Legacy	Darius James	
2027	Get Lite	TBA	Filming

=== Television ===
Year	Title	Role	Notes
2014	Instant Mom	Darren Mockler	Episode: "James Goes Pro"
2017	2 Broke Girls	Kid	Episode: "And the River Boat Runs Through It"
2017	Training Day	14 year-old Kyle	Episode: "Apocalypse Now"
2022–2023	Grown-ish	Zeke	Main role (Season 5, 14 episodes); Guest role (Season 6, 1 episode)

== Personal life ==
Wright is the nephew of former USC tailback, Mazio Royster. His cousin, Darick Holmes, played as a running back at Portland State and then in the NFL. His cousin, Darnay Holmes played as a cornerback at UCLA and is with the Atlanta Falcons.
