= Lice (film) =

- Directed by: Jonathan Bensimon
- Written by: Anthony Musella; Shaun Harris
- Based on: an original concept by Kevin Connolly
- Produced by: Kevin Connolly; Patrick Marino; Jeremy Alter; Gary Goldman
- Starring: Emile Hirsch; Justin Long; Kevin Connolly
- Production company: ActionPark Productions
- Distributed by: Magenta Light Studios
- Release date: February 5, 2027
- Country: United States
- Language: English

Lice is an upcoming American horror film written by Anthony Musella and Shaun Harris, directed by Jonathan Bensimon and starring Emile Hirsch, Justin Long and Kevin Connolly. It is Bensimon’s feature directorial debut and based on an original concept by Connolly. The film is produced by Kevin Connolly and Patrick Marino's Action Park Media, marking the company's first feature film production.

== Premise ==
Set in the 1980s, the film follows a deadly outbreak of parasitic lice at a Long Island high school. When the school goes under military lockdown, the itch-crazed students turn on each other in a desperate struggle to survive. The film has been described as a horror mashup of The Breakfast Club and Lord of the Flies.

== Cast ==
- Emile Hirsch as Mr. Shanker
- Justin Long as Principal Van
- Kevin Connolly as Detective Sikorski
- Émilie Bierre
- Joelle Farrow
- Riley Davis
- Tom Keat
- Annamarie Kasper
- Cooper Levy
- Christian Meer
- Gage Munroe
- Devyn Nekoda
- Sabrina Saudin
- Milton Torres Lara

== Production ==
Principal photography began in March 2025 in Canada. Director Jonathan Bensimon also serves as cinematographer on the production, and has stated plans to use Kodak and Cinestill film stocks to give the film its own signature visual look.

In May 2025, it was announced that Hirsch, Long and Connolly were cast in the film.

The film is based on an original concept by Kevin Connolly, with a script written by Anthony Musella and Shaun Harris. Connolly produces alongside Patrick Marino, Jeremy Alter and Gary Goldman.

In June 2025, filming wrapped in Canada.

Highland Film Group is handling worldwide sales for the film.

== Release ==
In May 2026, Magenta Light Studios acquired the distribution rights. Lice is scheduled to be released in the United States on February 5, 2027.
