= 2027–28 Major League Soccer season =

33rd season of Major League Soccer

Major League Soccer
- Season: 2027–28
- Dates: July 2027 – April 2028 (regular season); May 2028 (playoffs)
- Teams: 30

The 2027–28 Major League Soccer season is the upcoming 33rd season of Major League Soccer (MLS), the top professional soccer league in the United States and Canada. It is also the 50th overall season of a national first-division men's soccer league in the United States overseen by the United States Soccer Federation. The league has 30 clubs that are divided into the Eastern and Western conferences, each with 15 teams.

The 2027–28 MLS season will be the first to use a summer–spring calendar following a shortened "sprint" 2027 season which allowed the league time to change to the new format. Following this change, Major League Soccer announced the lifting of the rule limiting teams to two non-league competitions per season. As a result, for the first time since 2023, all 27 US-based MLS teams will participate in the U.S. Open Cup, with first-round matches being played in July 2027, just prior to the start of the 2027–28 season, as well as allowing for participation in Leagues Cup and CONCACAF Champions Cup. (Note: CF Montréal, Toronto FC and Vancouver Whitecaps FC, all based in Canada, are not eligible to play in the U.S. Open Cup.)

All MLS matches during the regular season and playoffs are planned to be broadcast on Apple TV, an online streaming service operated by Apple Inc.

== Background ==
When MLS began play in 1996, they elected to follow a spring–winter schedule to avoid conflicts with the National Football League; in 1996, every MLS team played in NFL or college football stadiums. (Note: As of 2026, 20 of the 30 MLS teams play in soccer-specific stadiums.) In late 2025, MLS owners voted to shift the MLS calendar away from the schedule they had adopted since the league began in 1996 to a summer–spring calendar to align with the top European soccer leagues. The shift was made to help MLS teams align with global transfer windows, avoid international breaks, and hold playoffs without calendar interruptions. MLS started surveying fans and owners in 2024 to gauge interest in the calendar shift, and on a vote by MLS ownership on November 13, 2025, they officially approved the calendar change.

== Format ==
The 2027–28 season, the first full-length MLS season since the 2026 Major League Soccer season, will start in July 2027 and run through April 2028; the MLS Cup playoffs and MLS Cup final will be held in May 2028. As part of the new calendar, MLS will observe a midwinter break from mid-December 2027 through early February 2028; no league matches will be scheduled in January 2028.

== Teams ==
=== Stadiums and locations ===
Etihad Park, the new home of New York City FC, is expected to open in time for the 2027–28 season.

Locations of teams for the 2027–28 Major League Soccer season
Western Conference Eastern Conference

Team	Stadium	Capacity
Atlanta United FC	Mercedes-Benz Stadium	42,500
Austin FC	Q2 Stadium	20,738
CF Montréal	Saputo Stadium	19,619
Charlotte FC	Bank of America Stadium	38,000
Chicago Fire FC	Soldier Field/McDonald's Park (opening early 2028)	24,955 22,000
Colorado Rapids	Dick's Sporting Goods Park	18,061
Columbus Crew	ScottsMiracle-Gro Field	20,011
D.C. United	Audi Field	20,000
FC Cincinnati	TQL Stadium	26,000
FC Dallas	Toyota Stadium	20,500
Houston Dynamo FC	Shell Energy Stadium	22,039
Inter Miami CF	Nu Stadium	26,700
LA Galaxy	Dignity Health Sports Park	27,000
Los Angeles FC	BMO Stadium	22,000
Minnesota United FC	Allianz Field	19,400
Nashville SC	Geodis Park	30,000
New England Revolution	Gillette Stadium	20,000
New York City FC	Etihad Park	25,000
New York Red Bulls	Sports Illustrated Stadium	25,000
Orlando City SC	Inter.co Stadium	25,500
Philadelphia Union	Subaru Park	18,500
Portland Timbers	Providence Park	25,218
Real Salt Lake	America First Field	20,213
San Diego FC	Snapdragon Stadium	35,000
San Jose Earthquakes	PayPal Park	18,000
Seattle Sounders FC	Lumen Field	37,722
Sporting Kansas City	Sporting Park	18,467
St. Louis City SC	Energizer Park	22,423
Toronto FC	BMO Field	28,351
Vancouver Whitecaps FC	BC Place	22,120

1. Non-soccer specific stadium and artificially reduced capacity. Capacity may be increased to full capacity if demand requires.
