= Scared to Death (2024 film) =

Film by Paul Boyd

- Promotional poster
- Directed by: Paul Boyd
- Written by: Paul Boyd
- Produced by: Eric Barrett; Todd Slater
- Starring: Lin Shaye; Bill Moseley; Olivier Paris; Victoria Konefal; B.J. Minor; Jade Chynoweth; Rae Dawn Chong; Lucinda Jenney; Kurt Deimer
- Cinematography: Steven Poster
- Edited by: Ed Shiers
- Music by: Misha Segal
- Production companies: Bald Man Films; Convoke Media; Mirror Films
- Distributed by: Atlas Distribution
- Release dates: August 11, 2024 (Popcorn Frights); March 13, 2026
- Running time: 98 minutes
- Country: United States
- Language: English
- Box office: $35,925

Scared to Death is a 2024 American comedy horror film written and directed by Paul Boyd. It stars Lin Shaye, Bill Moseley, Olivier Paris, Victoria Konefal, B.J. Minor, Jade Chynoweth, Rae Dawn Chong, Lucinda Jenney, and Kurt Deimer. It premiered at Popcorn Frights Film Festival on August 11, 2024, and was released in limited theaters in the United States on March 13, 2026.

== Premise ==
Jasper is a production assistant who is eager to advance as a director in Hollywood, proposes to his boss that the crew and actors of their upcoming horror film should experience a real séance. They choose a 70 year-old abandoned children's shelter for research. As the séance starts, Jasper and the crew become trapped in the shelter and haunted by the murdered orphans who were found "scared to death" in 1954.

== Cast ==
- Lin Shaye as Max
- Bill Moseley as Felix
- Olivier Paris as Jasper
- Victoria Konefal as Lena
- Jade Chynoweth as Champ
- B.J. Minor as Johnny
- Kurt Deimer as The Grog
- Rae Dawn Chong as Ruth
- Lucinda Jenney as Detective Harris

== Production ==
In February 2023, it was reported that Paul Boyd would direct the film from a screenplay he wrote, while Lin Shaye signed on to executive produce and star. Bill Moseley, Olivier Paris and Victoria Konefal were cast in main roles. Principal photography took place in Los Angeles in March 2023. The film used Legacy Effects for the special effects.

== Release ==
Scared to Death premiered at Popcorn Frights Film Festival in Fort Lauderdale, Florida on August 11, 2024. It was the closing film at the New York City Horror Film Festival on December 8, 2024. The film had its international premiere in London with a screening at FrightFest Glasgow on March 8, 2025. It was released in limited theaters in the United States by Atlas Distribution on March 13, 2026.

On the review aggregator website Rotten Tomatoes, 64% of 11 critics' reviews are positive, with an average rating of 5.5/10.
