= Chris Marrs Piliero =

American film director

Chris Marrs Piliero is an American actor, writer, producer, and director of short films and music videos.

Piliero directed the 2010 music video for Tighten Up by The Black Keys, which won the 2010 MTV Video Music Award for Breakthrough Video.

Piliero subsequently directed the music video for Howlin' for You by The Black Keys—a parody in the form of an action movie trailer. Released in February 2011, it includes Dan Auerbach and Patrick Carney (The Black Keys) in a minor role of two henchmen referred to as "Las Teclas de Negro". The video was nominated for the 2011 MTV Video Music Award for Best Rock Video. An interview with Piliero during the filming of this video was released in March 2011 with some commentary about the filming, and short clips of the cast describing their characters.

Piliero also wrote and directed many other music videos, including the 2010 video If You Let Me by Chrissie Hynde's band JP, Chrissie and the Fairground Boys and the 2011 videos I Wanna Go and Criminal by Britney Spears.

== Filmography ==
List of film appearances, with year, title, and role shown
| Year | Title | Role | Notes |
|---|---|---|---|
| 2025 | Appofeniacs | Director | |

== Partial list of music videos ==
| Release date | Title | Artist |
|---|---|---|
| April 19, 2007 | "Be Good to Me" | Ashley Tisdale |
| August 17, 2008 | Boot of Chinese Plastic | The Pretenders |
| May 30, 2009 | OK It's Alright With Me | Eric Hutchinson |
| September 30, 2009 | Crash | Cavo |
| March 30, 2010 | Love Like Woe | The Ready Set |
| May 30, 2010 | Next Girl | The Black Keys |
| July 18, 2010 | If You Think This Song Is About You, It Probably Is | D.R.U.G.S. |
| August 4, 2010 | "If You Let Me" | JP, Chrissie and the Fairground Boys |
| May 20, 2010 | "Tighten Up" ^{1} | The Black Keys |
| November 4, 2010 | "Hey Baby, Here's That Song You Wanted" | Blessthefall |
| February 10, 2011 | "Howlin' for You" | The Black Keys |
| February 20, 2011 | "For You and Your Denial" | Yellowcard |
| February 25, 2011 | "Blow" | Kesha |
| March 31, 2011 | "Hang You Up" | Yellowcard |
| April 30, 2011 | "Superlover" | Lucy Fleming |
| June 7, 2011 | "Around My Head" | Cage the Elephant |
| June 22, 2011 | "I Wanna Go" | Britney Spears |
| September 28, 2011 | Faith (When I Let You Down) | Taking Back Sunday |
| September 30, 2011 | All Signs Point to Lauderdale | A Day to Remember |
| October 17, 2011 | "Criminal" | Britney Spears |
| April 25, 2012 | Dancing in My Head (Tom Hangs Remix) | Eric Turner |
| October 15, 2012 | "I Found You" | The Wanted |
| October 22, 2012 | "The Baddest Man Alive" | The Black Keys and RZA |
| January 4, 2013 | "Thank You" | MKTO |
| February 24, 2013 | "Thank You Very Much" | Margaret |
| April 30, 2013 | "Popular Song" | MIKA ft. Ariana Grande |
| May 28, 2013 | "People Like Us" | Kelly Clarkson |
| August 20, 2013 | "Rock N Roll" | Avril Lavigne |
| June 2, 2014 | "Hello, You Beautiful Thing" | Jason Mraz |
| July 1, 2014 | "Ugly Heart" | G.R.L. |
| August 12, 2014 | "Break Free" | Ariana Grande ft. Zedd |
| November 24, 2014 | "Santa Tell Me" | Ariana Grande |
| December 16, 2014 | Get Over It | McBusted |
| January 12, 2015 | Something's Gotta Give | All Time Low |
| December 16, 2016 | Life Goes On | Fergie |
| February 27, 2017 | "Everyday" | Ariana Grande ft. Future |

Footnotes:

- ^{1} There are two versions of "Tighten Up". Piliero's is the later, "official" video.
