= 2027 in American music =

The following is a list of events and releases that have happened or are expected to happen in 2027 in music in the United States.

== Notable events ==
=== January ===
- 8 – Carissa's Wierd will release their first studio album in twenty-five years, Somewhere Further Than Far Away.
- 15 – Soul Glo will release their first studio album in five years, Na I'm Gon Grab Allat.
  - Brandy Clark will release her first studio album in four years, The Bird.
  - Dirty Honey will release their first studio album in nearly four years, Catch My Butterfly.
- 22 – The Flaming Lips will release their first studio album in nearly seven years, The Teardrop Throbs.
  - Teddy Swims will release his first studio album in four years, Ugly.
  - Clutch will release their first studio album in nearly five years, Wasted Lands.
  - Knifeplay will release their first studio album in five years, What Is Truth?.
- 29 – The Offspring will release their first live album, Just the Punk Stuff – Live at The Stone Pony.
  - Seven Kingdoms will release their first studio album in five years, Sono Sola.
  - Clap Your Hands Say Yeah will release their first studio album in six years, Burned.
  - Avery Cochrane will release her first full length debut album, Vengenace Through My Omnipresence.
  - MxPx will release their first studio album in four years, Living in the Chaos.
  - Silent Planet will release their first studio album in nearly four years, Infinite Sleep.

=== February ===
- 7 – The 69th Annual Grammy Awards will take place at the Crypto.com Arena in Los Angeles, California. This will be the first Grammy Awards in a ten year deal with ABC.
- 12 – She Wants Revenge will release their first studio album in sixteen years, The Loved.
  - Julien Baker will release her first solo studio album in six years, This World or the Next.
  - Currents will release their first studio album in four years, Our Fates Lie in Tandem.
  - Robert Cray will release his first studio album in seven years, All Over Again.
- 14 – Jay-Z is scheduled to perform the halftime show during Super Bowl LXI at SoFi Stadium in Inglewood, California.
- 19 – Heathen will release their first studio album in seven years, Lifetime in Hell.
- 26 – Blondie will release their first studio album in ten years, High Noon. It will be their first since the 2025 death of longtime drummer Clem Burke, who contributed to the album prior to his death.
  - Slash featuring Myles Kennedy and the Conspirators will release their first studio album in five years, Flying Blind.
  - Coi Leray will release her first studio album in four years, Multi.

=== March ===
- 5 – Staind will release their first studio album in four years, The Space Between the Darkness and the Light.
  - Liars will release their first studio album in six years, A Ban on Plastic Bag Bans.
- 12 – Dragged Under will release their first studio album in five years, Social Battery: Low.
- 26 – Starcrawler will release their first studio album in five years, Kick Me.

=== April ===
- 9 – Fear Factory will release their first studio album in six years, Roboticist. It will be their first studio album with current vocalist Milo Silvestro, who replaced original singer Burton C. Bell in 2023, and drummer Pete Webber, who replaced Mike Heller the same year.
- 16 – Oh, Sleeper will release their first studio album in eight years, Back to the Wild.

=== First quarter ===
- 4 Non Blondes will release their first studio album in thirty-five years, 1994.
- The Ataris will release their first studio album in twenty years, Revolution Summer.
- Death Angel will release their first studio album in eight years.
- The Internet will release their first studio album in nine years.
- Nevermore will release their first studio album in seventeen years. It will be their first studio album with new singer Berzan Önen as the replacement of Warrel Dane, who died in 2017.
- Overkill will release their first studio album in four years. It will be the band's first release with Jeramie Kling, who replaced Jason Bittner as their drummer in 2024.
- Trixter will release their first studio album in twelve years.

=== Unknown date ===
- Atheist will release their first studio album in seventeen years.
- Autopsy will release their first studio album in four years.
- Bad Religion will release their first studio album in eight years.
- Boyz II Men will release their first studio album in ten years and their first of original material in thirteen years. It will be the group's first country album.
- Candlebox will release their first studio album in four years after apparently abandoning their plans to disband.
- Chelsea Grin will release their first studio album in four years.
- Cro-Mags will release their first studio album in seven years.
- Crowbar will release their first studio album in five years.
- Filter will release their first studio album in four years, The Antidote.
- Hollywood Undead will release their first studio album in five years.
- The Killers will release their first studio album in six years.
- Ice Nine Kills will release their first studio album in six years, The Silver Scream 3: Every Flick in the Book.
- The Interrupters will release their first studio album in five years.
- Living Colour will release their first studio album in ten years.
- Misery Index will release their first studio album in five years.
- Mucky Pup will release their first studio album in thirty-two years.
- Obituary will release their first studio album in four years.
- Power Trip will release their first studio album in ten years. It will be their first release with new singer Seth Gilmore as the replacement of Riley Gale, who died in 2020.
- Primus will release their first studio album in ten years.
- Queensrÿche will release their first studio album in five years.
- Red Hot Chili Peppers will release their first studio album in five years. It will be their third album together with guitarist John Frusciante since his second return to the band in 2019.
- Sacred Reich will release their first studio album in eight years, Into the Abyss.
- Shadows Fall will release their first studio album in fifteen years.
- Soil will release their first studio album in fourteen years.
- Stevie Wonder will release his first studio album in twenty-two years, Through the Eyes of Wonder.
- Symphony X will release their first studio album in twelve years.
- Tool will release their first studio album in eight years.
- Ugly Kid Joe will release their first studio album in five years.
- Unearth will release their first studio album in four years.
- Vektor will release their first studio album in eleven years.
- Yob will release their first studio album in nine years. It will be their first album with drummer Dave French, who replaced former drummer Travis Foster in 2023.

== List of albums set to be released ==
=== January ===
Date	Album	Artist	Genre (s)
8	Somewhere Further Than Far Away	Carissa's Wierd	Indie rock; chamber pop
15	The Bird	Brandy Clark	Country; pop
15	Na I'm Gonna Grab Allat	Soul Glo	Hardcore punk; punk rock; hip-hop
22	Wasted Lands	Clutch	Hard rock; blues rock; rock
22	Speculation and Gossip	Guided by Voices	Indie rock; lo-fi
22	Amsterdamage	Palaye Royale	Art rock; garage rock; alternative rock
22	Ugly	Teddy Swims	R&B; soul
29	Vengenace Through My Omnipresence	Avery Cochrane	Synth-pop; dance-pop
29	What Kind of Hell Did You Survive?	Cloud Nothings	Indie rock; noise rock; post-punk
29	Just the Punk Stuff – Live at The Stone Pony	The Offspring	Punk rock; skate punk; pop-punk; alternative rock
29	Sono Sola	Seven Kingdoms	Hard rock; heavy metal

=== February ===
Date	Album	Artist	Genre (s)
5	As I Lay Dying	As I Lay Dying	Melodic metalcore; thrash metal
19	Lifetime in Hell	Heathen	Thrash metal
19	Lowest Form	200 Stab Wounds	Death metal
26	Flying Blind	Slash feat. Myles Kennedy & The Conspirators	Hard rock; heavy metal
26	High Noon	Blondie	New wave; punk rock; power pop; dance-rock

=== March ===
Date	Album	Artist	Genre (s)
5	Bounce House	Eric Slick	Indie rock

== Unknown date ==
=== First quarter ===
- 1994 by 4 Non Blondes
- Revolution Summer by The Ataris
- TBA by Death Angel
- TBA by Fear Factory
- TBA by The Internet
- TBA by Nevermore
- TBA by Overkill
- TBA by Slash featuring Myles Kennedy and the Conspirators
- TBA by Trixter

=== Second quarter ===
- TBA by Mammoth

=== TBA ===
- TBA by Atheist
- TBA by Autopsy
- TBA by Bad Religion
- Death Wish by Body Count
- TBA by Candlebox
- TBA by Cro-Mags
- TBA by Crowbar
- TBA by Dream Theater
- TBA by Exhorder
- TBA by The Interrupters
- TBA by The Killers
- TBA by Living Colour
- TBA by Mucky Pup
- TBA by Obituary
- TBA by Power Trip
- TBA by Primus
- TBA by Queensrÿche
- TBA by Red Hot Chili Peppers
- Into the Abyss by Sacred Reich
- TBA by Soil
- TBA by Staind
- Through the Eyes of Wonder by Stevie Wonder
- TBA by Symphony X
- TBA by Testament
- TBA by Tool
- TBA by Vektor
