= Sylvia Hoeks =

Dutch actress (born 1983)

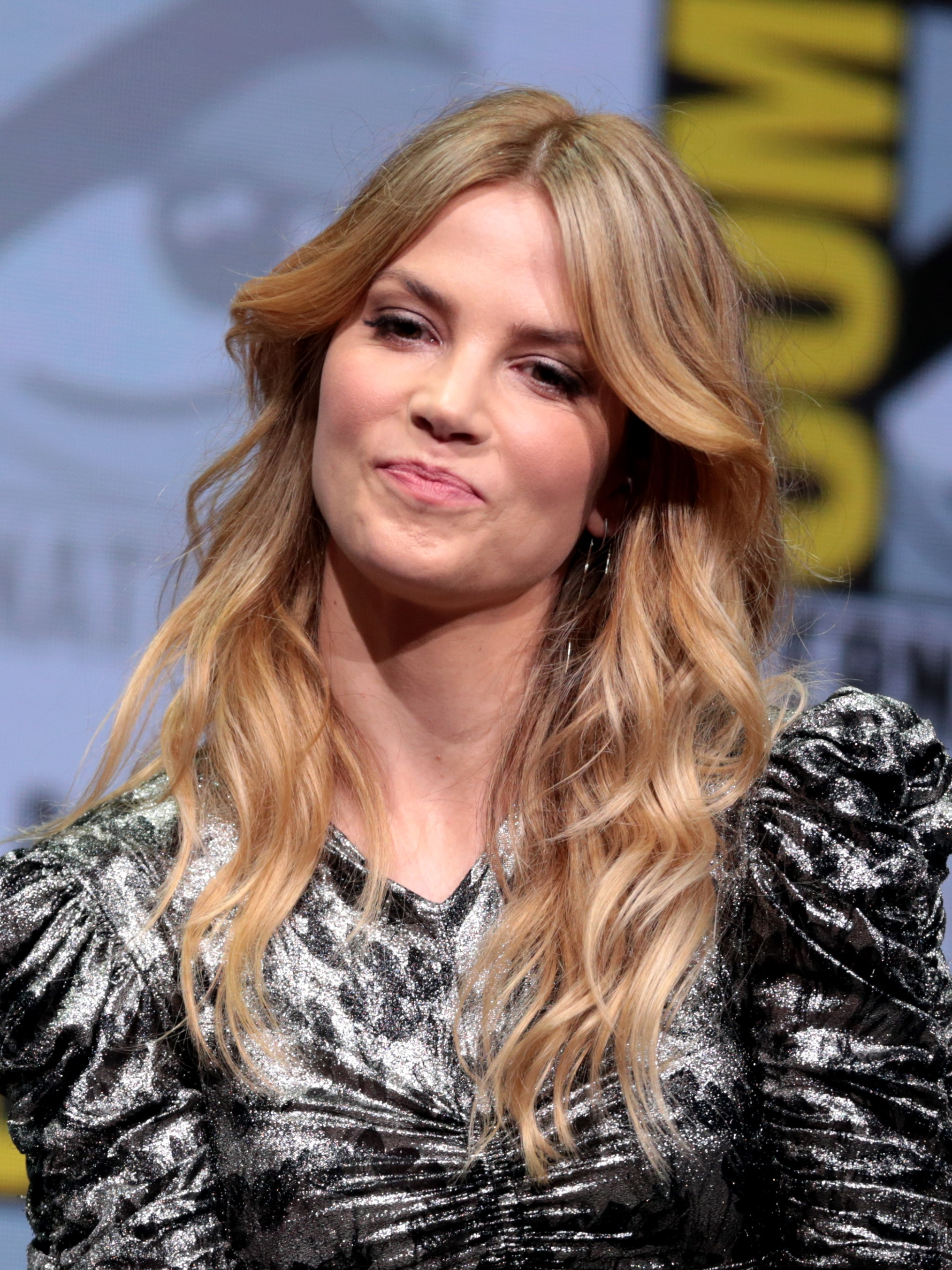
- Hoeks at the 2017 San Diego Comic-Con
- Born: 1 June 1983 (age 43); Maarheeze, North Brabant, Netherlands
- Other names: Sylvia Hoecks; Sylvia Hoek
- Education: Maastricht Academy of Dramatic Arts
- Occupations: Actress; model
- Years active: 1997–present

Sylvia Hoeks (Dutch: [ˈsɪlvijaː ˈɦuks]; born 1 June 1983) is a Dutch actress and former model, best known internationally for her roles in Blade Runner 2049 (2017) and The Girl in the Spider's Web (2018).

== Early life and education ==
Hoeks was raised in Maarheeze, North Brabant, Netherlands. After finishing high school, she attended the Maastricht Academy of Dramatic Arts.

Besides her native Dutch, Hoeks speaks German, French and English and appears in productions made in those languages.

== Career ==
Hoeks was scouted by Elite Model Management at age 14. Her first job was a cover for Elle Girl, and she traveled Europe as a model for several years while attending high school.

Shortly after graduation from college, Hoeks had a main role in the Dutch TV film Staatsgevaarlijk. In 2005, Hoeks appeared as a mistress in the series Gooische Vrouwen and had a main role in the psychological thriller series Vuurzee.

Hoeks' breakthrough was in the Jos Stelling film Duska (2007). She won a Golden Calf (the Dutch equivalent of an Academy Award) for Best Supporting Actress for the role. She next played Vanessa in Tiramisu (2008), Julia in The Storm (2009), the title role in Tirza (2010), Johanna van Heesch in The Gang of Oss (2011), and Elise in The Girl and Death (2012). She then starred in the Dutch TV drama series Bloedverwanten (Blood Relatives) from 2010 to 2014, as well as the Dutch TV thriller series Overspel (Adultery) from 2011 to 2015. In 2013, Hoeks played Claire Ibbetson in the film The Best Offer, her first international role.

Hoeks portrayed the replicant Luv in the 2017 science fiction film Blade Runner 2049. She trained with weights and in martial arts for six hours a day, six days a week before and during filming. Hoeks then appeared as Lara Simic in the Steven Quale-directed action film Renegades in the same year. In February 2017, she was cast as Leigh in All the Devil's Men; the film was released in 2018. That same year, Hoeks played Lisbeth Salander's sister in the thriller The Girl in the Spider's Web, the sequel to The Girl with the Dragon Tattoo. In 2019–2022, she appeared as Queen Kane in the Apple TV+ drama series See.

Since 2024, Hoeks voices Sigrid, a lead character in the Netflix animated series Twilight of the Gods. Also in 2024, Hoeks starred in Jordan Scott's thriller A Sacrifice. The film is produced by Ridley Scott's Scott Free Productions and also stars Eric Bana and Sadie Sink. Hoeks then portrayed Anna Nicole Smith in the 2025 biopic Hurricanna, her first lead role in an international production.

== Filmography ==
=== Film ===
Year	Title	Role	Notes
2005	Frankie	Rumina	
2007	Duska	The Girl	
2008	Tiramisu	Vanessa	
2009	The Storm	Julia	
2010	Tirza	Tirza	
2011	The Gang of Oss	Johanna van Heesch	
2012	Vatertage – Opa über Nacht	Debbie	
2012	The Girl and Death	Elise	
2013	The Best Offer	Claire Ibbetson	
2013	Bro's Before Ho's	Anna	
2017	Whatever Happens	Hannah	
2017	Blade Runner 2049	Luv	
2017	Renegades	Lara Simic	
2018	All the Devil's Men	Leigh	
2018	The Girl in the Spider's Web	Camilla Salander	
2021	Plan A	Anna	
2024	A Sacrifice	Nina	
2024	It Doesn't Matter	—N/a	Executive producer
2025	Hurricanna	Anna Nicole Smith	
2025	Mother	Sister Agnieszka	
2027	Lords of War	TBA	Post-production
TBA	Seacole	Florence Nightingale	Post-production

=== Television ===
Year	Title	Role	Notes
2005	Staatsgevaarlijk	Nicolette	Television film
2005–2009	Vuurzee	Sonja Looman	Main role (24 episodes)
2006	Gooische Vrouwen	Lucy	4 episodes
2009	Taartman	Tara	Television film
2009–2013	't Schaep met de 5 pooten	Ellie de Beer	3 episodes
2010–2014	Bloedverwanten	Antje Zwager	Main role (24 episodes)
2011–2015	Overspel	Iris van Erkel-Hoegaarde	Main role (32 episodes)
2016	Berlin Station	Claudia Gartner	2 episodes
2019–2022	See	Queen Kane	Main role
2024	Twilight of the Gods	Sigrid	Main role; voice
2026	Ride or Die	Ana	8 episodes
2026	Black Doves	Katia Chernov	5 episodes

== Awards ==
- 2007: Golden Calf for Best Supporting Actress for Duska
- 2009: Best Actress at the Festroia International Film Festival for The Storm
- 2011: Shooting Stars Award
- 2014: Sylvia Kristel Award
- 2017: IGN's Best of 2017 Award nomination for Best Supporting Performer in a Movie for Blade Runner 2049
