= Get Lite =

- Directed by: Teyana Taylor
- Screenplay by: Maurice Williams
- Story by: Eric Goss
- Produced by: Teyana Taylor; Storm Reid; Marty Bowen; Simon Kinberg; Robyn Simpson; Bill Karesh; Courtney Gilbert
- Starring: Storm Reid; Ceyair Wright; Leslie Odom Jr.; Aunjanue Ellis-Taylor; Woody McClain; Jodie Turner-Smith; Asante Blackk; Nia Long
- Cinematography: Rina Yang
- Production companies: Temple Hill Entertainment; Khalabo Ink Society; A Seed & Wings Productions; OFFBRND Pictures; The Aunties; Kinberg Genre Films
- Distributed by: Paramount Pictures
- Release date: August 20, 2027
- Country: United States
- Language: English

Get Lite is an upcoming American coming-of-age musical drama film directed and co-produced by Teyana Taylor from a screenplay by Maurice Williams. It stars Storm Reid, Ceyair Wright, Leslie Odom Jr., Aunjanue Ellis-Taylor, Woody McClain, Jodie Turner-Smith, Asante Blackk, and Nia Long.

Get Lite is scheduled to be released in the United States on August 20, 2027.

== Cast ==
- Storm Reid
- Ceyair Wright
- Leslie Odom Jr.
- Aunjanue Ellis-Taylor
- Woody McClain
- Jodie Turner-Smith
- Asante Blackk
- Nia Long

== Production ==
In December 2020, it was reported that a film titled Get Lite was in early development, when the script by Eric Goss was submitted for the 2020 The Black List. In March 2024, it was announced that Teyana Taylor would make her directorial debut for Paramount Pictures, with Storm Reid cast in the lead role as well as co-producing. In September 2026, Ceyair Wright, Leslie Odom Jr., Aunjanue Ellis-Taylor, Woody McClain, Jodie Turner-Smith, and Asante Blackk joined the cast.

Principal photography began in New York City in mid-October 2026, with Nia Long joining the cast, and Rina Yang serving as the cinematographer.

== Release ==
Get Lite is scheduled to be released in the United States on August 20, 2027.
