= Charlie Sarroff =

Australian cinematographer

- Born: Charles Arthur Sarroff; Albury, Australia
- Education: Royal Melbourne Institute of Technology; Australian Film, Television and Radio School; Global Cinematography Institute
- Occupation: Cinematographer
- Years active: 2004–present
- Organization: Australian Cinematographers Society
- Agent: Worldwide Production Agency

Charles Arthur Sarroff is an Australian cinematographer and member of the Australian Cinematographers Society. He is known for his work on the Smile series of psychological horror films, including the 2022 film Smile and its 2024 sequel Smile 2, and for the 2025 neowestern film Broke.

== Early life and education ==
Sarroff grew up in Albury and attended Albury High School. He attended university at the Royal Melbourne Institute of Technology and later attended the Australian Film, Television and Radio School. He was inspired at an early age from skateboarding films and the work of Spike Jonze.

== Career ==
Sarroff began his career in Australian film and television productions in the early 2000s. He has worked with directors including Parker Finn, Carlyle Eubank, Kelly Oxford, Bryce McGuire, and Larry Charles and is a frequent collaborator with director Natalie Erika James. During production of Night Swim, Sarroff utilized rehoused vintage Bausch & Lomb Super Baltar and Kowa Cine Prominar lenses. For his work on Smile 2, he drew inspiration from the photographs of Luc Kordas and Gregory Crewdson and the paintings of Edward Hopper.

== Filmography ==
=== Film ===
Year	Title	Director	Notes	Ref
2013	Burrow	Natalie Erika James	Canberra Short Film Festival	
2015	Hope City	Thomas Baricevic	Palm Springs International Film Festival	
2016	Zieri Cosmos	Sam Kristofski	Toronto International Film Festival	
2017	Creswick	Natalie Erika James	New York Film Festival	
2018	Drum Wave	Natalie Erika James	Sydney Film Festival	
2020	Relic	Natalie Erika James	Sundance Film Festival	
2020	Pink Skies Ahead	Kelly Oxford	South by Southwest	
2022	Smile	Parker Finn	Paramount Pictures	
2023	Dicks: The Musical	Larry Charles	A24	
2024	Night Swim	Bryce McGuire	Universal Pictures	
2024	Smile 2	Parker Finn	Paramount Pictures	
2025	Broke	Carlyle Eubank	Sony Pictures	
2026	Saccharine	Natalie Erika James	Stan	
2027	Possession	Parker Finn	Paramount Pictures	
TBA	Good People, Bad Things	Ninian Doff	MRC	

== Awards and nominations ==
Sarroff has been recognized for the following films:

- ACS Vic + Tas Gold Award for Cinematography in a Short Film, 2016, win, Creswick
- ACS Vic + Tas Gold Award for Cinematography in a Feature Film ($3m and Over), 2023, win, Smile
- ACS Vic + Tas Gold Award for Cinematography in a Feature Film (Under $5m), 2025, win, Broke
- ACS Vic + Tas Gold Award for Cinematography in a Feature Film ($5m and Over), 2025, win, Smile 2
