= Smile (film series) =

American horror film series

- Directed by: Parker Finn (1–2); David Bruckner (3)
- Written by: Parker Finn (1–2); Nick Antosca (3)
- Based on: Original characters by Parker Finn
- Distributed by: Paramount Pictures
- Release dates: September 30, 2022 (Smile); October 18, 2024 (Smile 2)
- Country: United States
- Language: English
- Budget: $45 million (2 theatrical films)
- Box office: $355.5 million (2 theatrical films)

The Smile film series consists of American psychological supernatural horror installments, including a short, a theatrical feature film, and its feature-length sequel. Based on characters and an original story by Parker Finn, the filmmaker explores elements of paranoia, psychological trauma, and fear in elements of storytelling. The plot of the series follows a number of characters who are tormented by a wicked entity that follows them unceasingly, and is ultimately determined to be the cause of their death. This force, termed by Finn as "the Monstrosity", presents itself with the identifying characteristic of a malevolent smile while it takes the form of the people that the characters encounter. While the characters frantically try to save themselves from the leering presence of death, they experience visions of a frightening nature.

The original short which debuted in the United States at the 2020 SXSW Film Festival after a previous international festival run, received critical acclaim. Following its warm reception, Paramount Pictures secured rights to a feature film adaptation, which was later revealed to be a continuation of the short. Finn was hired to again serve as writer and director. The theatrical 2022 feature film was similarly met with praise from critics, and was a box office success. Finn signed a first-look contractual deal with Paramount, before being hired for the 2024 sequel. Caitlin Stasey and Kyle Gallner are the only actors to have appeared in more than one film.

== Films ==
Film	U.S. release date	Director	Screenwriter	Story by	Producer(s)	Status
Smile	September 30, 2022	Parker Finn	Parker Finn	Parker Finn	Marty Bowen, Wyck Godfrey, Isaac Klausner and Robert Salerno	Released
Smile 2	October 18, 2024	Parker Finn	Parker Finn	Parker Finn	Marty Bowen, Parker Finn, Wyck Godfrey, Isaac Klausner and Robert Salerno	Released
Smile 3	TBA	David Bruckner	Nick Antosca	Parker Finn	Marty Bowen, Parker Finn and Wyck Godfrey	In development

=== Smile (2022) ===
Dr. Rose Cotter has spent twenty years overcoming the abusive challenges of her childhood. Now in her profession as a psychiatrist, she successfully assists her patients with a compassionate role in their lives. Upon meeting her newest patient named Laura Weaver, she is faced with a challenging case. As the terrified patient describes the distressing experiences she has endured including an extended lack of sleep convinced that she will be overcome if she rests. Laura explains that she has been followed by an evil entity ever since she witnessed her college professor bludgeon himself to death, and after stating that the entity reveals itself in the form of an unnatural smile on the faces of the people around her, panics as she tells the therapist that the specter is in the room with them. Despite the compassionate attempts of Rose to bring the patient to the realization that these occurrences are delusions, Rose is distraught as this ultimately fails when the patient slits her own throat.

After witnessing the horrific events of the patient's suicide, Rose once again struggles with the mental health struggles from her youth. She soon begins to question her diagnosis of the deceased patient however, when she disturbingly realizes that various people around her seem to mindlessly grin. Conducting research of her own, Rose is surprised to discover that a series of terrible suicidal deaths have occurred after describing similar stories as Laura had. Determined to find the source of the deathly grin, Rose races against time as she too begins to have grim experiences of her own.

=== Smile 2 (2024) ===
After the financial and critical successes of the first film, in various interviews between November 2022 and December 2023, writer/director Parker Finn stated that he had intentionally left portions of the first movie ambiguous with unresolved plotlines with the hope that he could explore these details in a future sequel.

The filmmaker stated that while he intends that additional installments further explore the backstory of the entity, he will keep its mysterious nature intact. The filmmaker further stated that a follow-up movie would be notably different from the first, saying: "there is still a lot of interesting stuff to explore in the world of Smile. ...I'd want to make sure that there's a new, exciting, fresh way into it that the audience isn't anticipating. I also want to find some new ways to scare them and unnerve them."

In March 2023, Finn signed a first-look contract with Paramount Pictures with the studio wanting to develop additional horror projects with the filmmaker. The following month at CinemaCon 2023, Paramount officially announced that a sequel has been green-lit and is in pre-production, with Parker Finn once again serving as writer/director. By December of the same year, Naomi Scott was announced to be the star the movie. In January 2024, Lukas Gage joined the cast as co-star, while Kyle Gallner was confirmed to be reprising his role as Joel from the first movie; Rosemarie DeWitt will appear in the supporting cast.

Principal photography commenced in New York beginning January 2024 and is expected to complete in March of the same year. In June 2024, the first trailer debuted, following the studio's initial marketing for a fictional pop star character from the movie, with the official title confirmed to be Smile 2. The film was released on October 18, 2024.

=== Smile 3 (TBA) ===
In September 2024, writer/director Parker Finn confirmed plans to continue the series with a third film; stating: "...we've maybe only scooped a single glass of water out of the ocean. ...I think it's really fun to imagine a lineage of Smile movies where each one becomes more off the rails than the previous one." In December, it was reported that Smile 3 was in development, and scheduled to begin principal photography in 2025. In October 2026, David Bruckner was announced as director, with a script written by Nick Antosca and based on the story pitch from Finn; who will serve as a producer. The project will be a joint-venture production between Paramount Pictures, and Temple Hill Entertainment.

== Short film ==
Title	U.S. release date	Director	Screenwriter	Producers
Laura Hasn't Slept	March 25, 2020	Parker Finn		Parker Finn, Sean Dacanay, Tristan Borys, Jonathan Fass & Jessica Bonander

Laura Weaver visits her therapist, and is surprised to find that her usual doctor is out of town. Despite some reservations, she opts to describe a series of recurring horrific dreams she has been experiencing at night that are seeming to also happen during her waking hours, to the therapist who is covering at the practice. Elaborating that the consistent aspect of these occurrences is a man who seems to be following her and creepily grins each time she sees him. As the doctor attempts to reason with her that the dreams are a result of her heightened levels of stress and her active imagination, in a horrified realization Laura recognizes that the doctor is in fact the entity that has been reappearing throughout her dreams, as he smiles menacingly back at her.

== Main cast ==
List indicators

This section includes characters who will appear or have appeared in the franchise in main roles.

- An empty grey cell indicates the character was not in the film, or that the character's official presence has not yet been confirmed.
- ^{A} indicates an appearance through archival footage or audio.
- ^{C} indicates a cameo role.
- ^{O} indicates an older version of the character.
- ^{U} indicates an uncredited appearance.
- ^{V} indicates a voice-only role.
- ^{Y} indicates a younger version of the character.

Character	Short film	Films	
Character	Laura Hasn't Slept	Smile	Smile 2
Character	2020	2022	2024
Principal cast
The Monstrosity	Lew Temple (Note: The Monstrosity takes the form of Dr. Parsons, in Laura Hasn't Slept.)	Marti Matulis Kevin Keppy (Note: The Monstrosity takes on a nightmare form of Rose's mother.)	Trevor Newlin Naomi Scott (Note: The Monstrosity takes on the form of Skye Riley.)
Laura Weaver	Caitlin Stasey	Caitlin Stasey	
Dr. Rose Cotter		Sosie Bacon Meghan Brown Pratt^{Y}	Sosie Bacon^{A}
Joel		Kyle Gallner	Kyle Gallner
Trevor		Jessie T. Usher	
Dr. Morgan Desai		Kal Penn	
Robert Talley		Rob Morgan	
Skye Riley			Naomi Scott
Elizabeth Riley			Rosemarie DeWitt
Joshua			Miles Gutierrez-Riley
Morris			Peter Jacobson
Supporting cast
Dr. Madeline Northcott		Robin Weigert	
Victoria Muñoz		Judy Reyes	
Mrs. Cotter		Dora Kiss	
Holly Cotter		Gillian Zinser	
Greg		Nick Arapoglou	
Carl Renken		Jack Sochet	
Stephanie		Sara Kapner	
Darius Bravo			Raúl Castillo
Gemma			Dylan Gelula
Paul Hudson			Ray Nicholson
Lewis Fregoli			Lukas Gage
Drew Barrymore			Drew Barrymore^{C}

== Additional crew and production details ==
Title	Crew/Detail					
Title	Composer	Cinematographer	Editor	Production companies	Distributing companies	Running time
Laura Hasn't Slept	Rob Himebaugh	Dan Clarke	Tristan Borys	Post Mango; Parker Finn Films	Paramount Home Entertainment	11 mins
Smile	Cristobal Tapia de Veer	Charlie Sarroff	Elliot Greenberg	Paramount Players; Temple Hill Entertainment	Paramount Pictures	115 mins
Smile 2	Cristobal Tapia de Veer	Charlie Sarroff	Elliot Greenberg	Temple Hill Entertainment; Bad Feeling	Paramount Pictures	127 mins

== Reception ==
=== Box office and financial performance ===
Film	Box office gross			Box office ranking		Video sales gross	Budget	Worldwide total net income	Ref.
Film	North America	Other territories	Worldwide	All time North America	All time worldwide	Video sales gross	Budget	Worldwide total net income	Ref.
Smile	$105,935,048	$111,473,465	$217,408,513	#748	#847	$4,088,772	$17,000,000	$200,408,513	
Smile 2	$69,012,586	$69,116,268	$138,128,854	#1,300	#1,406	—N/a	$28,000,000	$109,545,266	
Total	$174,947,634	$180,589,733	$355,537,367			$4,088,772	$45,000,000	$314,580,565	

=== Critical and public response ===
Film	Rotten Tomatoes	Metacritic	CinemaScore
Smile	80% (196 reviews)	68/100 (32 reviews)	B−
Smile 2	86% (213 reviews)	67/100 (37 reviews)	B

== In other media ==
=== Video game ===
In 2024, The Monstrosity was featured as an antagonist during "The Haunting" event, within the online content of video game Call of Duty: Modern Warfare III. Both Skye Riley and The Monstrosity are popular fan-favourite requests for a potential Licensed Chapter DLC in Dead by Daylight.

=== Comic ===
In October 2024, it was announced that Smile: For the Camera, a comic series from IDW Dark, set in the Smile universe, was in the works. In October 2025, it was announced that the series would debut in February 2026. Set in 2005, the series follows a group of aspiring models as they're tormented by The Monstrosity during Fashion Week. In June 2026, it was announced that Any Given Smile, a comic series set to release in September 2026. The series is set during the 1995 American Arena League football championship, following a quarterback caught up in sports betting and a sports journalist investigating a string of deaths. The series will be written by Stephanie Williams.
