= Night Swim =

2024 film by Bryce McGuire

- Theatrical release poster
- Directed by: Bryce McGuire
- Screenplay by: Bryce McGuire
- Story by: Bryce McGuire; Rod Blackhurst
- Based on: Night Swim by: Bryce McGuire; Rod Blackhurst
- Produced by: Jason Blum; James Wan
- Starring: Wyatt Russell; Kerry Condon
- Cinematography: Charlie Sarroff
- Edited by: Jeff McEvoy
- Music by: Mark Korven
- Production companies: Blumhouse Productions; Atomic Monster
- Distributed by: Universal Pictures
- Release date: January 5, 2024
- Running time: 98 minutes
- Country: United States
- Language: English
- Budget: $15 million
- Box office: $54.8 million

Night Swim is a 2024 American supernatural horror film written and directed by Bryce McGuire, and based on the 2014 short film by McGuire and Rod Blackhurst. Starring Wyatt Russell and Kerry Condon, it follows a suburban family who discover that their backyard swimming pool is haunted by a malevolent entity.

Jason Blum and James Wan produced the film under their Blumhouse Productions and Atomic Monster banners respectively, and this marks the first film from the two companies to be released following their merger on January 2, 2024.

Night Swim was released in the United States by Universal Pictures on January 5, 2024. The film received mixed reviews from critics and grossed over $54 million worldwide against a production budget of $15 million.

== Plot ==
In 1992, a young girl, Rebecca Summers, goes out to her family pool one night to retrieve a toy boat belonging to Rebecca's terminally ill brother, Tommy. While Rebecca tries to get the boat, something in the pool pulls Rebecca underwater.

In the present day, the Waller family—Ray, Eve, and 14–15-year-old Izzy and 11-year-old Elliot—are seeking a new, permanent residence after Ray has been forced to retire from his baseball career due to multiple sclerosis. The Waller family decide to purchase a house with a swimming pool in the backyard, especially after hearing that the pool would be good for Ray's condition. Ray scratches his hand while working to clear out the pool in the back yard. When the pool maintenance personnel come to inspect the pool, the pool maintenance personnel reveal that the pool is essentially self-sustaining, taking its water from an underground spring in the area.

The family cat, Cider, goes missing. As Ray spends more time in the pool as part of his therapy, his illness seems to go into remission. However, Eve becomes concerned at the changes she sees in Ray. Izzy and Elliot each get attacked by something in the pool separately. During a pool party, the realtor, Kay, tells Eve about the previous owners' daughter Rebecca Summers drowning in the pool shortly before Ray seemingly forces a child underwater and almost drowns himself. Eve thinks this tragic event is attributed to a side-effect of Ray's illness, but the actual reason is the pool. Eve decides to leave the house but as the Waller family try to leave, Ray's condition gets worse.

With Kay's help, Eve tracks down the Summers family after finding that there was a long history of disappearances in the house. Eve meets with Lucy, Rebecca's mother. Lucy explains that the water that now sustains the pool was once part of an ancient pagan healing spring guarded by a malevolent fairy-like entity. Lucy also explains that in order to benefit from the water's healing properties, someone else must be sacrificed to the spring's guardian. Lucy was compelled to sacrifice Rebecca to the entity to heal Tommy's illness. Eve is horrified to realize that Ray is now being healed by the pool but its guardian will take one of the children as a sacrifice.

Eve returns to the house to find that Ray is being directly controlled by the entity, which traps Elliot in the pool and attempts to kill Izzy. Eve tries to save Elliot while Izzy confronts the entity controlling Ray. Eve manages to retrieve an unconscious Elliot, and is guided to the surface of the pool by Rebecca's spirit. Izzy hits Ray with a baseball bat and Ray regains control of himself. As Ray is freed from the Entity, Elliot is possessed. To stop the entity from attacking his children, Ray sacrifices himself and the entity vanishes.

Deciding to remain in the house so that no one else falls victim to the entity, Eve, Izzy and Elliot make arrangements for the pool to be filled in, to stop such a thing ever happening again.

== Cast ==
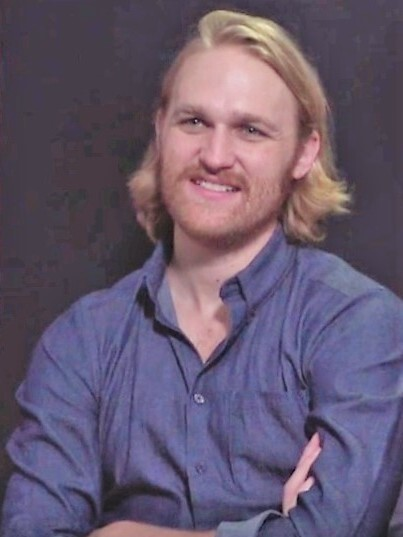
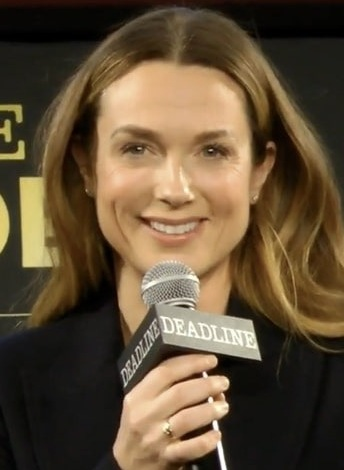
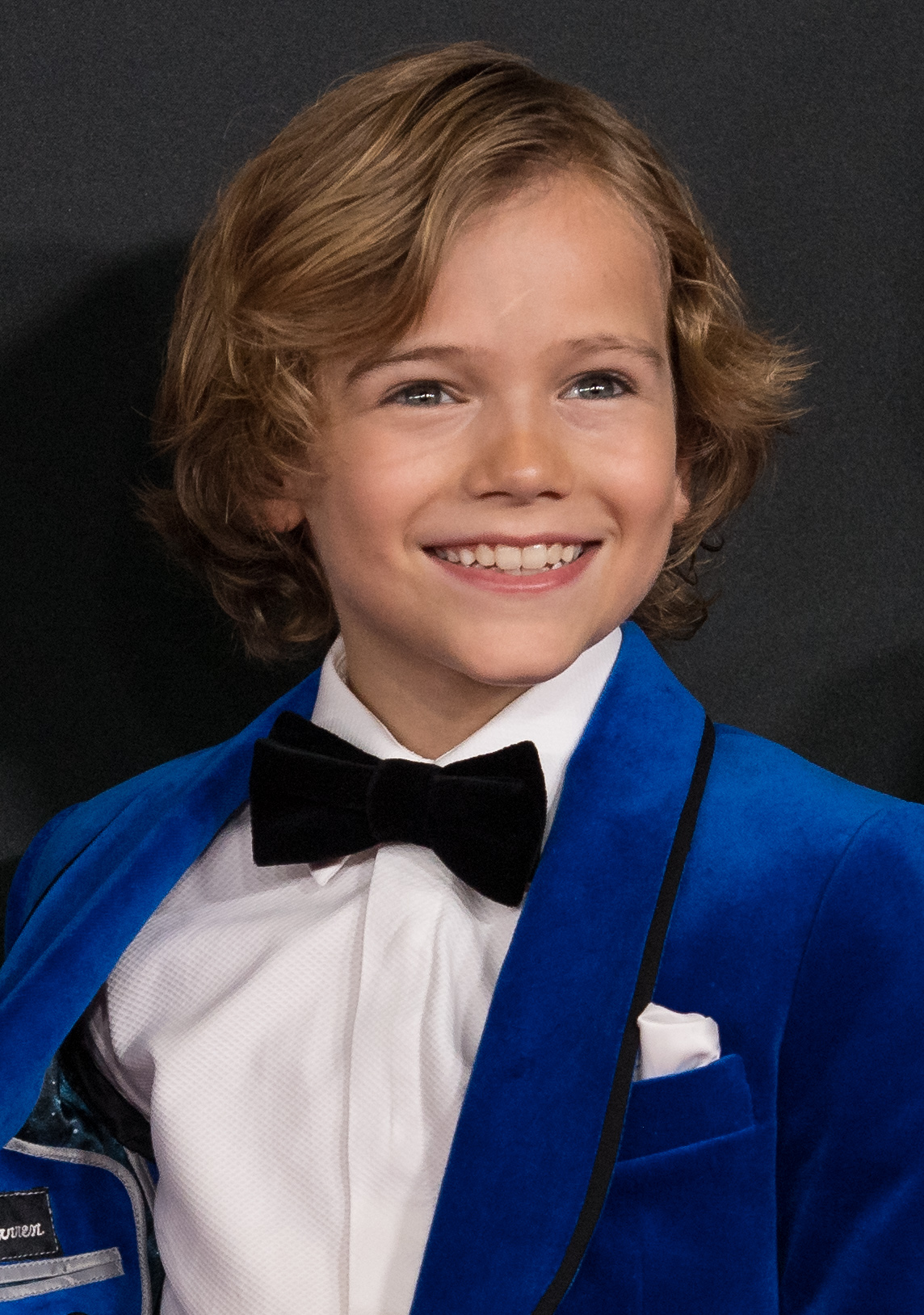
The film stars Wyatt Russell, Kerry Condon, and Gavin Warren.
- Wyatt Russell as Ray Waller
- Kerry Condon as Eve Waller
- Amélie Hoeferle as Izzy Waller, Ray and Eve's teenage daughter
- Gavin Warren as Elliot Waller, Ray and Eve's younger son
- Jodi Long as Lucy Summers
- Ayazhan Dalabayeva as Rebecca Summers
- Nancy Lenehan as Kay
- Eddie Martinez as Coach E
- Elijah J. Roberts as Ronin
- Rahnuma Panthaky as Dr. Sridhar
- Ben Sinclair as pool tech
- Ellie Araiza as Angel

== Production ==
=== Proof-of-concept origins ===
External videos
- The original 2014 short film which served as the proof-of-concept for the feature version via YouTube

The film's origins go back to 2014, when Bryce McGuire wrote and directed his low-budget five-minute short film in collaboration with his friend Rod Blackhurst, which he filmed in the backyard of musician Michelle Branch. It starred Megalyn Echikunwoke in the lead role, which would inspire the character of Izzy Waller in the feature version. McGuire cited Blumhouse's own films, as well as other films such as Poltergeist (1982), Creature from the Black Lagoon (1954), Jaws (1975), Christine (1983), The Night of the Hunter (1955) and The Abyss (1989) as the film's sources of inspiration. He also described the film's story as semi-autobiographical in connection to his childhood and adolescence, saying "Growing up in Florida, surrounded by ocean on three sides, in a climate that can only really be survived by partaking in water ritual, knowing friends who drowned, hurricanes that flooded homes, boating accidents, shark attacks, you come to have a kind of fear and reverence for the water ... I saw that movie [Jaws] when I was 10 years old. We had a swimming pool at the time, and I remember treading water by myself at night when my younger brother turned the lights out. And even though I knew the pool was only 9 feet deep and 18 feet wide, I was certain beyond any doubt that the water was an abyss and something horrible was rising toward me from the depths". The short film was released on YouTube on October 12, 2014, and went viral, allowing McGuire to break into the film industry as a screenwriter. Judson Scott, executive vice president at Atomic Monster, recommended the short to James Wan, who agreed to purchase the rights for a feature film adaptation.

=== Development ===
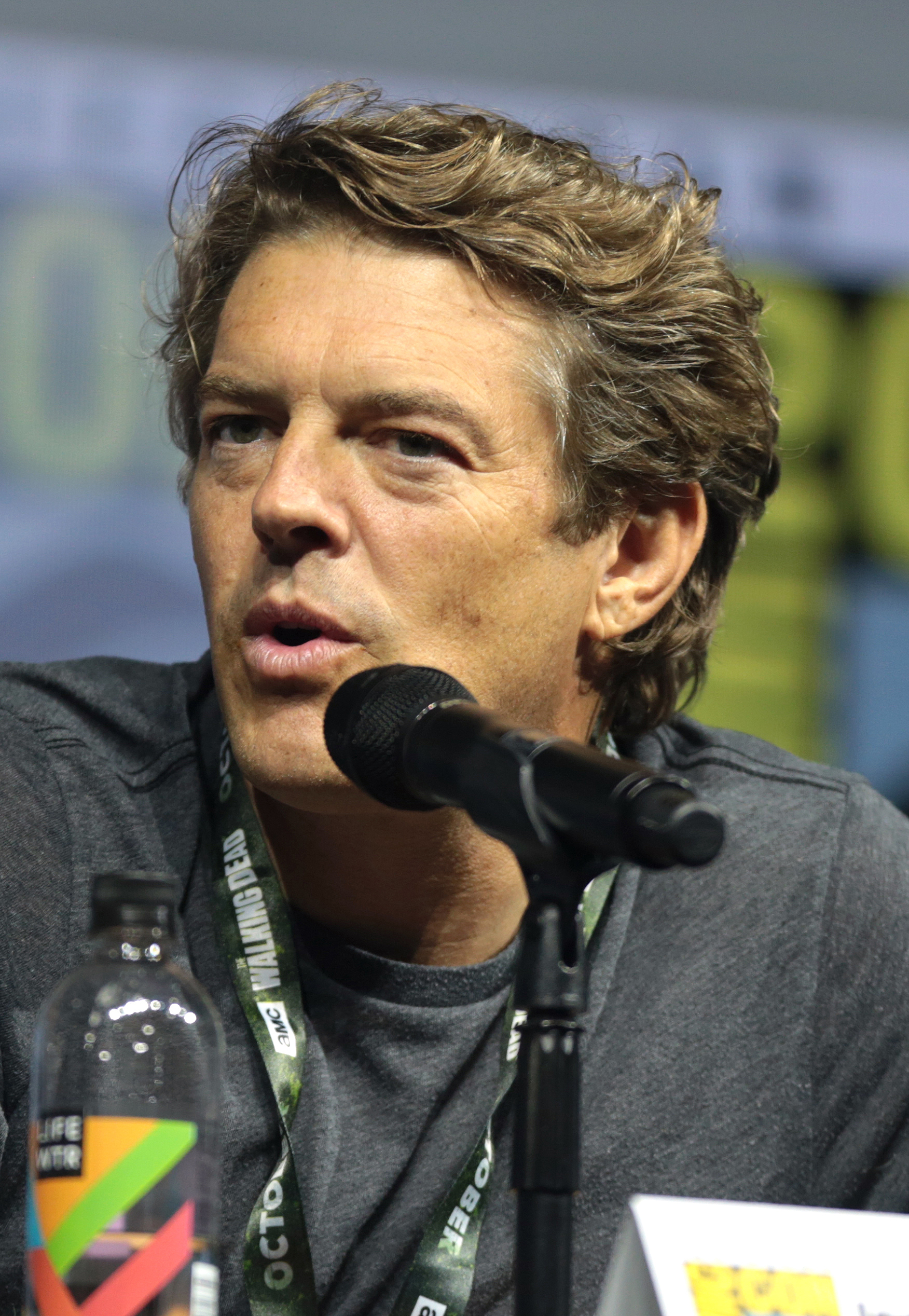
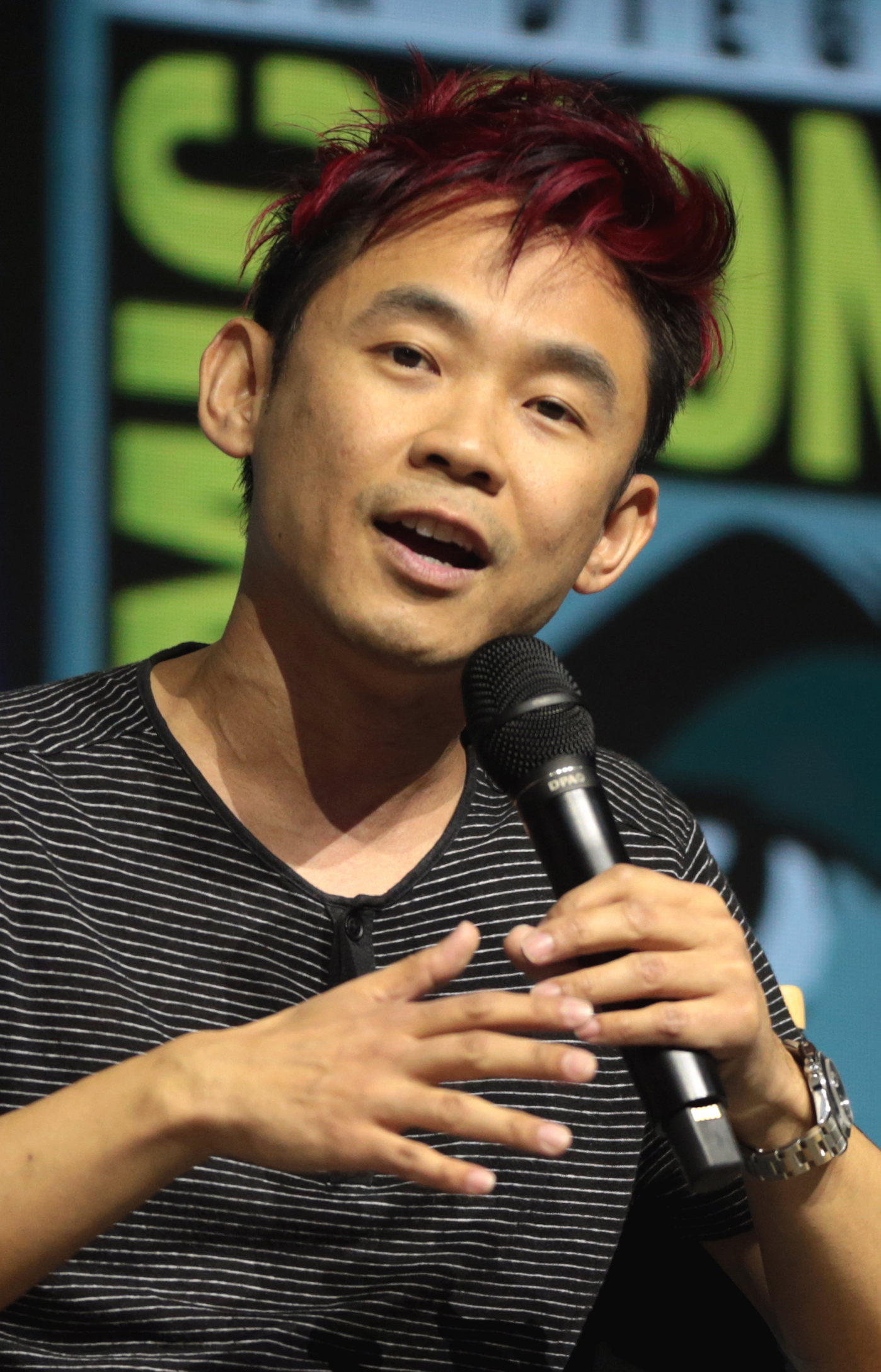
Producers Jason Blum (left) and James Wan (right)

The feature version of Night Swim was reported to be in pre-production in January 2023, following the success of the film M3GAN. McGuire returned to direct from his own screenplay, in which he expanded the plot to add a layer of drama that would drive the story and an emotional layer to the terror that occurs to the characters. This involved adding "an epic, supernatural mythology with a gothic fairytale undercurrent for the story's sinister swimming pool". Wyatt Russell and Kerry Condon were announced to star, with James Wan and Jason Blum producing under their banners, Atomic Monster and Blumhouse Productions, respectively. In April, Amélie Hoeferle, Gavin Warren, Nancy Lenehan and Jodi Long were added to the cast.

=== Filming ===
Principal photography began on April 11, 2023, in Altadena, California and the Los Angeles region, and lasted 34 days. It was shot in an Altadena suburban home with a 9 foot deep backyard pool. Since other shots required a deeper pool, McGuire shot for four days in a 13 foot deep Olympic sized pool in Chatsworth. While a blue screen was employed for some shots, the film did not rely on computer animation to generate a simulation of water, instead filming wet for wet as opposed to dry for wet. In order to intensify the supernatural feel, McGuire and cinematographer Charlie Sarroff used older and wider lenses to make the pool seem as vast as the ocean.

For underwater sequences, McGuire collaborated with cinematographer Ian Takahashi and stunt coordinator Mark Alexander Rayner. McGuire said: "Shooting in water is twice as slow, twice as expensive and twice as dangerous as shooting on land. It was a huge logistical challenge. Everything from keeping the water clear enough to have visibility and having the right flashlights to the amount of time talent could safely hold their breath required specific problem-solving and strategies that you'd never even think about until you're making a movie called Night Swim".

== Music ==
Mark Korven, who also scored Blumhouse's The Black Phone (2022), composed the score for the film. McGuire praised the selection of Korven, saying "...his music is on all my writing playlists and pitched him my vision for the music feeling like it could only come from the water, like some drowned choir rising from the depths, and he was in. He is such a sweet and gifted dude. Only Mark could create sounds this strange and chilling". To reflect the film's influences, McGuire incorporated pop songs from the 1980s to the soundtrack, such as having the character of Ray Waller have a thing for 80s metal to have him feel like he's drawn to the past.

=== Track listing ===
No.	Title	Length
1.	"Opening"	2:50
2.	"Ray's Fall"	1:19
3.	"Nostalgia"	1:58
4.	"Pool Scare Healing"	3:08
5.	"Elliot Swims"	2:13
6.	"Marco Polo"	1:21
7.	"He Won't Let Go"	3:19
8.	"The Deep Water"	1:45
9.	"Eve and Ray Fight"	1:10
10.	"The Night You Were Born"	1:05
11.	"Kids Have Seen Things"	5:22
12.	"Saving Elliott"	6:31
13.	"Shown the Way"	2:16
14.	"Don't Look Back"	2:49
15.	"Ending"	2:05
Total length:		39:11

== Release ==
Night Swim was released by Universal Pictures in the United States on January 5, 2024. The film was originally scheduled for January 19, 2024. It was released on digital platforms on January 23, 2024.

== Reception ==
=== Box office ===
Night Swim grossed $32.5 million in the United States and Canada, and $22.3 million in other territories, for a worldwide total of $54.8 million. In the United States and Canada, Night Swim was projected to gross $9–11 million from 3,250 theaters in its opening weekend. The film made $5.2 million on its first day, including $1.45 million from Thursday night previews. It went on to debut to $12 million, finishing second behind holdover Wonka. In its second weekend, the film dropped 60% to $4.7 million, finishing in seventh.

=== Critical response ===
On the review aggregator website Rotten Tomatoes, 19% of 181 critics' reviews are positive, with an average rating of 4.3/10. The website's consensus reads: "Despite a promising start and a handful of solid scares, Night Swim is undone by a premise that just isn't strong enough to support a feature-length film." Metacritic, which uses a weighted average, assigned the film a score of 43 out of 100, based on 32 critics, indicating "mixed or average" reviews. Audiences polled by CinemaScore gave the film an average grade of "C" on an A+ to F scale, while PostTrak reported 45% of filmgoers gave it a positive score, with 26% saying they would definitely recommend the film.

Owen Gleiberman of Variety said audiences are never "immersed in the movie's terror", and wrote: "But now, opening in the same junkyard weekend slot, we have another Blumhouse production, Night Swim, which restores a certain order to the cinematic universe by being as tepid and unscary as a proper early-in-January movie should be". Frank Scheck of The Hollywood Reporter called the film "the shallow end of the horror-film pool" and said "despite the filmmaker's best efforts to drum up suspense via the usual jump scares, Night Swim turns out to be just as silly as it sounds". Toronto Star's Peter Howell gave a score of two out of four, saying the short story was superior: "For the most part, though, this feature version of Night Swim further demonstrates the truism that longer is rarely better when it comes to movies. The original was short, sharp and shocking".

Matthew Monagle, writing for The Austin Chronicle, gave the film a score of three out of five: "It may be damning with faint praise to describe Night Swim as a solid movie, but horror fans know just how dark and deep the bottoms of their genre can be. We'll take what McGuire has to offer every day of the week". Alissa Wilkinson of The New York Times gave a positive review. She wrote that the third act's goofiness undermined the "emotional resonance it's going for", but ended the review with, "For a winter horror release — typically a great time to go to the movie theater, munch popcorn and get your pants scared off — it does the job". A further positive review came from Chris Vogner in Rolling Stone, who described it as "...a bizarrely intriguing swimming pool horror film".
