= APB (TV series) =

2017 American police procedural drama television series

- Genre: Drama; Police procedural
- Created by: David Slack
- Based on: "Who Runs the Streets of New Orleans?" by David Amsden
- Developed by: Matt Nix
- Starring: Justin Kirk; Natalie Martinez; Caitlin Stasey; Taylor Handley; Ernie Hudson
- Composers: Jon Ehrlich; Jason Derlatka
- Country of origin: United States
- Original language: English
- No. of seasons: 1
- No. of episodes: 12

Production
- Executive producers: Matt Nix; Robert Friedman; Todd Hoffman; Dennis Kim; David Slack; Len Wiseman; Trey Callaway
- Producer: Margot Lulick
- Production location: Chicago, Illinois
- Cinematography: Glenn Keenan; Bart Tau
- Editors: Andrew Coutts; Brandon Lott; Jimmy Hill; Pietro Cecchini
- Running time: 43 minutes
- Production companies: Bungalow Media + Entertainment; Sketch Films; Flying Glass of Milk Productions; 20th Century Fox Television

Original release
- Network: Fox
- Release: February 6 – April 24, 2017

APB (short for "all-points-bulletin") is an American procedural drama that aired on Fox from February 6, to April 24, 2017. A first trailer was released on May 16, 2016.

On May 11, 2017, Fox cancelled the series after one season.

== Plot ==
A tech billionaire makes a deal to purchase a Chicago Police district and equip it with cutting-edge technology, after witnessing the violent murder of a close friend and his company's CFO and the ineffectiveness of the police dealing with it. The story is loosely based on the 2015 New York Times Magazine article "Who Runs the Streets of New Orleans?" by David Amsden.

== Cast ==
=== Main ===
- Justin Kirk as Gideon Reeves. Founder of a multibillion-dollar company, Reeves Industries and a genius engineer. He is the leader of the 13th district.
- Natalie Martinez as Detective Theresa Murphy. Detective at the 13th District of Chicago Police Department.
- Caitlin Stasey as Ada Hamilton. CTO of Reeves Industries and a former hacker.
- Taylor Handley as Officer Roderick Brandt. Police officer at the 13th District of Chicago and partner of Tasha Goss.
- Daniel MacPherson as Scott Murphy. Head of the mayor's task force and ex-husband of Theresa Murphy.
- Ernie Hudson as Sergeant/Captain Ned Conrad. Police captain in charge of the 13th District of Chicago police department.
- Tamberla Perry as Officer Tasha Goss. Police officer at the 13th District of Chicago and partner of Roderick Brandt.

=== Recurring ===
- Abraham Benrubi as Pete McCann. Engineer working at Reeves Industries and former wrestler
- Bryant Romo as Officer Jimmy Reyes. Rookie police officer at the 13th District of Chicago and partner of Geoff Cobb.
- William Smillie as Officer Geoff Cobb. Police officer at the 13th District of Chicago and partner of Jimmy Reyes.
- Nestor Serrano as Mayor Michael Salgado. Mayor of Chicago.
- Kim Raver as Lauren Fitch. CEO of Reeves Industries and girlfriend of Gideon Reeves.
- Ty Olwin as Danny Ragabi (DV8). Genius hacker and former friend/classmate of Ada Hamilton. Who become the main antagonist in the series.
- Demetria Thomas as Sergeant Bernadette 'Bernie' Charles. Police sergeant at the 13th District of Chicago.
- Adam Mengerink as CPD Officer from District 13.

== Production ==
=== Development ===
Fox ordered the pilot of David Slack's police procedural about a tech billionaire who purchases a troubled police precinct. Matt Nix was hired to take over as showrunner on March 24, 2016.

=== Casting ===
On February 12, 2016, Natalie Martinez was cast as Theresa Murphy. On February 22, 2016, Caitlin Stasey was cast as Ada Hamilton. On March 1, 2016, Taylor Handley was cast as Officer Roderick Brandt. On March 11, 2016, Justin Kirk and Eric Winter were cast as Gideon Reeves and Sgt. Tom Murphy respectively. On March 15, 2016, Ernie Hudson was cast as Capt. Ed Conrad.

=== Filming ===
Filming was temporarily shut down when Slack left the show over creative differences sometime before March 25, 2016, as Nix was set in charge. Fox announced that season one of the show would be shot in Chicago on May 11, 2016, and shortly thereafter, Trey Callaway was announced as co-showrunner of the series with Nix.

== Episodes ==
No.	Title	Directed by	Written by	Original release date	Prod. code	US viewers (millions)
1	"Hard Reset"	Len Wiseman	Story by : David Slack; Teleplay by : David Slack & Matt Nix	February 6, 2017	1AZS01	6.10
After witnessing the murder of Elliot Sully, his CFO and friend, genius billionaire Gideon Reeves of Reeves Industries makes a proposal and deal with the mayor to get the troubled Chicago Police 13th District and upgrades it with his company's latest technology, notably by creating the APB app that allows citizens to immediately alert the police to a crime, bulletproof cars and improved weaponry. With the aid of patrol cop Officer Theresa Murphy, Reeves also sets out to bring justice to his friend by finding his killer. Technologies: APB mobile app, quadcopter, electroshock weapon
2	"Personal Matters"	Duane Clark	Trey Callaway & Matt Nix	February 13, 2017	1AZS02	4.53
Newly promoted Murphy gets her first case as a detective with Gideon on a ride-along. They run into a pharmacy robbery and a young girl gets seriously injured while they were attempting to chase down the robber. Gideon modifies the police force's motorcycles to go faster in order to outpace and capture the thief, who happens to be a race car driver by profession. Later, Detective Murphy finds out that her ex-husband, Scott, is head of the mayor's task force to take down Gideon's plans for the 13th District. Technologies: Motorcycles with built-in spike strip
3	"Hate of Comrades"	Oz Scott	Tony Camerino	February 20, 2017	1AZS04	3.75
The 13th District responds to a call from Murphy's friend, Linc, a retired cop turned security guard who used the APB app before he was killed by five jewelry thieves armed with AR-15s. When they capture one suspect who doesn't give up any information, Gideon redesigns a chair that uses biometric feedback sensors to measure stress levels and tests it in the interrogation room. The jewelry store robbery is discovered to be the first step in a robbery of an armored truck full of money. This is later averted when the bomb that the robbers were carrying detonated thanks to a hacker friend of Ada's doing her a favor, unbeknownst to Gideon and the police force. Technologies: Polygraph (via biometric feedback sensors in a chair)
4	"Signal Loss"	Ami Canaan Mann	Krystal Houghton Ziv	February 27, 2017	1AZS03	3.36
When Brandt goes undercover to collar an illegal weapons dealer (Tim Griffin) who has been supplying armor-piercing bullets to the drug dealing community, a problem arises with how to get a wire into the meeting. Gideon proposes they use a material embedded with extremely fine wiring to fabricate a jacket, thus making the entire jacket a transmitter, though not without some restrictions. Meanwhile, Murphy's ex-husband Scott interviews Officer Reyes, who was shot during one of Gideon's first days running the 13th, in an attempt to take down Gideon's plans for 13th. Technologies: Smart fabric jacket
5	"Above & Beyond"	John Putch	Christal Henry	March 6, 2017	1AZS05	3.53
A fellow MIT grad goes to great lengths to get a meeting with Gideon, hoping that he and the officers of the 13th can take down the people dealing a dangerous new synthetic drug that has harmed his daughter. Things get complicated when the man tries to take the law into his own hands. Meanwhile, Scott ramps up his investigation into the sketchy procedures used by Gideon and the 13th. Technologies: Currency bill tracking with invisible color
6	"Daddy's Home"	Darnell Martin	Ingrid Escajeda	March 13, 2017	1AZS10	3.25
Gideon's con man father Joe (John Heard) gets in trouble with a mobster and turns to his son for help in exchange for aiding the 13th precinct in their takedown of the crime family. Meanwhile, Brandt and Goss try to collar a highly successful teenage auto thief. Technologies: Car unlocking device
7	"Risky Business"	Craig Siebels	Carly Sotteras	March 20, 2017	1AZS06	2.88
Gideon is the keynote speaker at the Windy City Tech Summit, where he is joined by Lauren (Kim Raver), the CEO of Reeves Industries. While Lauren is concerned that the 13th Precinct is just another one of Gideon's expensive "hobbies", evidence surfaces that Gideon may be the target of a murderer who has already killed once to gain an all-access pass to the summit. Meanwhile, Brandt and Goss deal with a suicidal young man, both divulging secrets in order to save him. Technologies: Holography, QR code, video conference
8	"Fueling Fires"	Eriq La Salle	Trey Callaway & Nick Hawthorne	March 27, 2017	1AZS07	2.79
Lauren presents Gideon with the idea of "APB Prime," a security system they can sell to the broader public, an idea that Lauren wanted Gideon to introduce during the shareholders meeting later on. Meanwhile, Gideon and Murphy attempts to solve a series of unusual arsons that appear to be related to gang wars that turn out to be something completely different, while Gideon struggles with what to say for the shareholders meeting to keep his company profitability. Technologies: Electronic nose in police cars, infrared vision
9	"Last Train to Europa"	Matt Earl Beesley	Matt Pitts	April 3, 2017	1AZS08	2.63
When an FBI informant working within a drug cartel is feared to be dead on a boat sunk in Lake Michigan, Gideon retrieves a $50 million submersible he developed for NASA to explore the wreckage. The dead body aboard turns out to be a cartel member, so now the team must work to keep their informant safe from the wrath of the cartel leader. Gideon struggles with keeping the ownership of his company as the board of directors threatens to vote him out due to his recent extravagant spending on the 13th Precinct and disregard to the company affairs. Meanwhile, Danny Ragabi (Ty Olwin), a hacker from Ada's past now known as DV8, wants to disrupt the work of the 13th Precinct, as he believes Gideon is creating a police state. Technologies: Submersible, self-destructing server, mobile phone tracking, autonomous car
10	"Strange Bedfellows"	Jeffrey Hunt	Mo Masi	April 10, 2017	1AZS09	2.86
A serial rapist attacks Captain Conrad's old neighborhood and the drug dealer now running the neighborhood wants to dole out his own brand of justice. With the neighborhood community not cooperating with the police, Conrad, Murphy, and Gideon are stuck with collaborating with the drug dealer to find ways they can work together to expose and collar the rapist. Elsewhere, Ada works against the clock to protect herself and the 13th from DV8's schemes. Technologies: Acoustic source localization, van Eck phreaking, laser cutting, virtual reality
11	"Pandora's Box"	Guy Norman Bee	Matt Nix & Jorge Rivera	April 17, 2017	1AZS11	2.73
Despite Ada's previous threats, DV8 takes on Gideon and the 13th, with the intention to expose Gideon's secrets. Fearing for Gideon's safety, Conrad sends him home with Murphy. While the 13th is dealing with DV8's terrorist bombings throughout the Precinct, Murphy and Gideon are ambushed by another set of DV8's men, forcing them to retreat into Gideon's secret lab which is hiding a secret project. Technologies: Remote weapon station, home automation
12	"Ricochet"	Duane Clark	Trey Callaway & Matt Nix	April 24, 2017	1AZS12	2.72
Making use of the opportunity, the mayor blames Gideon for the recent terrorist attacks and threatens to disband the 13th. Meanwhile, DV8 reveals himself and prompts the 13th to find him. While the 13th attempts to locate DV8, DV8 continues to use his technological skills to disrupt the city. After DV8's assassination attempt on Gideon fails, Gideon and Murphy learn that DV8 has targeted city hall and race the clock in an attempt to save the mayor's life. Technologies: Anti-Drone jammer, taser protection suit

== Broadcast ==
Internationally, the series premiered in Australia on FOX8 on February 16, 2017. In New Zealand, it debuted on February 27 on TV One.

== Home media release ==
Name	DVD Release	Discs
APB: The Complete Series	January 15, 2019	3

== Reception ==
The review aggregator website Rotten Tomatoes reported a 35% approval rating with a 4.46/10 out of 20 reviews. The website's consensus reads, "APB's reliance on high-tech gadgets at the expense of high-stakes drama makes it a cutting-edge police procedural not worth watching." Also, the review aggregator website Metacritic gave the series "mixed or average reviews" with a score of 45 (out of 100) based on 18 critics.

=== Ratings ===
Viewership and ratings per episode of APB
No.	Title	Air date	Rating/share (18–49)	Viewers (millions)	DVR (18–49)	DVR viewers (millions)	Total (18–49)	Total viewers (millions)
1	"Hard Reset"	February 6, 2017	1.5/5	6.10	0.7	2.42	2.2	8.52
2	"Personal Matters"	February 13, 2017	1.0/4	4.53	—N/a	—N/a	—N/a	—N/a
3	"Hate of Comrades"	February 20, 2017	0.8/3	3.75	—N/a	1.99	—N/a	5.74
4	"Signal Loss"	February 27, 2017	0.8/3	3.36	—N/a	—N/a	—N/a	—N/a
5	"Above & Beyond"	March 6, 2017	0.8/3	3.53	0.5	1.82	1.3	5.25
6	"Daddy's Home"	March 13, 2017	0.7/3	3.25	0.5	1.74	1.2	5.00
7	"Risky Business"	March 20, 2017	0.7/2	2.88	—N/a	1.73	—N/a	4.61
8	"Fueling Fires"	March 27, 2017	0.6/2	2.79	0.4	1.57	1.0	4.35
9	"Last Train to Europa"	April 3, 2017	0.6/2	2.63	—N/a	1.46	—N/a	4.09
10	"Strange Bedfellows"	April 10, 2017	0.6/2	2.86	0.4	1.50	1.0	4.36
11	"Pandora's Box"	April 17, 2017	0.6/2	2.73	0.4	1.53	1.0	4.25
12	"Ricochet"	April 24, 2017	0.7/3	2.72	TBD	TBD	TBD	TBD

== See also ==
- COPS (animated TV series)
