= Possession (2027 film) =

Upcoming film by Parker Finn

- Directed by: Parker Finn
- Written by: Parker Finn
- Based on: Possession by Andrzej Żuławski
- Produced by: Parker Finn; Jonathan Fass; Roy Lee; Andrew Childs; Robert Pattinson
- Starring: Margaret Qualley; Callum Turner; Diego Calva; Paul Dano
- Cinematography: Charlie Sarroff
- Production companies: Icki Eneo Arlo; Bad Feeling; Vertigo Entertainment
- Distributed by: Paramount Pictures
- Release date: June 11, 2027
- Country: United States
- Language: English

Possession is an upcoming American psychological horror film written, produced and directed by Parker Finn that serves as a remake of the 1981 film by Andrzej Żuławski. It stars Margaret Qualley, Callum Turner, Diego Calva, and Paul Dano.

Possession is scheduled to be released in the United States by Paramount Pictures on June 11, 2027.

== Cast ==
- Margaret Qualley
- Callum Turner
- Paul Dano
- Diego Calva
- Madeline Brewer
- Emory Cohen
- Nicholas Alexander Chavez

== Production ==
In June 2024, it was reported that Parker Finn would produce, write and direct a remake of the psychological supernatural horror film Possession (1981), with a bidding war breaking out among A24, Netflix, Paramount Pictures, Sony Pictures and Warner Bros. Pictures. Robert Pattinson would produce the film through his production banner Icki Eneo Arlo and was speculated for the lead role but ultimately remained as a producer only on the project. In July, it was revealed that Paramount would distribute the film.

In April 2026, Margaret Qualley and Callum Turner were cast in the lead roles. In June, Paul Dano joined the cast. In July, Diego Calva, Madeline Brewer, Emory Cohen and Nicholas Alexander Chavez joined the cast.

Filming began in New Jersey in July 2026, under the working title The Bureaucrat.

== Release ==
Possession is scheduled to be released in the United States by Paramount Pictures on June 11, 2027.
