= Dora Kiss =

Hungarian actress, tennis player

- Born: May 22, 1986 (age 40); Budapest, Hungary
- Occupations: Actress; tennis player
- Years active: 2010–present

Dora Kiss is a Hungarian actress and former tennis player. She is best known for playing Rose's mother in the horror film Smile (2022).

== Early life ==
Kiss was born in Budapest, Hungary on May 22 1986to Lazslo Kiss and Katalin Pelczer. She participated in the European Junior Championships in Tennis. She attended the Csik Ferenc Elementary School and High School.

== Career ==
Kiss was a professional tennis player who received a scholarship from California State University. She moved to Alhambra, California which she loves and says the people are very friendly. Despite loving tennis she always knew acting was her passion. Her professional record when she retired was 34 wins and 44 losses with her highest ranking being 1054 which she achieved on May 9 2005. She studied acting in college. One of her teachers was a member of The Actors' Gang founded by Shawshank Redemption star Tim Robbins. She was inspired after watching a version of the play Our Town at her university. When she applied for the group it started out with thirty people but ended up being just four. As her English was improving, she worked in a local restaurant. She gained worldwide fame for portraying the mother in the horror film Smile. She is also known for appearing in the drama miniseries Pam & Tommy.

== Personal life ==
She loves being the center of attention which she thinks she got from her grandfather who was a lawyer but also sang and played the piano. When visiting Hungary she struggles with her English when she returns to the states. Her mother is a Hungarian language teacher while she calls her sister a bilingual genius. She is often mistaken as being a Brazilian. She hopes to make a movie in Hungary before she dies.

== Filmography ==
=== Film ===
Year	Title	Role	Notes
2010	Pan American	Angela	
2010	Eye Wide Open	Nanny	Short
2013	Monty	Lady Macbeth	Short
2015	Methe	Kate	Short
2016	Faith Healer	Mary	Short
2019	Lost Angeles	Woman	
2021	KZ 0 2.0	Woman	Short
2021	Bitter Hope	Leana	Short
2022	Smile	Mom	
2025	Sorry, My Cat is Sick	Nurse Rachel	

=== Television ===
Year	Title	Role	Notes
2017-2018	Lifelike	Indigo	6 episodes
2022	Pam & Tommy	Wife	Episode; Seattle
2023	The Idol	Theresa	Episode; Stars Belong to the World
