= Laura Hasn't Slept =

2020 short film by Parker Finn

- Directed by: Parker Finn
- Written by: Parker Finn
- Produced by: Jessica Bonander; Tristan Borys; Sean Dacanay; Jonathan Fass; Parker Finn
- Starring: Caitlin Stasey; Lew Temple
- Cinematography: Dan Clarke
- Edited by: Tristan Borys
- Music by: Rob Himebaugh
- Production companies: Post Mango; Parker Finn Films
- Distributed by: Paramount Home Entertainment
- Release date: March 25, 2020 (SXSW)
- Running time: 11 minutes
- Country: United States
- Language: English
- Budget: $30,000

Laura Hasn't Slept is a 2020 American supernatural psychological horror short film written, co-produced, and directed by Parker Finn. The film stars Caitlin Stasey and Lew Temple.

Laura Hasn't Slept acts as the first film and prequel in Finn's feature-length horror series Smile (2022), in which Stasey briefly reprised her role. It was subsequently followed by a franchise of the same name.

== Plot ==
Laura Weaver sees her therapist, Dr. Parsons, and tells him about a recurring nightmare in which a sinister figure constantly smiles at her while taking the appearance of different people, resulting in her developing a fear of sleeping.

Soon, Laura discovers that she is currently in one of the nightmares when Parson questions why she is at his office, and whether they have even met before. Parsons' office begins to decay as he smiles at Laura, and she attempts to leave, only to find that there is a brick wall behind the door. Parson further morphs into the nightmare figure that wants to force Laura to look at its "true face". She refuses to look, covering her face, but looks around the office again when she believes that the monster has gone; however, it appears in front of her, causing her to scream while ripping off her own face.

== Cast ==
- Caitlin Stasey as Laura Weaver
- Lew Temple as Dr. Parsons

== Release ==
The film was screened at the SXSW Film Festival. It was made of a budget of $30,000. Following the success of Smile, it was released on YouTube in November 2022.

== Reception ==
Nightmarish Conjurings does "not recommend the film if you're having problems sleeping". Morbidly Beautiful scored it 4.5 out of 5.
