= Kindred Spirits (2019 film) =

- Directed by: Lucky McKee
- Written by: Chris Sivertson
- Starring: Thora Birch; Caitlin Stasey; Macon Blair
- Release date: 16 June 2019
- Running time: 90 minutes
- Country: United States
- Language: English

Kindred Spirits is a 2019 American horror mystery thriller film written by Chris Sivertson, directed by Lucky McKee and starring Thora Birch, Caitlin Stasey and Macon Blair.

== Plot ==
A woman will stop at nothing to remove everyone from her beloved elder sister's life so she can finally have her sister all to herself.

== Cast ==
- Thora Birch as Chloe
- Caitlin Stasey as Sadie
- Macon Blair as Alex
- Sasha Frolova as Nicole
- Shonagh Smith as Shay
- Isai Torres as Derek
- Olivia Rose Lasell as Young Nicole
- Valeria Jauregui as Young Sadie
- Liam Booth as Kenny
- Audrey Gerthoffer as Serena
- Chelsea Woods as Sales Lady
- Bruce Bennett as Townsperson (uncredited)
- Brent A. Riggs

== Release ==
The film premiered at the Cinepocalypse Film Festival in Chicago on June 16, 2019.

== Reception ==
The film has a 90% rating on Rotten Tomatoes based on 10 reviews. Lorry Kikta of Film Threat awarded the film a 7 out of 10. Nick Allen of RogerEbert.com gave the film a negative review, calling it a "dull thriller."
