= Pink Skies Ahead =

American comedy-drama film

- Film poster
- Directed by: Kelly Oxford
- Written by: Kelly Oxford
- Produced by: Greg Silverman; Lisa Zambri; Adam Hendricks; Greg Gilreath
- Starring: Jessica Barden; Marcia Gay Harden; Michael McKean; Rosa Salazar; Lewis Pullman; Devon Bostick; Odeya Rush; Evan Ross; Henry Winkler; Mary J. Blige
- Cinematography: Charlie Sarroff
- Edited by: Sarah Beth Shapiro
- Music by: Adrian Galvin; Ariel Loh
- Production companies: Stampede Ventures; Divide/Conquer; Foton Pictures; Glanzrock Productions
- Distributed by: MTV Entertainment Studios
- Release dates: October 18, 2020 (AFI); May 8, 2021 (United States)
- Running time: 94 minutes
- Country: United States
- Language: English
- Budget: $2 million

Pink Skies Ahead is a 2020 American comedy-drama film written and directed by Kelly Oxford in her directorial debut. It stars Jessica Barden, Marcia Gay Harden, Michael McKean, Rosa Salazar, Lewis Pullman, Devon Bostick, Odeya Rush, Evan Ross, Henry Winkler and Mary J. Blige.

The film had its world premiere at AFI Fest on October 18, 2020. It was released on May 8, 2021, by MTV Entertainment Studios.

== Plot ==
In 1998 Los Angeles, Winona lives with her parents, has dropped out of college and works for her father as his secretary. Her relationship with her father Richard and mother Pamela isn't great. Winona’s best friends are Addie and Stephanie. She also has a boyfriend, Frank.

Winona goes out with Addie, Cameron (Addie's boyfriend), Stephanie, and Frank. Frank leaves them to get food and doesn’t return. Upset, Winona considers being done with Frank. Later, they see a group of young men where Winona meets Ben.

One day Winona visits her pediatrician Dr. Cotton due to pain in her armpit which had lasted for a month. Dr. Cotton does an examination of her and determines she may have an anxiety disorder and suggests she visit a therapist. Winona visits therapist, Dr. Monroe. During the session, Dr. Monroe asks her about her relationship with her mother which causes Winona to break down into tears.

Winona begins dating Ben, and he invites her to his place where he lives with his roommate/ex-girlfriend Jen. They are hosting a party for Jen’s mom. Winona accidentally wishes Jen’s mom a happy birthday, which leads to everyone gasping and Ben having to explain to Winona that Jen’s mom had her cancer go into remission a year ago. Winona is humiliated and asks Ben to help sneak her out.

Winona starts to attend group therapy sessions with Dr. Monroe and other people. She doesn’t feel that she needs to be there and sees it as a waste of time.

Pamela and Richard plan to downsize. They ask Winona to move out and find her own place. She is annoyed but decides to start looking for her own place and a job. She applies to her favorite book store, as well as a clothing store. However, when she has to do an interview at the clothing store, Winona begins to suffer a panic attack. In a daze, she grabs lip gloss and applies it before collapsing. The interviewer calls Pamela to get Winona. Winona tells Stephanie about the panic attack, but she appears to have a callous attitude towards it.

At work, Winona realizes she forgot to give her dad a file. She goes to the parking garage and sees Richard leaving with another woman. Thinking he is having an affair, Winona attempts to drive after him, but she gets worried since she only has a learners permit, and she unsuccessfully tries to get a stranger to ride with her. Later, Winona has another attempt at following her dad, but she gets distracted from talking to herself and she rear ends the woman’s car. Richard steps out and isn’t mad, but more concerned when he sees that Winona suffered a minor head injury. She declines to get help from the hospital. Richard explains that the woman is a real estate agent showing him other houses.

Ben takes Winona out on a date. He later invites her to meet his mother Hayley, whom Ben says also has bouts of anxiety attacks. Winona ends up having an uncomfortable conversation with Hayley.

Winona has lunch with her parents, who are talking about the new house they found. Winona is excited to move there but Richard and Pamela make it clear that the place is only for the two of them. Winona gets angry at them and storms off. She later joins Ben and suggests that they move in together since he also wants to move away from Jen, but Ben says that he doesn’t think it will work out between them because he plans to be a doctor and thinks his life is moving in a different direction from Winona’s. She angrily tells him off before deciding to walk home.

When Winona gets home, she begins to suffer another panic attack. It becomes more intense and uncontrollable, and she can’t go into her room without vomiting. Pamela and Richard find Winona in their bedroom crying, where she starts to blame them for why she is like this since they never got her treatment when she needed it, as well as them selling the house and forcing her to move out. They take her to Dr. Cotton, who gives Winona a pill to treat her anxiety. Richard then admits that he once suffered a panic attack after Winona was born, but he and Pamela agree to help Winona get through this.

Winona starts to get her life back on track. She plans to go back to college and writes to her professor on returning back. She also maintains her friendship with Addie and Stephanie.

== Cast ==
- Jessica Barden as Winona
- Marcia Gay Harden as Pamela
- Michael McKean as Richard
- Henry Winkler as Dr. Cotton
- Rosa Salazar as Addie
- Odeya Rush as Stephanie
- Lewis Pullman as Ben
- Devon Bostick as Greg
- Mary J. Blige as Doctor Monroe
- Evan Ross as Cameron
- Melora Walters as Hayley
- Alexandra Paul as Claire
- Jessalyn Wanlim as Joanie
- Jesse Heiman as Kevin
- Leah Knauer as Chelsea

== Production ==
In March 2019, it was announced Jessica Barden had joined the cast of the film, with Kelly Oxford directing from a screenplay she wrote. In June 2019, Marcia Gay Harden, Henry Winkler, Rosa Salazar, Lewis Pullman, Devon Bostick, Mary J. Blige, Michael McKean, Odeya Rush and Evan Ross joined the cast of the film.

Principal photography began in Los Angeles in June 2019.

== Release ==
It was scheduled to have its world premiere at South by Southwest on March 13, 2020. However, the festival was cancelled due to COVID-19 pandemic. The film was still considered for awards through jury selection. It instead had its world premiere at the AFI Fest on October 18, 2020. Prior to, MTV Films acquired distribution rights to the film. It was released on May 8, 2021.

=== Critical response ===
On Rotten Tomatoes, the film holds an approval rating of 82% based on 11 reviews, with an average of 7/10.
