= Dolly (2025 film) =

- Theatrical release poster
- Directed by: Rod Blackhurst
- Written by: Rod Blackhurst; Brandon Weavil
- Based on: Babygirl by Rod Blackhurst
- Produced by: Rod Blackhurst; Joseph C. Grano; Noah Lang; Bryce McGuire; Ross O'Connor; Esteban Sanchez; Isaiah Smallman; Betty Tong
- Starring: Fabianne Therese; Russ Tiller; Eve Blackhurst; Michalina Scorzelli; Kate Cobb; Ethan Suplee; Seann William Scott; Max the Impaler
- Cinematography: Justin Derry
- Edited by: Justin Oakey
- Music by: Nick Bohun
- Production companies: Witchcraft Motion Picture Company; Set Point Entertainment; Grim Discoveries; Gentile Entertainment Group; Monarque Entertainment; Mama Bear Studios
- Distributed by: Independent Film Company; Shudder
- Release dates: September 21, 2025 (Fantastic Fest); March 6, 2026 (United States)
- Running time: 83 minutes
- Country: United States
- Language: English
- Box office: $1.3 million

Dolly is a 2025 American independent slasher film directed, written, and produced by Rod Blackhurst. Based on Blackhurst's 2022 short film, Babygirl, the film stars Fabianne Therese, Russ Tiller, Kate Cobb, Eve Blackhurst, Michalina Scorzelli, Ethan Suplee, Seann William Scott, and Max the Impaler. The plot follows Macy, a young woman who fights for survival in the mountains of Tennessee after she is abducted during a hike by a monstrous figure intent on raising her as its child.

Dolly had its world premiere at the Fantastic Fest on September 21, 2025, and was released theatrically in the United States on March 6, 2026.

== Plot ==
Macy and her boyfriend Chase travel into a remote wooded mountain area in East Tennessee for a hike, where Chase intends to propose. While briefly separated, Chase encounters a large woman wearing a porcelain doll mask as she buries a headless corpse, mourning it. She attacks him with a shovel, shattering his leg and brutally mutilating his jaw before leaving him for dead. Meanwhile, Macy, searching for Chase, crosses paths with the masked woman and is pursued through the forest before being captured.

Macy awakens inside a crib in a nursery within the woman's secluded house. She soon discovers that another man is being held captive in a neighboring room, who urges her to comply with the woman's "game" and search for a key. The masked woman, hereafter referred to as “Dolly,” forces her into disturbing, childlike roleplay, subjecting her to humiliating and abusive treatment in an attempt to remake her into her baby. Elsewhere, Chase regains consciousness in the woods, gravely injured but still alive.

Managing to escape briefly, Macy searches the house for a means of escape and discovers a key hidden in the basement, hanging from a doll whose head has been grotesquely replaced with that of a human, suggesting the fate of a previous victim. Dolly soon recaptures her and punishes her severely, mutilating her ear before later reattaching it after Macy submits to her control.

Feigning compliance, Macy waits until Dolly falls asleep and uses the key to free the captive man. However, he reveals himself to be Dolly's father and holds Macy hostage to lure Dolly so he can escape. When Dolly confronts him, she violently kills him, tearing out his heart.

Hearing Chase calling to her from the woods, Macy escapes through a window and finds him, but Dolly intervenes and finishes killing him. In the ensuing struggle, Macy damages Dolly's mask, briefly revealing a charred face beneath. Using a shovel and the corpse of a previous victim to defend herself, Macy manages to subdue Dolly and flee.

Macy encounters a park ranger, but Dolly suddenly reappears and decapitates him. Macy gets into the ranger's vehicle and runs Dolly over before driving away. As she flees, she places the engagement ring on her finger, laughing and crying hysterically in the aftermath of her ordeal.

== Cast ==
- Fabianne Therese as Macy
- Max the Impaler as Dolly
- Ethan Suplee as Tobe
- Seann William Scott as Chase
- Russ Tiller as Billy
- Eve Blackhurst as Evy
- Michalina Scorzelli as Aunt Sadie
- Kate Cobb as Rachel

== Production ==
By June 2024, principal photography, which took place in the Chattanooga metropolitan area on 16 mm film, wrapped and Fabianne Therese, Seann William Scott, Ethan Suplee, Russ Tiller, Michalina Scorzelli and Max the Impaler were added to the cast of the film. The film is based on Blackhurt's 2022 short film, Babygirl.

== Release ==
Blue Finch Film Releasing acquired the international sales to the film in June 2024. The film first had a market screening for distributors at the TIFF Lightbox on September 6, 2025. The film then had its world premiere at the Fantastic Fest on September 21. The film also premiered at the SLASH Film Festival on September 26, the Stiges Film Festival on October 9, the Telluride Horror Show the following day, the Screamfest Horror Film Festival on October 14, the ToHorror Film Festival on October 25, the Morbido Film Festival on October 31, the FrightFest the following day, the Paris International Fantastic Film Festival on December 15, and the Fantasy Filmfest on January 17, 2026. In November 2025, Independent Film Company and Shudder acquired distribution rights to the film for North America, the UK, Ireland, Australia and New Zealand, and released it theatrically in the United States on March 6, 2026. Vertigo Releasing also released the film on the same day in the United Kingdom.

== Reception ==
=== Critical response ===
Metacritic review
breakdown (unweighted)

Positive
2 (29%)
Mixed
4 (57%)
Negative
1 (14%)

On the review aggregator website Rotten Tomatoes, 63% of 80 critics' reviews are positive. The website's consensus reads: "Packed with grim, relentless set pieces and gleefully excessive gore, Dolly may not reinvent the slasher wheel, but it spins it with such chaotic energy that it becomes an unapologetically brutal celebration of horror's most unhinged extremes." On Metacritic, the film has a weighted average score of 46 out of 100, based on seven reviews, indicating "generally mixed or average" reviews.
