= Baghead (2023 film) =

British horror film

- Directed by: Alberto Corredor
- Screenplay by: Christina Pamies; Bryce McGuire
- Starring: Freya Allan; Peter Mullan; Anne Müller; Ruby Barker; Jeremy Irvine
- Cinematography: Cale Finot
- Edited by: Jeff Betancourt
- Music by: Suvi-Eeva Äikäs
- Production companies: Studio Babelsberg; StudioCanal; The Picture Company
- Distributed by: StudioCanal (United Kingdom and Germany); Shudder (United States)
- Release dates: 28 December 2023 (Germany); 24 January 2024 (UK)
- Running time: 94 minutes
- Countries: United Kingdom; Germany; United States
- Language: English

Baghead is a 2023 horror film directed by Alberto Corredor and written by Christina Pamies and Bryce McGuire. It stars Freya Allan, Peter Mullan, Anne Müller, Ruby Barker, and Jeremy Irvine. The film follows a young woman who, after inheriting a pub from her late father, discovers an entity that can help people speak to the dead, but at a cost.

== Plot ==
Owen Lark, the owner of the Queen's Head, is approached by Neil, who insists on speaking to a woman. After sending him away, Owen records a video renouncing ownership of the bar and warns future owners of someone living in the basement. After, he enters the basement and douses a woman in flammable liquid. However, the woman gets him to light himself on fire.

Owen's estranged daughter, Iris, takes legal ownership of the bar after Neil offers her €4,000 to visit Baghead, an entity capable of allowing the living to communicate with the dead. Baghead emerges from a hole in the wall, and Neil asks her to speak with his deceased wife, Sarah. Instead, she transforms into Neil's mother and attacks him. Due to her ownership of the bar, Iris is capable of commanding Baghead. Iris and her friend Katie watch Owen's video. He explains that interaction with Baghead must be limited to two minutes and that he abandoned his family to contain her. Katie investigates Otto Vogler, the previous owner of the pub, who committed suicide. During her investigation, she sees a photo of Vogler and Neil. Iris allows Neil to revisit Baghead, but she attacks him again. Iris commands her to stop, and Baghead claims that they are both prisoners. A flashback reveals that Owen was killed by Baghead while he was using her to communicate with Catherine, Iris's mother.

After being unable to track down the solicitor who introduced Iris to the bar, Katie finds an abandoned house linked to Vogler and the solicitor. Iris visits Baghead, who takes the form of Owen. Anguished that Iris is the new owner, he warns of Baghead's invulnerability and begs her not to bring him back again. Iris tries to burn the deed of the pub, but is unable to do so. Katie returns to the pub and visits Baghead, who takes on the form of Vogler. He explains that 400 years ago, an ancient brotherhood burned a young conjurer at the stake. After returning as a vengeful spirit, the brotherhood sealed her in an underground tomb, which was then reopened by the brotherhood to use her power. After members of the brotherhood died, the only guardian against Baghead would be the owner of the pub. Baghead then attacks Katie.

Iris hears Katie's screams and enters the hole in the wall. Inside, she finds Katie's body in a deep warren of corridors carved into the rock. Iris is chased by Baghead before being rescued by Neil. Afterward, Iris seals the hole shut. Neil sedates Iris and speaks to Baghead, explaining that he desired ownership of the building to speak with Sarah at his demand. He attempts to sign the deed, but his signature fades away. Baghead turns into Sarah and reveals that Neil was responsible for her death. Sarah tries to convince Neil to kill Iris so they can be reunited. Neil chases Iris, and after ending up on the roof, he throws her off, killing her. Neil gets Baghead to transform into Iris and explains that he should now be in control of the building. Iris then points out that Neil has brought her back while her name is still on the deed; therefore, as the current owner, Baghead is now in control of herself. She then attacks and kills Neil. It is then revealed that Baghead orchestrated everything in a scheme to free herself.

== Cast ==
* Freya Allan as Iris Lark
- Peter Mullan as Owen Lark
- Anne Müller as Baghead
- Ruby Barker as Katie
- Jeremy Irvine as Neil
- Julika Jenkins as Regina
- Saffron Burrows as Catherine Lark
- Ned Dennehy as The Solicitor
- Svenja Jung as Sarah

== Production ==
The film is directed by Alberto Corredor, expanded from a 2017 short film he made of the same name, written with Lorcan Reilly. The feature-length film is also written by Christina Pamies and Bryce McGuire. The cast is led by Freya Allan, Peter Mullan, Anne Müller, Jeremy Irvine and Ruby Barker. The cast also includes Julika Jenkins, Saffron Burrows, Svenja Young and Ned Dennehy.

== Release ==
The film had a limited theatrical release in January 2024. It became able to stream on Shudder from June 2024.

== Reception ==
On the review aggregator website Rotten Tomatoes, 31% of 32 critics' reviews are positive. The website's consensus reads: "Baghead squanders its intriguing supernatural premise and creepy visuals on thinly drawn characters, convoluted plot mechanics, and uninspired scares." On Metacritic, the film has a weighted average score of 51 out of 100 based on 4 critics, which the site labels as "mixed or average" reviews.

Peter Bradshaw in The Guardian gave the film two stars out of five and said it has "some interesting touches" but felt it could be too easily compared in plot to the Australian 2022 film Talk to Me.

The film's setting in Berlin was also pointed out by some critics. Bradshaw noted that "the original setting has been uncomfortably and bafflingly transplanted to Berlin [...] without ever really explaining why and how a Scottish bloke (Mullan) came to own this 'pub' in Berlin with its English name, The Queen's Head. This creates a layer of clunky inauthenticity which scuppers it almost entirely." Similarly, Anton Bitel of Sight and Sound remarked "Baghead comes with a suitably intangible setting: an eerily depopulated, gothically lit, once divided Berlin where almost no one speaks German."
