= Mark Alexander Rayner =

Australian stunt performer

Mark Rayner (born 13 February 1974) is a stunt coordinator and second unit director from Bells Beach, Australia. He is known for his film work in Mad Max: Fury Road, Underwater, Inception, Baywatch and X-Men: First Class. He won the Screen Actors Guild Award twice.

== Career ==
Rayner began his Hollywood stunt career work on Baywatch in 1998. He has performed stunt work in films including The Dark Knight Rises, Godzilla, The Hunger Games, Happy Death Day, Ouija: Origin of Evil, Pee-wee's Big Holiday, John Carter, Maze Runner: The Scorch Trials, The Signal, Gamer, Inception, Dunkirk, Mad Max: Fury Road, Dolittle, All the Bright Places, Those Who Wish Me Dead, Paranormal Activity: Next of Kin, and Thor.

In 2016, Rayner, directed the second unit for The Tribes of Palos Verdes and joined the Directors Guild of America. He directed the action scenes for the 2019 film Dreamland and the 2020 science fiction horror Underwater.

Rayner won the Screen Actors Guild Award twice for Outstanding Stunt Ensemble Performance in a Motion Picture.
