= Kelly Oxford =

Canadian author (born 1977)

- Born: November 29, 1977 (age 48); Canada
- Occupations: Writer, director
- Children: 3

Kelly Oxford (born November 29, 1977) is a Canadian author, director, screenwriter, and actress.

== Career ==
In 1996, Oxford dropped out of Mount Royal University after one semester. She started blogging as a means of daily productivity and self-publishing. She later worked as a waitress and at a shoe store.

In 2001, Oxford became a full-time stay-at-home mother and began focusing on an anonymous blog. She joined Twitter in 2009, and gained a large following, eventually attracting the attention of celebrities, including Diablo Cody and Roger Ebert, and being contacted by a number of agents. She sold a television script to CBS, to be executive produced by Jessica Alba, based on her life as a mother in Calgary. She then wrote another pilot that was bought by NBC. Neither script has been produced. Oxford moved to Los Angeles in 2012.

In 2013, Oxford published a semi-autobiographical book, Everything Is Perfect When You're a Liar, which became a New York Times bestseller. She appeared on the reality show Candidly Nicole, starring Nicole Richie. Additionally Oxford and Molly McNearney, head writer for Jimmy Kimmel Live!, developed a semi-autobiographical comedy for TV Land in early 2016 that did not air.

On April 18, 2017, Oxford released her second book, When You Find Out the World is Against You: And Other Funny Memories About Awful Moments. While appearing on Jimmy Kimmel Live! as part of the book's launch, she revealed that it was during a kitchen table conversation with Kimmel and his head writer (and wife) McNearney that the segment "Mean Tweets" originated, after she and Kimmel read cruel tweets to each other in a humorous way, trying to outdo each other. In October 2020, her directorial debut Pink Skies Ahead premiered at AFI Fest.

== Personal life ==
Oxford and her husband James Skitmore were together for 17 years, until divorcing in 2016. She has three children. She revealed in 2023 that she had been diagnosed with OCD and ADHD.

== Books ==
- (2013) Everything Is Perfect When You're a Liar (paperback edition 2014, ISBN 978-0062102232)
- (2017) When You Find Out the World is Against You: And Other Funny Memories About Awful Moments (hardcover, ISBN 978-0062322777)

== Film and television ==
- 2014: Sharknado 2: The Second One – actress, Annoyed Woman on Plane
- 2015: Aloha – actress, Military Wife Angela
- 2017: The Disaster Artist – actress, Amy Von Brock
- 2017: Underwater – actress
- 2018: Busy Tonight – writer, 8 episodes
- 2020: Pink Skies Ahead – director; writer
