= Smile (2022 film) =

Film by Parker Finn

- Theatrical release poster
- Directed by: Parker Finn
- Written by: Parker Finn
- Based on: Laura Hasn't Slept by Parker Finn
- Produced by: Marty Bowen; Wyck Godfrey; Isaac Klausner; Robert Salerno
- Starring: Sosie Bacon; Jessie T. Usher; Kyle Gallner; Kal Penn; Rob Morgan
- Cinematography: Charlie Sarroff
- Edited by: Elliot Greenberg
- Music by: Cristobal Tapia de Veer
- Production company: Temple Hill Entertainment; Deathbath Pictures
- Distributed by: Paramount Pictures
- Release dates: September 22, 2022 (Fantastic Fest); September 30, 2022 (United States)
- Running time: 115 minutes
- Country: United States
- Language: English
- Budget: $17 million
- Box office: $217.4 million

Smile is a 2022 American supernatural psychological horror film written and directed by Parker Finn, in his feature directorial debut. A follow-up to Finn's short film Laura Hasn't Slept (2020), it stars Sosie Bacon as a therapist who witnesses the bizarre suicide of a patient, then becomes overwhelmed with increasingly disturbing visions that lead her to believe she is experiencing something supernatural. It also features Jessie T. Usher, Kyle Gallner, Kal Penn, and Rob Morgan, as well as Caitlin Stasey reprising her role from Laura Hasn't Slept.

A feature adaptation of Finn's short was announced in June 2020, and the cast was added in October 2021. Principal photography began that month in New Jersey and ended in November. It was originally set for release on the streaming service Paramount+, but the distributor, Paramount Pictures, released it theatrically after positive test screenings.

Smile premiered at Fantastic Fest on September 22, 2022, and was released in the United States on September 30. It received generally positive reviews and grossed over $217 million worldwide on a budget of $17 million. A sequel without the involvement of Paramount Players, Smile 2, was released in 2024. A third Smile film is currently in development.

== Plot ==
At a psychiatric ward in Newark, New Jersey, therapist Rose Cotter meets a new patient, PhD student Laura Weaver, (Note: Laura is the protagonist of the related short film Laura Hasn't Slept (2020)) who recently witnessed her professor kill himself. Laura claims she is now being terrorized by an invisible entity that only she can see, that appears as various menacing smiling people, and has foretold her death. She begins screaming and choking, prompting Rose to call for help; Laura suddenly calms down and smiles, then fatally slits her own throat in front of a horrified Rose. That night, Rose sees a vision of a smiling Laura standing in the darkness of her kitchen.

The next day, Rose sees another patient named Carl, who smiles in the same way and shouts at her that she is going to die. Rose calls for nurses to restrain Carl, only to realize Carl has been asleep the entire time. Concerned for Rose's mental well-being, her supervisor, Morgan, orders Rose to take a paid week off. Rose's hallucinations rapidly increase in severity, and she visits her former therapist, Madeline, who suggests that Rose's problems stem from her childhood, in which she witnessed her abusive and mentally ill mother die from an overdose. Rose sees a toy train and buys it as a birthday present for Jackson, the son of her older sister Holly. At the party, he unwraps her present to find the corpse of Mustache, Rose's cat, horrifying everyone. Breaking down, Rose sees a guest smiling at her, causing her to fall into a glass coffee table and injure herself. This convinces Rose that she has fallen victim to a curse, although both Holly and her fiancé, Trevor, believe she has inherited her mother's mental health issues.

Upon learning that Laura's professor was smiling at her before his suicide, Rose visits the professor's widow, Victoria, and learns that he had also witnessed a suicide shortly before his. Rose asks her ex-boyfriend Joel, a police detective, to review old police records. They find several cases of people who witnessed someone commit suicide while smiling at them before doing the same to themselves within a week. Joel discovers the sole exception in the chain of suicides: convicted murderer Robert Talley. Rose and Joel visit him in prison, where he claims that the events are caused by an entity that feeds on trauma and that the only way to escape it is to brutally kill someone else in front of a witness to traumatize them, passing the curse to the witness, although Robert screams at them to leave when he realizes that Rose herself is cursed. While Rose contemplates what action to take, she is terrorized by the Entity when it disguises itself as Madeline coming over for a therapy session. Rose drives to her hospital with a knife and tries to murder Carl in front of Morgan, but this is revealed to be a hallucination. Rose wakes up in her car to find Morgan standing outside. He notices the knife, but she speeds away, prompting him to alert the police.

Rose drives to her abandoned family home, believing that the Entity's curse ends if she isolates herself so she cannot pass it on to anyone else. The Entity appears as Rose's mother, and it is revealed that Rose could have saved her mother but chose not to due to fear of her. The Entity transforms into a more demonic version of her mother and attacks Rose, but Rose smashes a lantern into its face, setting it on fire and seemingly killing it. Rose flees the burning house and returns to Joel's apartment, where she confesses her fear of letting people into her life and asks to stay the night. When Joel suddenly smiles at Rose, she realizes this is another vision. In reality, Joel has tracked Rose's phone to her old house and found her outside the abandoned home. Realizing what is about to happen, Rose panics and runs back inside, where the Entity corners her and rips its face off to reveal its true form: a skinless, semi-humanoid monstrosity with multiple sets of smiling jaws. The sight of the Entity's visage causes Rose to fall into a trance, and the Entity possesses her by pulling her mouth open and crawling inside. Joel breaks down the front door and witnesses Rose douse herself with fuel, turn to face him with a menacing smile, strike a match, and set herself on fire, passing the curse on to him.

== Cast ==
- Sosie Bacon as Dr. Rose Cotter, a therapist
- Kyle Gallner as Joel, Rose's ex-boyfriend and a police officer
- Jessie T. Usher as Trevor, Rose's fiancé
- Robin Weigert as Dr. Madeline Northcott, a therapist
- Caitlin Stasey as Laura Weaver, a woman cursed by the Smile Entity
- Kal Penn as Dr. Morgan Desai, Rose's boss
- Rob Morgan as Robert Talley, a survivor of the Smile Entity
- Gillian Zinser as Holly, Rose's sister
- Judy Reyes as Victoria Muñoz
- Jack Sochet as Carl Renken, a patient of Rose
- Nick Arapoglou as Greg, Holly's husband and Rose's brother-in-law
- Matthew Lamb as Jackson, son of Greg and Holly and Rose's nephew
- Perry Strong as Detective Buckley
- Dora Kiss as Rose and Holly's mother
- Sara Kapner as Stephanie, a party guest
- Kevin Keppy as Nightmare Mom, a demonic version of Rose's mother conjured by the Smile Entity
- Marti Matulis as The Monstrosity, the Smile Entity's true form

== Production ==
=== Development and casting ===
In June 2020, Parker Finn was signed on by Paramount Pictures to write and direct a feature-length adaptation of his own short film Laura Hasn't Slept, which saw a desperate young woman seeking the help of her therapist to rid herself of a recurring nightmare. In March of that year, the short film had won the Special Jury Recognition Prize for South by Southwest's Midnight Short category.

In September 2021, the film was announced under the title Something's Wrong with Rose with Sosie Bacon cast as the titular character. The following month, Jessie T. Usher, Kyle Gallner, Rob Morgan, Kal Penn, Judy Reyes, Gillian Zinser, and Caitlin Stasey joined the cast.

=== Filming ===
Principal photography began on October 11, 2021, in New Jersey, including in the city of Hoboken, and wrapped on November 24, 2021. Some filming locations included the Murphy Varnish Lofts, Rutgers New Jersey Medical School in Newark and Lewis Morris Park in Morristown.

Editing and post-production were completed in May 2022. Visual effects was done by the-Artery and was supervised by Yuval Levy and Vico Sharabani, when the film was simply retitled Smile. The film's score was composed by Cristobal Tapia de Veer and featured an obscure musical instrument called the daxophone as the lead instrument. For practical effects, Finn recruited Alec Gillis and Tom Woodruff Jr. of Amalgamated Dynamics, who he described as a major influence in wanting to be a horror filmmaker for their work in films such as Aliens.

== Release ==
=== Theatrical ===
Smile had its world premiere at Fantastic Fest on September 22, 2022, followed by screenings at Beyond Fest on September 27. It was released in the United States on September 30, 2022, by Paramount Pictures. Paramount Pictures President and CEO Brian Robbins said that Smile was originally slated for a streaming-only release on Paramount+, but the studio eventually decided to release the film theatrically because of strong results from test screenings.

=== Home media ===
The film was released for VOD platforms including Paramount+ on November 15, 2022, with a DVD, Blu-ray, and 4K UHD set released on December 13, 2022.

=== Marketing ===
The trailer and poster were released on June 22, 2022. Brad Miska of Bloody Disgusting described the footage as "pretty generic", but said it stood out due to its similarities to Ringu and its remake The Ring. Shania Russell at /Film compared the film to The Ring, It Follows and Truth or Dare and wrote, "It's all very familiar and probably not too hard to imagine how the movie will progress, but the scares will make or break the experience, and based on the trailer, Smile is more than promising." All-in-all, Paramount spent an estimated $50 million promoting the film.

During several Major League Baseball games the weekend before the film's release, a viral marketing stunt occurred, as the studio's marketing team purchased seats behind home plate, with actors smiling maniacally into the camera for the pitcher-batter shot for extended periods of time. Some of the actors wore shirts with the name and logo of the film on the front.

== Reception ==
=== Box office ===
Smile grossed $105.9 million in the United States and Canada, and $111.5 million in other territories, for a total worldwide gross of $217.4 million. Deadline Hollywood calculated the film's net profit as $180 million, accounting for production budgets, marketing, talent participations, and other costs; box office grosses and home media revenues placed it tenth on their list of 2022's "Most Valuable Blockbusters".

In the United States and Canada, Smile was released alongside Bros, and was projected to gross $16–20 million from 3,645 theaters in its opening weekend. The film made $8.2 million on its first day, including $2 million from Thursday night previews. It went on to debut to $22.6 million, topping the box office and slightly overperforming its projections, while being the biggest debut of September 2022. The film made $18.5 million in its sophomore weekend, remaining atop the box office. The 18% second weekend drop was the second-smallest ever for a horror film behind Get Out's 15% in February 2017, and marked the best non-holiday hold of the pandemic era. Although it was dethroned by newcomer Halloween Ends in its third weekend, the film continued to hold well, making $12.6 million. On November 9, 2022, it became only the third R-rated film released in the pandemic era to gross $100 million domestically, as well as becoming the highest-grossing R-rated horror film worldwide during the pandemic.

=== Critical response ===
On the review aggregator website Rotten Tomatoes, the film holds an approval rating of 80% based on 196 reviews, and an average rating of 6.6/10. The site's critical consensus reads: "Deeply creepy visuals and a standout Sosie Bacon further elevate Smile's unsettling exploration of trauma, adding up to the rare feature that satisfyingly expands on a short." On Metacritic, the film has a weighted average score of 68 out of 100, based on 32 critics, indicating "generally favorable reviews". Audiences surveyed by CinemaScore gave the film an average grade of "B–" on an A+ to F scale, while those polled at PostTrak gave it an overall 69% positive score, with 53% saying they would definitely recommend it.

Marisa Mirabal of IndieWire gave the film a grade of B−, noting its plot's similarities to films such as It Follows, The Ring, Oculus and Final Destination. She wrote: "Smile navigates unhealed trauma through a supernatural lens and mischievous juxtaposition, despite feeling like a shadow of other stories", and added that it "delivers a captivating and claustrophobic mental hellscape that will cause one to both grimace and grin." Tasha Robinson of Polygon wrote: "Smile is often a gimmicky, even corny horror movie, packed with so many jump-scares that the sheer pile-on borders on laughable... But no matter how excessively the legitimate scares pile up, they're startling and convincing. The editing and music are impressively tuned for maximum impact whenever the slow-burning tension resolves with an abrupt, ugly surprise. All of which makes Smile an efficient ride, if an unusually unrelenting one."

Katie Rife of RogerEbert.com gave the film 2.5 out of 4 stars, writing: "In padding out the concept from an 11-minute short into a nearly two-hour movie, Smile leans too heavily not only on formulaic mystery plotting, but also on horror themes and imagery lifted from popular hits like The Ring and It Follows." Kevin Maher of The Times wrote: "There are some nice jump scares and Bacon is charismatic but it's achingly derivative and dull", and gave the film 2 out of 5 stars. Jeffrey M. Anderson of Common Sense Media also gave the film 2 out of 5 stars, writing: "The image of a creepy, sinister smile is so primal and so chilling that it might have inspired something truly penetrating, but, sadly, this horror movie is content to fall back on noisy jump scares."

=== Accolades ===
At the 2023 MTV Movie & TV Awards, Smile was nominated for Best Movie and Most Frightened Performance (Bacon). At the 51st Saturn Awards, the film was nominated for Best Horror Film.

== Future ==
=== Short film ===
Laura Hasn't Slept was written and directed by Parker Finn in 2019, and later debuted at South by Southwest in 2020. The positive reception at the film festival resulted in Paramount Pictures commissioning the filmmaker for a feature film adaptation, though it was later revealed that the movie is a continuation of the original story.

The premise follows Laura as she recounts to her therapist a series of horrific dreams and hallucinations where she is being pursued by a smiling man. As she does so, she begins to realize that she is not where she thinks she is, that she is again experiencing an extrasensory episode, and that the counselor she is confiding in is actually the entity that has been tormenting her. While the ending of the short film seems to indicate that the character dies, Laura later appears in Smile where she seeks the help of Dr. Rose Cotter; indicating that the resolution to Laura Hasn't Slept was a continued hallucination. The character ultimately sets in motion the events of the full-length film.

The short movie later received a wide release as a bonus feature on the home video media release of Smile; Paramount marketed the feature as a "Smile original short film". Finn additionally called the short "the origin" of Smile.

=== Sequel ===
Following the release of Smile, during interviews between November and December 2022, writer and director Parker Finn stated that he had intentionally left portions of the first movie ambiguous, with various plotlines unresolved, while expressing interest in exploring those details in a potential sequel film. The filmmaker stated that while additional installments may explore the backstory of the entity, he would like to keep its mysterious nature intact. He noted that a follow-up movie would be notably different from the first, stating that he believed "there is still a lot of interesting stuff to explore in the world of Smile. ... I'd want to make sure that there's a new, exciting, fresh way into it that the audience isn't anticipating. I also want to find some new ways to scare them and unnerve them."

In April 2023, Paramount Pictures officially announced at CinemaCon 2023 that a sequel had been green-lit and was in pre-production, with Parker Finn once again serving as writer and director. In December 2023, Naomi Scott was cast in the leading role. In January 2024, Lukas Gage was added to the cast of the sequel. Kyle Gallner reprised his role as Joel with Rosemarie DeWitt also joining. Smile 2 was released on October 18, 2024.
