= Caitlin Stasey =

Australian actress and singer (born 1990)

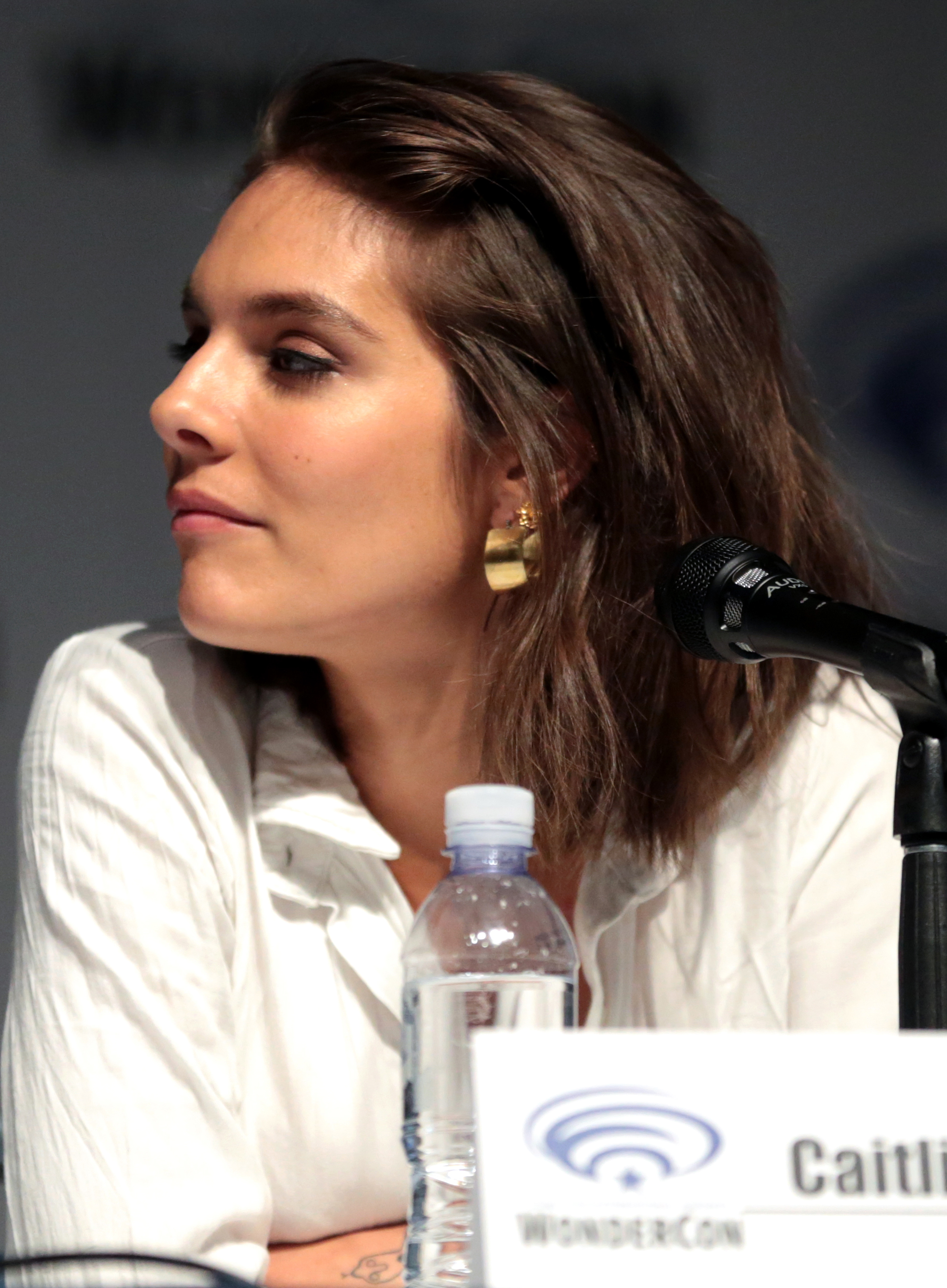
- Stasey in 2017
- Born: Caitlin Jean Stasey; 1 May 1990 (age 36); Melbourne, Victoria, Australia
- Education: Star of the Sea College
- Occupations: Actress; singer
- Years active: 2000–present
- Spouse: Lucas Neff (m. 2016; div. 2020)
- Partner: Erin Murphy-Muscatelli (2021–present)

Caitlin Jean Stasey (born 1 May 1990) is an Australian actress and singer. She is known for her role as Rachel Kinski in Neighbours. Previously she played Francesca Thomas in The Sleepover Club, although her breakthrough film role came in Tomorrow, When the War Began, a 2010 film adaptation of the teen novel of the same name in which she played lead protagonist Ellie Linton. She also played Lady Kenna in the CW series Reign from 2013 to 2015 and had a recurring role in the ABC2 series Please Like Me from 2013 to 2016. In 2017, Stasey starred as Ada on the Fox television drama APB, which was cancelled after one season in May 2017. In 2020, she starred in the short film Laura Hasn't Slept and had a brief role as the same character in the feature film version Smile (2022).

== Early life ==
Caitlin was born in Melbourne, Victoria, where she was raised with her younger sister Victoria. Her parents are David and Sally.

Stasey attended Star of the Sea College. In 2001, she travelled the world as a member of the Australian Girls Choir and took part in a re-recording of Peter Allen's "I Still Call Australia Home" for a Qantas commercial.

== Career ==
Stasey's career started in September 2003, when she was cast in the children's TV series The Sleepover Club, playing Francesca 'Frankie' Thomas, the self-appointed leader of the club. She made a brief return for the second series, appearing the first episode in 2006.

After a year studying and attending auditions, in April 2005 Neighbours casting director Jan Russ cast her as Rachel Kinski. Her first episode was aired on 18 August. Stasey left Star of the Sea College after landing the part of Rachel, but continued to study on a distance education programme. In September 2008, Stasey announced in an interview to the Herald Sun that she would be leaving Neighbours in the coming weeks, primarily to concentrate on her end of year VCE exams. The producers stated that her character would not be 'killed-off', allowing Stasey the chance to return. Stasey said "I want to know that when I finish my exams and get my score, it is representative of my abilities, my exams start in November and I want to be able to give them my full concentration."

In 2008, Stasey was chosen to star in the movie adaptation of the teen novel, Tomorrow, When the War Began as the lead character Ellie Linton, a teenage girl who documents her time with a group of friends fighting the invasion of Australia. During 2008, Stasey was linked to a potential live action film of the video game franchise Wonder Boy, before Sega cancelled the proposal. Robin Morningstar revived the project as a CGI movie, but Stasey withdrew to be in the film adaptation Tomorrow, When the War Began. Her CGI character, although with a new voice, retains her face. In December 2008, she appeared in the Christmas pantomime Snow White at Norwich Theatre Royal.

The same year, Stasey stated that she had turned down a recording contract offered to her by Tom Nichols, who had also offered one to former Neighbours star Stephanie McIntosh. About it she said "acting is my main passion and I wanted to concentrate my efforts on that, although most actors have that triple threat of being able to sing, dance and act."

However, she recorded two duets with fellow Neighbours cast member Dean Geyer; their cover of "I'm Yours", originally by Jason Mraz, was used for an episode of Neighbours, and their characters performed the song "Unforgettable" on the episode. On 19 May 2008, Stasey and Geyer performed "Unforgettable" at the Erinsborough High School Formal. The song was released to the Australian iTunes store, where it peaked at number 40 on the ARIA Digital Tracks chart.

From 2013 to 2015, Stasey appeared in the American television series Reign as Kenna, a lady-in-waiting to Mary, Queen of Scots. From 2013 to 2016, she had a recurring role in the ABC2 series Please Like Me.

In 2013, she starred in the independent comedy-horror film All Cheerleaders Die as Maddy. The following year, she appeared in the movie I, Frankenstein as Keziah from the gargoyle order.

In January 2015, Stasey launched her own feminist-themed website, herself.com dedicated to showing nude women of diverse characteristics.

On 22 February 2016, Stasey was cast in the Fox drama APB as Ada Hamilton, The pilot received a series order on 10 May. which premiered in February 2017. The show was cancelled after one season in May 2017.

Stasey played ATF Agent Anya Ooms in the 2018 legal drama series For the People.

In April 2023, Stasey was featured in the music video for "One That Got Away" by MUNA.

== Personal life ==
In 2016, she married American actor Lucas Neff, which whom she was in a "somewhat open relationship" with. In early 2021, Stasey revealed that she and Neff had divorced and that she had entered a relationship with Erin Murphy-Muscatelli. In the past, she has variously identified her sexuality as "mostly gay", bisexual and fluid.

As of 2023, Stasey lives in Los Angeles.

== Filmography ==
=== Film roles ===
Year	Title	Role	Notes
2009	Summer Camp	Christine	
2010	Tomorrow, When the War Began	Ellie Linton	
2013	Evidence	Rachel	
2013	All Cheerleaders Die	Maddy Killian	
2014	Lust for Love	Trinity / Divinity	
2014	Chu and Blossom	Cherry Swade	
2014	I, Frankenstein	Keziah	
2016	All I Need	Chloe	a.k.a. Wake in Fear
2016	Fear, Inc.	Lindsey Gains	
2018	Summer Days, Summer Nights	Suzy Denner	a.k.a. Summertime
2019	Kindred Spirits	Sadie	
2020	Laura Hasn't Slept	Laura Weaver	Short film
2022	Smile	Laura Weaver	
2026	Apex	Leah	

=== Television ===
Year	Title	Role	Notes
2003, 2006	The Sleepover Club	Francesca "Frankie" Thomas	Main cast (series 1); episode: "What Are Friends For" (series 2)
2005–09	Neighbours	Rachel Kinski	Soap opera, regular role
2013–15	Reign	Kenna	Main cast (seasons 1–2)
2013–16	Please Like Me	Claire	Main cast
2017	APB	Ada Hamilton	Main cast
2018	For the People	ATF Agent Anya Ooms	Episodes: "Everybody's A Super Hero", "Extraordinary Circumstances"
2018	The Girl in the Bathtub	Julia Law	TV movie
2021	Fantasy Island	Isabel Marshall	Episode: "The Romance & the Bromance"
2021–22	Bridge and Tunnel	Jill	Main cast
2023	Class of '07	Saskia	Main cast
2023	Mayans M.C.	Johnny	Main cast (season 5)
2025	Watson	Ginny Roberts	Episode: "Teeth Marks"
