= Bryce McGuire =

American screenwriter and producer

- Born: Bryce James McGuire; November 24, 1987 (age 38); Fort Lauderdale, Florida, U.S.
- Education: American Film Institute (MFA)
- Occupations: Screenwriter; film director; producer
- Years active: 2008–present
- Notable work: Night Swim

Bryce James McGuire (born November 24, 1987) is an American filmmaker. He is best known for writing and directing the horror film Night Swim (2024). He also co-wrote the horror film Baghead (2023).

== Early life and education ==
McGuire was born and raised in the Fort Lauderdale area of Florida. His mother was an English professor and his father a librarian, and he grew up surrounded by books and storytelling. He began writing short stories as a child and wrote a fantasy novel during his teenage years, which he would read to his cousins every summer. His first filmmaking experience came in high school at Keswick Christian School, where a teacher allowed him to create a short film instead of writing an essay; McGuire has described the positive reception from classmates as a formative moment that ignited his passion for the medium. His earliest effort as a child filmmaker was a horror movie in which his father gradually turned into a monstrous plant.

McGuire continued his film studies at Bryan College in Dayton, Tennessee, before being accepted into the screenwriting programme at the American Film Institute (AFI) in Los Angeles, where he earned a Master's degree. After graduating, he spent seven years in Los Angeles making short films and working odd jobs while developing his career as a professional screenwriter.

== Career ==
=== Early work and short films ===
McGuire began directing short films in 2008, starting with A Pistol in Hand Is Worth Two in the Glove Box. Over the next several years, he directed and wrote a series of shorts, including Jesus Fish (2013), The Whistler (2013), and Veladora (2013).

In 2014, McGuire wrote and co-directed the short film Night Swim with his frequent collaborator Rod Blackhurst. The four-minute film depicted a woman swimming alone in a pool at night, terrorised by an unseen presence. They self-funded the production and shot it in a single night in a Valley apartment pool. The short went viral online and attracted industry attention, though McGuire did not initially plan to expand it into a feature.

McGuire directed his first feature film, Unfollowed (2018), a screenlife supernatural horror film with social media themes, starring McKaley Miller and Brendan Meyer.

=== Professional screenwriting ===
Following Unfollowed, McGuire spent several years working as a professional screenwriter in Hollywood. He adapted material for Amblin Partners, wrote the screenplay for Baghead for StudioCanal, and did rewrite work for Blumhouse Productions, all before returning to the director's chair for the feature version of Night Swim.

Baghead, directed by Alberto Corredor and co-written by McGuire with Christina Pamies, was released in 2023. The folk horror film, starring Freya Allan and Peter Mullan, follows a young woman who inherits a dilapidated pub and discovers a shape-shifting creature in its basement.

=== Night Swim (2024) ===
For three years after making the 2014 short, McGuire resisted expanding it, concerned that the concept could not sustain a feature-length narrative without becoming repetitive. He ultimately found the story's emotional core after his friend and AFI classmate Dan Myers was diagnosed with multiple sclerosis, which inspired the central dramatic thread of the film: a family reckoning with a father's degenerative illness. McGuire developed a mythology for the pool drawing on folklore about water worship and wishing wells in Gaelic and Celtic traditions.

McGuire sent the short film to producer James Wan along with a 15-page prose treatment. Wan, who watched the short while swimming in his own pool at night, was reportedly frightened by it and agreed to produce the feature through his Atomic Monster banner. Blumhouse Productions and Universal Pictures subsequently came on board, making Night Swim the first theatrical release following the merger of Atomic Monster and Blumhouse.

The film starred Wyatt Russell and Kerry Condon, with Amélie Hoeferle and Gavin Warren as their children. McGuire cited Jaws (1975), Poltergeist (1982), The Abyss (1989), and Creature from the Black Lagoon (1954) as key influences, and has noted that the crew affectionately referred to the project as "Pooltergeist".

Night Swim was released in the United States on January 5, 2024. It opened to $12 million domestically, finishing second behind Wonka in its opening weekend, and earned a total of approximately $54.8 million worldwide against a production budget of $15 million. While the film was considered financially profitable due to its modest budget, it received largely negative reviews from critics, holding a 19% approval rating on Rotten Tomatoes, and earned a "C" grade from CinemaScore.

=== Subsequent projects ===
McGuire served as a producer on Dolly (2025), a slasher film directed by his longtime collaborator Rod Blackhurst. The film, shot on 16 mm film in the Chattanooga area, premiered at the Fantastic Fest in September 2025 and was acquired by Shudder and Independent Film Company for distribution.

McGuire and Blackhurst are co-founders of the Witchcraft Motion Picture Company, a production collective based in Chattanooga, which produced Dolly and other genre projects. McGuire has expressed interest in bringing more film production to Chattanooga and has been involved in efforts to build soundstages in the city and advocate for tax incentives to compete with nearby Atlanta.

His upcoming projects include Bad Bloom, a horror film that McGuire is set to write and direct and stars Vera Farmiga.

In 2026, it was announced that Jacob Chase is set to direct the horror film Sleepover, which he co-wrote with McGuire, and is based on an original short story by McGuire. Jason Blum serves as a producer for Blumhouse-Atomic Monster, while Chase, McGuire and Bea Sequeira will executive produce. It is scheduled to be released on October 8, 2027 by Universal Pictures.

== Personal life ==
McGuire and his wife have two sons. He is based in the Chattanooga area.

== Filmography ==
=== Feature film ===
Year	Title	Director	Writer	Producer	Notes
2018	Unfollowed	Yes	Yes	No	Directorial debut
2021	Rollers	No	No	Executive	
2023	Baghead	No	Yes	No	
2024	Night Swim	Yes	Yes	No	
2025	Dolly	No	No	Yes	

=== Short film ===
Year	Title	Director	Writer	Producer	Notes
2008	A Pistol in Hand Is Worth Two in the Glove Box	Yes	Yes	No	
2009	You Dropped Your Quarter	Yes	Yes	No	
2011	About Face	No	Yes	No	
2013	Jesus Fish	Yes	Yes	No	
2013	Veladora	No	Yes	No	
2013	The Whistler	Yes	Yes	No	
2014	Night Swim	Yes	Yes	No	Segment of Witchcraft Motion Picture Company Presents: Horror Anthology - Volume 1
2014	My Friend Jenkins	No	Yes	No	
2015	Surf Noir	No	Yes	No	
2016	Soon You Will Be Gone and Possibly Eaten	Yes	Yes	No	
2019	Pig	No	Yes	No	
2020	The Fortune Teller	No	No	Yes	
2023	Every House Is Haunted	Yes	Yes	No	

=== Television ===
Year	Title	Role	Notes
2016	Face Off	Himself	2 episodes

=== Additional literary material ===
- Imaginary (2024)
