= Parker Finn =

American filmmaker (born 1987)

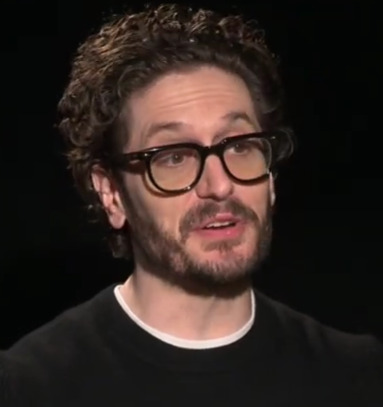
- Finn in 2024
- Born: March 18, 1987 (age 39); Bath, Ohio, U.S.
- Occupations: Film director; producer; screenwriter
- Years active: 2018–present
- Notable work: Smile; Smile 2

Parker J. Finn (born March 18, 1987) is an American filmmaker. He is best known for creating the Smile franchise. He wrote and directed the horror films Smile (2022) and its sequel Smile 2 (2024).

== Early life ==
Finn was born on March 18, 1987, in Bath, Ohio. He attended the University of Colorado Boulder, then attended Chapman University's Dodge College of Film and Media Arts, where he received a screenwriting MFA in 2011.

== Career ==
In 2018, Finn wrote and directed the horror short film The Hidebehind, which screened at Panic Fest and the Portland Horror Film Festival in 2019.

In 2020, Finn wrote and directed the horror short film Laura Hasn't Slept, which was filmed at Chapman University Dodge College of Film and Media Arts' Stage B. The short won the Special Jury Award at SXSW 2020.

In 2022, Finn made his feature film directorial debut with the horror film Smile, which was based on his short film Laura Hasn't Slept (2020). The film premiered at Fantastic Fest on September 22, 2022, and was released in the United States on September 30, 2022, by Paramount Pictures. It became 2022's top grossing original horror film and spawned a franchise.

In 2023, Finn entered a multi-year first-look deal with Paramount Pictures to write, produce, and direct additional feature films. That same year, he founded the production company Bad Feeling.

In 2024, it was announced that Finn would write and direct the horror film Possession, a remake of the 1981 film. It is scheduled to be released in the United States on June 11, 2027, by Paramount Pictures. Later that year, Finn wrote and directed Smile 2, which was released in the United States on October 18, 2024, by Paramount Pictures.

== Filmography ==
Short film

Year	Title	Director	Writer	Producer
2018	The Hidebehind	Yes	Yes	No
2020	Laura Hasn't Slept	Yes	Yes	Yes

Feature film

Key
†	Denotes productions that have not yet been released

Year	Title	Director	Writer	Producer	Notes
2022	Smile	Yes	Yes	No	Film directorial debut
2024	Smile 2	Yes	Yes	Yes	
2027	Possession †	Yes	Yes	Yes	Filming

Acting roles

Year	Title	Role	Notes
2024	Smile 2	Photographer	
2025	The Studio	Himself	Episode: "The War"
