= Nicholas Alexander Chavez =

American actor (born 1999)

- Born: September 6, 1999 (age 27); Houston, Texas, U.S.
- Education: Rutgers University
- Occupation: Actor
- Years active: 2021–present

Nicholas Alexander Chavez (born September 6, 1999) is an American actor. He played Spencer Cassadine on the ABC soap opera General Hospital from 2021 to 2024, for which he won the Daytime Emmy Award for Outstanding Younger Performer in a Drama Series. He portrayed Lyle Menendez in the crime drama series Monsters: The Lyle and Erik Menendez Story and priest Charlie Mayhew in the horror series Grotesquerie, both co-created by Ryan Murphy in 2024.

== Early life and education ==
Chavez was born in Houston, Texas. He has three younger half-siblings. He lived in Sugar Land, Texas, before his family relocated to Denver, Colorado. His parents had never married, but they split when he was five and they decided to split his time between his mother's home in Denver and his father's hometown of Arvada, Colorado. His mother is originally from Russia, and her original surname, Vansikleymova, was passed on to her son, who legally adopted him as Vansikleymov, officially changed to Ellis Island. Chávez comes from a large Russian family and grew up speaking Russian as his first language and learning English as a second. As a child, Chavez spent a lot of time outdoors, snowboarding, hiking and mountain biking. He described himself as a "precocious kid". At an early age, Chavez developed an interest in performing, including recreating the blessing of the Eucharist, which he saw at Sunday Mass. He was also a member of the Colorado Children's Chorale and performed at the Ellie Caulkins Opera House and the Denver Center for the Performing Arts. Chavez attended Camp Rising Sun in 2014. His maternal grandparents and his maternal family in general were Russian immigrants, while his grandmother was a Volga German born in Russia. His father is an American of Spanish, English, and Mexican descent, from a family originally from New Mexico; Nicholas's great-grandfather was Mexican.

Chavez attended East High School, where he played football and joined the speech and debate team headed by his mentor, Matt Murphy. When Murphy took over the drama department a year later, he recruited Chavez, then a junior, to play Atticus Finch in the school's production of To Kill a Mockingbird. Chavez quit football to focus on the play. As a senior, Chavez began studying at Visionbox Studio Theater under Jennifer McCray Rincón. While he couldn't afford to pay her, Chavez assisted around the theatre while Rincón helped him prepare for college auditions. Chavez applied to several top American drama programs, including Rutgers University, Carnegie Mellon University, New York University, and the Juilliard School. Except for Juilliard, Chavez was accepted to all of the schools. Chavez attended the Mason Gross School of the Arts at Rutgers. After two years, Chavez took a leave of absence from Rutgers and relocated to Los Angeles to pursue acting full time. However, he was forced to go back to Vero Beach, Florida, with his father when the COVID-19 pandemic struck in 2020. Chavez worked a few "odd" jobs, including at a car dealership, while he submitted self-taped auditions.

== Career ==
On July 1, 2021, Chavez made his television debut as Spencer Cassadine on General Hospital. Chavez signed a three-year deal. Only a few months into his General Hospital tenure, he mourned the loss of his longtime manager, Jenevieve Brewer. He exited the role in January 2024. In 2022, Chavez starred as Jason in the Tubi original film Crushed.

In 2023, Chavez was cast in the second season of Ryan Murphy's Netflix anthology series Monsters: The Lyle and Erik Menendez Story (2024). He portrayed Lyle Menendez.

In August 2024, it was reported Chavez had also been cast in Murphy's Grotesquerie, a dramatic horror series for FX. In the midst of the premieres ten days apart, Chavez signed with Creative Artists Agency for representation. In November 2024, he was cast in the fourth installment of the I Know What You Did Last Summer franchise. However, his scene was cut from the film.

In March 2025, it was announced that he had been cast in psychological thriller The Technique alongside Ben Platt, Emma Roberts, Laura Harrier, Kelsey Asbille, and Noomi Rapace.

In April 2025, he was cast to play Kilroy in the summer 2025 Williamstown Theatre Festival revival of the Tennessee Williams play Camino Real.

== Acting credits ==
=== Film ===
Year	Title	Role	Notes	Ref.
2022	Crushed	Jason Curtis	Tubi original film	
2025	I Know What You Did Last Summer	Billy	Deleted scene	
2027	Possession †	TBA	Filming	
TBA	The Technique †	TBA	Post-production	
TBA	Supermax †	TBA	Filming	

=== Television ===
Year	Title	Role	Notes	Ref.
2021–2024	General Hospital	Spencer Cassadine	Main role	
2024	Monsters: The Lyle and Erik Menendez Story	Lyle Menendez	Main role	
2024	Grotesquerie	Dr. Charlie Mayhew	Main role	

=== Theater ===
Year	Title	Role	Notes	Ref.
2025	Camino Real	Kilroy	Williamstown Theatre Festival	

== Awards and nominations ==
List of acting awards and nomination
Year	Award	Category	Title	Result	Ref.
2021	Soap Hub Awards	Favorite Newcomer	General Hospital	Won	
2022	Daytime Emmy Award	Outstanding Younger Performer in a Drama Series	General Hospital	Won	
2023	Daytime Emmy Award	Outstanding Supporting Actor in a Drama Series	General Hospital	Nominated	
