= Lord of War =

2005 American crime drama film

- Theatrical release poster
- Directed by: Andrew Niccol
- Written by: Andrew Niccol
- Produced by: Andreas Grosch; Norm Golightly; Andrew Niccol; Chris Roberts; Christopher Eberts; Nicolas Cage; Philippe Rousselet
- Starring: Nicolas Cage; Jared Leto; Bridget Moynahan; Ian Holm; Ethan Hawke
- Cinematography: Amir Mokri
- Edited by: Zach Staenberg
- Music by: Antonio Pinto
- Production companies: Entertainment Manufacturing Company; Saturn Films; Ascendant Pictures; VIP 3 Medienfonds
- Distributed by: Lions Gate Films (United States); Metro-Goldwyn-Mayer (Germany; through 20th Century Fox)
- Release date: September 16, 2005 (United States)
- Running time: 122 minutes
- Countries: United States; Germany
- Language: English
- Budget: $42–60 million
- Box office: $72.6 million

Lord of War is a 2005 crime drama film written, produced and directed by Andrew Niccol. It stars Nicolas Cage, Jared Leto, Bridget Moynahan, Ethan Hawke, and Eamonn Walker in primary roles. The plot follows an unscrupulous Ukrainian-American man named Yuri Orlov (portrayed by Cage) as he participates in the global arms trafficking industry in the years preceding and succeeding the dissolution of the Soviet Union.

The film was released in the United States by Lions Gate Films on September 16, 2005, and received mixed reviews, with many praising the opening sequence's messaging and Cage's performance as Yuri, but garnered criticism for its lack of focus and handling of Yuri's character. It grossed US$72.6 million at the box office, making it a box office disappointment, but the film enjoyed robust DVD sales. A sequel, Lords of War is set to be released in 2027.

== Plot ==
In the early 1980s, Ukrainian-American restaurant employee Yuri Orlov (Nicolas Cage), whose family assumed Jewish identities to emigrate from the Soviet Union, witnesses a gunfight amongst the Russian mafia in his neighborhood of Brighton Beach. The incident inspires him to begin trafficking arms for personal profit, with Yuri comparing the ever-present human need for armaments to the necessity of the restaurant industry. Through a contact at his father's synagogue, Yuri acquires an Uzi submachine gun and makes his first sale, eventually convincing his reluctant younger brother Vitaly (Jared Leto) to become his partner in crime.

The two brothers get their big break with the Lebanese Civil War following the 1983 Beirut barracks bombings. As he prospers financially, Yuri increasingly witnesses his activities directly enabling atrocities and war crimes, and is relentlessly pursued by Jack Valentine (Ethan Hawke) of Interpol; Valentine represents a unique and persistent threat to Yuri's business because he has a particularly strong moral compass and cannot be bribed or coerced into backing down from his pursuit. Meanwhile, an arms deal with a Colombian drug lord ends with the brothers being forcefully paid off with a large shipment of cocaine, to which Vitaly quickly develops a severe addiction. Yuri checks him into a rehabilitation center and continues building his empire alone. He uses his profits to seduce and marry supermodel Ava Fontaine (Bridget Moynahan), who he's idolized since adolescence. She later gives birth to their son Nikolai.

Upon the dissolution of the Soviet Union in 1991, Yuri flies to Ukraine and meets his uncle Dmitri (Eugene Lazarev), a Soviet general who is overseeing the distribution of the assets of the Soviet Armed Forces. As he illegally supplies Yuri and rebuffs his competition, Dmitri is killed in a car bombing orchestrated by rival arms dealer Simeon Weisz (Ian Holm). Yuri then expands his empire to Africa and starts doing business with Liberian dictator André Baptiste. As a "gift" to honor their alliance, Baptiste captures Weisz and offers Yuri a chance to execute him; Yuri refuses, but Baptiste puts the gun into his hand and pulls the trigger. Yuri is disturbed by Baptiste's appetite for bloodshed, including his use of child soldiers, but remains undeterred from selling weapons and ammunition to him.

Valentine eventually discovers Orlov's family and trophy wife, confiding in Ava that her husband is an arms trafficker, prompting her to confront Yuri. In response, Yuri starts trading timber and oil, but quickly becomes frustrated with the lower profits of legitimate work. In 2000, he returns to crime after Baptiste visits him while in New York to discuss peace terms at the headquarters of the United Nations, and offers him the largest payday of his career: a stash of blood diamonds. Suspicious of his behavior, Ava tails Yuri, unaware that Interpol is tracking her, and discovers the shipping container that holds his arms-dealing office and contraband.

Yuri convinces Vitaly to accompany him to Africa to help him during a deal with a Sierra Leonean militia, which is allied with Baptiste and is preparing to massacre a camp of refugees. Vitaly watches as a woman and a child are hacked to death by Baptiste's allied soldiers, and subsequently pleads with Yuri to cancel the sale. Yuri refuses, stating that the sale's impact on the refugees is not their concern and that Baptiste's men would kill them if they called off the deal. Unable to quell his distress, Vitaly steals a pair of grenades and destroys a truck full of weapons, also killing Baptiste's son, before he is gunned down by the Sierra Leonean militants. Yuri is spared and receives half of the diamonds in exchange for the remaining truckload. He then bribes a Liberian doctor to remove the bullets from Vitaly's body and forge a death certificate, but the doctor misses a bullet. This round is then found by U.S. customs officials, who promptly arrest Yuri as Ava leaves with Nikolai and his family disowns him.

Valentine detains Yuri in anticipation of his trial and life-long conviction, but Yuri, while dejected, is unfazed. He tells Valentine that a high-ranking military officer will soon knock on the door and insist on his release. He explains that while he is an international criminal, he sometimes serves the interests of the U.S. government by covertly arming the enemies of its enemies. Valentine hears a knock at the door, looks at Yuri for a moment, and rebukes him.

Yuri is released and returns to arms trafficking because it's what he does best.

== Cast ==
- Nicolas Cage as Yuri Orlov, a Ukrainian-American international arms trafficker who sells to anyone who can pay.
- Jared Leto as Vitaly Orlov, Yuri's younger brother and business partner.
- Ethan Hawke as Jack Valentine, an incorruptible Interpol agent and the primary threat to Yuri's livelihood.
- Bridget Moynahan as Ava Fontaine, a world-renowned American supermodel and Yuri's wife.
- Ian Holm as Simeon Weisz, a European international arms trafficker who rivals Yuri and sells to only those who align with his political views or serve his political interests.
- Eamonn Walker as André Baptiste Sr., a hawkish Liberian dictator and one of Yuri's top clients (based on Liberia's former president and convicted war criminal Charles Taylor).
- Sammi Rotibi as André Baptiste Jr., the violent and self-indulgent son of Baptiste Sr, based on Charles McArther Emmanuel.
- Eugene Lazarev as Dmitri Orlov, a corrupt Soviet military officer and Yuri's uncle
- Jean-Pierre Nshanian as Anatoly Orlov, the Catholic-turned-Jewish father of Yuri and Vitaly.
- Shake Toukhmanian as Irina Orlov, the Catholic mother of Yuri and Vitaly.
- Tanit Phoenix as Candy, Vitaly's girlfriend

== Production ==
=== Pre-production ===
Lord of War originated a couple of years before 2004 when Andrew Niccol, a New Zealand screenwriter, wrote the original script. An agent of the Creative Artists Agency eventually gave Philippe Rousselet, a French film producer, the script in 2004, summarizing it as a "Goodfellas in the world of arms dealing". Rousselet was impressed by the script but could not find an American studio that would take it on, as it was pitched to studios right before the beginning of the Iraq War. As commented by Entertainment Weekly, studios were not eager to finance a film that drew "troubling conclusions" about the role of the American military providing weapons to dictators.

An additional complication was that scenes in the script were written to occur in up to 13 countries, requiring filming in varying locations. The film planned to make use of the United Kingdom tax fund Movision, but the expenses cap in Section 48 of the Finance Act of 2004 disqualified the film. South Africa provided financial incentives for filming, such as paying back 15% of all expenditures incurred within its borders.

Rousselet reported to Variety that the financing necessary for the film was a mixture of debt taken on with Citibank West, the VIP3 German tax fund, and foreign sales. The remainder was paid by Rousselet.

=== Production ===
Shooting began on July 19, 2004. Production was primarily based in South Africa, the Czech Republic and New York City. Scenes in Ukraine were filmed in the Czech Republic, and scenes in Africa, the Caribbean, and Beirut were all filmed in South Africa. Effort was taken to have extras that looked appropriate for every country depicted, both in attire and ethnicity. Due to the film's low budget, many scenes were constructed with only basic elements. One scene consisted entirely of 10,000 clay bricks and an extra in North African garb.

While filming in the Czech Republic, Niccol discovered it was cheaper to purchase real firearms rather than props, and so he purchased 3,000 Kalashnikovs. Most were sold back at a loss, though some were sawn in half to remove them from circulation. Niccol commented that he found it disturbing how easy it was to purchase them. Niccol met a variety of arms dealers during the production process, whom he came to like. He attributed their likeability despite their profession to the fact that they were very good salesmen. A particular scene in the film featured a line of 50 T-72 tanks. These were provided by a source in the same country, and they told Niccol that he could use them until December, as they were needed back by then to sell to Libya. NATO had to be told about the tanks, as satellite imagery suggested a weapons build up in the country. Another sequence of scenes showed Yuri co-piloting an Antonov An-12 transport plane. The plane was provided by an arms dealer, and it was actively being used for transporting firearms during the time of production.

== Release ==
=== Box office ===
Lord of War released theatrically on September 16, 2005. Lions Gate Films provided distribution in the United States while Arclight Films distributed in other territories. It grossed a total of $24.1 million in the United States and Canada, and $48.5 million in other territories, for a worldwide total of $72.6 million.

The film grossed $9.4 million in the United States and Canada, $105 thousand in Latin America, $4.1 million in Europe, and $1.1 million in the Asian Pacific on their respective opening weekends. The film ranked number three in the opening weekend box office category behind Just Like Heaven and The Exorcism of Emily Rose in the United States and Canada.

=== Critical reception ===
On the review aggregator website Rotten Tomatoes, 62% of 148 critics' reviews are positive, with an average rating of 6.30/10. The website's consensus reads: "While Lord of War is an intelligent examination of the gun trade, it is too scattershot in its plotting to connect." Metacritic, which uses a weighted average, assigned the film a score of 62 out of 100, based on 31 critics, indicating "generally favorable" reviews. Audiences surveyed by CinemaScore gave the film an average grade of "B−" on an A+ to F scale.

The opening scene of the film, showcasing the point of view of a bullet being made and eventually fired out of a rifle, was praised by critics. David Denby of The New Yorker characterized the sequence as "malicious wit" from Niccol, commenting that by forcing the audience to watch it, Niccol suggested that they were complicit in the sale of firearms. In a review by Harry Haun, writing for the Film Journal Institute, he wrote that he wished the film was as direct and "head on" as the opening sequence was. Rahul Hamid of Cinéaste stated that the "sensational opening effectively makes the same point that the film will explore ... that violence around the world begins and ends directly at our doorstep."

Praise was also given to Cage's performance as Yuri Orlov. Ann Hornaday of The Washington Post stated that Cage was cast well for Yuri, writing that "he has the right scale and size to portray a man who isn't meant to resemble anyone real". Stephen McIntire, writing for Business Record [Des Moines], wrote that Cage's screen persona was a good balance of one-liners and witty dialogue. Geoffry Macnab of Sight & Sound stated that Cage's interpretation of Yuri was someone audiences would root for due to his sleek charisma.

Some publications criticized the focus of the film, questioning if the narrative and messaging were well balanced. In a review by the New York Amsterdam News, written by Natasha Grant, she characterized the narration by Cage as preachy without the audience being given a clear reason as to why they should care, stating the film may have been better as a documentary. McIntire was critical of the film for "[playing] fast and loose with both external and internal facts." He goes on to state that the primary focus of the film is on the illegal sale of firearms, but the film concludes criticizing the sale of firearms by governments, which McIntire called a "blatant bait-and-switch". Owen Gleiberman of Entertainment Weekly commented that Lord of War was a trailer, acting as a lecture, and bearing the length of a feature film. Mick LaSalle, writing for the San Francisco Chronicle, criticized the film for failing to answer questions regarding the logistics of gun-running that it introduces, such as how buyers are found or where merchandise is stored.

Critics also took issue with the handling of Yuri's character. LaSalle wrote that Yuri is a shell of a character designed to be a perfect gundealer and that, despite the character having turning points, the character hits metaphorical rock bottom twice, with LaSalle writing that the second did not have much meaning. Haun referred to the character of Yuri as a "soft-focused ... central character", and that due to the fact he was inspired by five different real-world individuals, the film had too little humanity that could make Yuri understandable to the audience. Macnab stated that it was ironic that Yuri, despite being charismatic, never changed throughout the film. He writes that in one particular scene, it appears Yuri is full of such intense self-loathing that he goes on a "booze and drug-fueled binge", but it does not have any narrative effect because he "always recaptures his composure". Macnab compared the writing of Yuri's conscience to Yuri's drug habit, being something that he is always able to get over, resulting in the critical nature of the arms trade coming across as ambivalent.

Two years after the film's release Amnesty International, a non-governmental organization focusing on human rights, released a statement of support for the film due to it "[illustrating] the deadly impact of the uncontrolled global arms trade."

=== Accolades ===
The film received a special mention for excellence in filmmaking from the National Board of Review.

== Historical accuracy ==
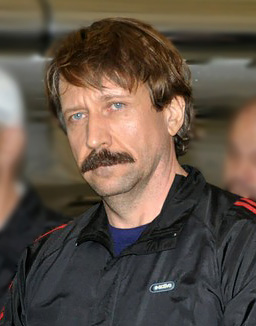
Viktor Bout in 2010. Publications claim that Yuri Orlov was inspired by five different gun runners, with some naming Bout in particular.

Publications report that Yuri is based on five criminal arms dealers. Forbes, The Independent, and The New York Times name Viktor Bout, a Russian arms dealer, as a specific source of inspiration. Yuri shares characteristics with Bout, and several events in Lord of War mirror actions attributed to him. For example, both men held the nickname "Merchant of Death", sold weapons to both sides of the same conflict, and traveled with multiple passports, among other similarities.

In 2015, the National Security Archive reported that Sarkis Soghanalian, an Armenian-Lebanese arms dealer, was an inspiration for Yuri's character.

== Sequel ==
A sequel to Lord of War, titled Lords of War, was scheduled to begin filming in the fall of 2023. Cage is reportedly returning as Yuri Orlov, as well as producer alongside Rousselet, with Bill Skarsgård reportedly executive producing and playing the character's son. CAA Media Finance is handling the United States and Canada rights while FilmNation Entertainment is representing the film's sales in all other territories. In November 2025, Sylvia Hoeks and Greg Tarzan Davis joined the cast, with filming set to begin later on in Belgium and Morocco.

== See also ==
- While There's War There's Hope (1974 film), Italian film directed and starring Alberto Sordi; a film with similar subject and topic coverage
- War Dogs (2016 film), biopic about international arms dealers
- Trigger (2025 series), an action-thriller series depicting the societal impact of a sudden, large-scale influx of illegal firearms
