= Omar Sharif (disambiguation) =

Omar Sharif (1932–2015) was an Egyptian actor

Omar Sharif may also refer to:

- Omar Sharif Jr. (born 1983), Egyptian model and actor; grandson of Omar Sharif
- Omar Sharif, fictional character in the film War, Inc.
- Omar Khan Sharif, one of the perpetrators of the Mike's Place suicide bombing in 2003

== See also ==
- Umer Shareef (1960–2021), Pakistani actor
