= Jonesville, Texas =

Unincorporated community in Texas, US

Coordinates: 32°29′53″N 94°06′40″W

Jonesville is a rural unincorporated community in eastern Harrison County, Texas, United States.. The community is located just west of Waskom, or approximately 20 miles east of the county seat, Marshall

== Notable people ==
- J. Waskom Pickett, Methodist bishop
- T. Wayland Vaughan, geologist
