= J. Waskom Pickett =

American minister and missionary

- Born: Jarrell Waskom Pickett; February 21, 1890; Jonesville, Texas, U.S.
- Died: August 17, 1981 (age 91)
- Education: Asbury College
- Occupations: Minister; missionary
- Spouse: Ruth Pickett (m. 1916)
- Relatives: Laura Harrier (great-granddaughter)

Jarrell Waskom Pickett (February 21, 1890 – August 17, 1981) was an American Methodist minister and missionary to India.

== Early life ==
Pickett was born in Jonesville, Texas, February 21, 1890, to Leander Lycurgus Pickett and Ludie Carrington Day. Leander, a Methodist minister and intenerant evangelist, was born in Burnsville, Mississippi, on February 27, 1859. He pastored churches and conducted revival meetings throughout the South and Southwest. On one such occasion he spoke at Mansfield Female College, an all-women's school in DeSoto Parish, Louisiana. There he met Ludie Carington Day, a professor at the school. The two began seeing each other socially and were married on December 5, 1888. Leander was 30 years old. Ludie was 21. The couple had seven children.

In 1890, the Picketts lived in Wilmore, Kentucky, where his father, Leander, became involved in the founding of Asbury College. Soon after they arrived in Wilmore, Pickett was enrolled at Asbury College and graduated in 1907 at the age of seventeen.

== Career ==
In 1910, E. Stanley Jones asked Pickett to assume leadership of an English-speaking Methodist congregation Jones had founded in India. Pickett accepted that invitation and was appointed to serve in Lucknow, India, by the Methodist Board of Foreign Mission. On October 1, 1910, he boarded the steamship Baltic in New York City and set sail for India. Three months later, at a meeting of the North India Conference of the Methodist Church held from January 4–10, 1911, in Lucknow, Pickett was ordained into the ministry as an elder in the Methodist Church.

When Pickett returned to India he assumed leadership of a boys school in Arrah, India.

In 1933, Pickett published "Christian Mass Movements in India" which chronicled and examined the growth of the church in India. Principles described by Pickett in that work became the basis for the Church Growth Movement. Donald McGavran, one of the earliest proponents of that movement, often said, "I lit my fire at Pickett's candle."

In 1935, Pickett was consecrated a Methodist bishop by the Central Conference of Southern Asia. Pickett provided leadership for the Methodist Church's work in India until he retired from the missionary field in 1956. Following retirement, he returned to the United States and accepted a teaching position at Boston University's School of Theology.

== Personal life ==
While working in India, Pickett met Ruth Robinson, the daughter of John Wesley Robinson, a Methodist bishop for Southern Asia. Ruth had been born in Lucknow on March 9, 1895. The two were attracted to each other, but Ruth insisted on obtaining a college degree and returned to the United States where she attended Northwestern University in Chicago, Illinois, graduating in 1916. Later that summer, Pickett joined Ruth in Chicago where, on July 27, 1916, they were married.

The Picketts had four children: Elizabeth, Miriam, Margaret, and Douglas, all born in India. His daughter Margaret Pickett Sagan was the grandmother of American actress Laura Harrier, making him Harrier's great-grandfather.

== Death ==
He died in Columbus, Ohio, on August 17, 1981, at the age of 91. His cause of death is unknown.

== Writings ==
- Christian Mass Movements in India, a study with recommendations (1933 Abingdon Press)
- Christ's Way to India's Heart (1937, C.O. Forsgren)

== Biographies ==
McPhee, Arthur G. The Road to Delhi: J. Waskom Pickett and Missions in the Twilight of the Raj and Dawn of Nationhood (Emeth Press, 2012).
