= The Realest Real =

- Directed by: Carrie Brownstein
- Story by: Carrie Brownstein
- Starring: Laura Harrier; Natasha Lyonne; Kim Gordon; Rowan Blanchard; Mahershala Ali
- Release date: September 12, 2016
- Running time: 6:41
- Country: United States
- Language: English

The Realest Real is a 2016 American "absurdist" social media satire short film written and directed by Carrie Brownstein, for KENZO PARIS. It is Brownstein's directorial debut.

== Cast ==
- Laura Harrier
- Natasha Lyonne
- Kim Gordon
- Rowan Blanchard
- Mahershala Ali

== Plot ==
"Writer and director Carrie Brownstein takes online comments literally in this absurdist short for Kenzo."

"The story centers on a young girl (Harrier) who calls Lyonne "Mom" on Instagram and is transformed into her real-life daughter, with strange consequences."

== Development ==
Brownstein collaborated with Carol Lim and Humberto Leon of Kenzo.

"I visited Carol and Humberto in Paris at the end of 2015, and they showed me the inspiration behind the line, and we talked a lot about fandom and about the way that we idealize people. I think fans have always inserted themselves into the narrative and into the story of the lives of their idols, and now we have more tools for that with technology, with social media, with memes. - Carrie Brownstein"

== Production ==
The film was shot at the Los Angeles Times Building.

== Release ==
The film was released on September 12, 2016.

== Reception ==
"The Realest Real" was nominated for the Tribeca X Award, awarded to the best advertising/entertainment mashup of 2016.
