= Grotesquerie (TV series) =

2024 American horror drama television series

- Genre: Crime thriller; Drama; Horror; Murder mystery
- Created by: Ryan Murphy; Jon Robin Baitz; Joe Baken
- Starring: Niecy Nash; Courtney B. Vance; Nicholas Alexander Chavez; Micaela Diamond; Raven Goodwin; Lesley Manville
- Composer: Morgan Kibby
- Country of origin: United States
- Original language: English
- No. of episodes: 10

Production
- Executive producers: Ryan Murphy; Alexis Martin Woodall; Max Winkler; Jon Robin Baitz; Joe Baken; Eric Kovtun; Scott Robertson; Nissa Diederich; Niecy Nash-Betts; Courtney B. Vance; Peter Liguori
- Producers: Kip Davis Myers; Daniel Portnoy; Adam Penn
- Running time: 30–58 minutes
- Production companies: Ryan Murphy Television; Scratchpad; 20th Television

Original release
- Network: FX
- Release: September 25 – October 30, 2024

Grotesquerie is an American horror drama television series created by Ryan Murphy, Jon Robin Baitz, and Joe Baken for FX. Niecy Nash stars as Detective Lois Tryon, alongside Courtney B. Vance, Nicholas Alexander Chavez, Micaela Diamond, Raven Goodwin, and Lesley Manville.

The series premiered on September 25, 2024. On November 11, 2026, the series was officially cancelled.

== Premise ==
Detective Lois Tryon must work with Sister Megan, a local nun, to figure out the source of a series of heinous crimes that is affecting both their community and their personal lives.

== Cast and characters ==
=== Main ===
- Niecy Nash as Det. Lois Tryon
- Courtney B. Vance as Marshall Tryon
- Nicholas Alexander Chavez as Father Charlie / Dr. Charles Mayhew (Note: He was known as a priest named "Father Charlie" in Lois' coma dreams during the first 7 episodes of the season. Then it was revealed he was actually Dr. Charlie Mayhew.)
- Micaela Diamond as Sister Megan / Chief of Police Megan Duval (Note: She was known as a nun named "Sister Megan" in Lois' coma dreams during the first 7 episodes of the season. Then it was revealed she was actually Chief of Police Megan Duval.)
- Raven Goodwin as Merritt Tryon
- Lesley Manville as Nurse Redd / Cherry Redd (Note: She was known as a nurse named "Nurse Redd" in Lois' coma dreams during the first 7 episodes of the season. Then it was revealed she was not a nurse and her full name was Cherry Redd.)

=== Recurring ===
- Brooke Smith as Chief of Detectives Gale Hanover
- Joshua Bitton as Sergeant Jack Cranburn
- Tessa Ferrer as Grace Finn
- Travis M. Kelce as Ed Laclan

=== Guest ===
- Victoria Abbott as Andrea Salana
- Kathryn Hunter as Maisie Montgomery
- Lillias White as Glorious McKall
- John Billingsley as Dr. Lehman
- Santino Fontana as Dr. Witticomb
- Spenser Granese as Justin Blake

== Episodes ==
| No. | Title | Directed by | Written by | Original release date | U.S. viewers (millions) |
|---|---|---|---|---|---|
| 1 | "Pilot" | Max Winkler | Ryan Murphy & Jon Robin Baitz & Joe Baken | September 25, 2024 | 0.343 |
| 2 | "True Crime Catholics" | Max Winkler | Ryan Murphy & Jon Robin Baitz & Joe Baken | September 25, 2024 | N/A |
| 3 | "The Bender" | Ryan Murphy | Ryan Murphy & Jon Robin Baitz & Joe Baken | October 2, 2024 | 0.203 |
| 4 | "Coordinates" | Alexis Martin Woodall | Ryan Murphy & Jon Robin Baitz & Joe Baken | October 2, 2024 | 0.144 |
| 5 | "Red Haze" | Max Winkler | Ryan Murphy & Jon Robin Baitz & Joe Baken | October 9, 2024 | 0.224 |
| 6 | "Good Caesarean Work" | Max Winkler | Ryan Murphy & Jon Robin Baitz & Joe Baken | October 9, 2024 | 0.171 |
| 7 | "Unplugged" | Max Winkler | Ryan Murphy & Jon Robin Baitz & Joe Baken | October 16, 2024 | 0.200 |
| 8 | "In Dreams" | Elegance Bratton | Ryan Murphy & Jon Robin Baitz & Joe Baken | October 23, 2024 | 0.173 |
| 9 | "The Stinging Aroma of Sulfur" | Alexis Martin Woodall | Ryan Murphy & Jon Robin Baitz & Joe Baken | October 23, 2024 | 0.108 |
| 10 | "I Think I'm Dead" | Alexis Martin Woodall | Ryan Murphy & Jon Robin Baitz & Joe Baken | October 30, 2024 | 0.196 |

== Production ==
The series was announced in February 2024, when creator Ryan Murphy released a teaser on Instagram. Niecy Nash, Courtney B. Vance and Lesley Manville were set to star.

== Release ==
=== Broadcast ===
The trailer for Grotesquerie was released in August 2024. The first two episodes of Grotesquerie premiered on FX on Wednesday, September 25, 2024. The subsequent eight episodes aired weekly on Wednesdays in pairs until October 23, 2024. In Canada, Grotesquerie premiered on FX on Wednesday, September 25, with the first of two weekly episodes airing at 10 p.m. ET/PT.

=== Streaming ===
Episodes of Grotesquerie were made available for streaming on Hulu the day after their FX broadcast. Internationally, the series was made available to stream on Disney+.

The series debuted at No. 1 on Hulu's "Top 15 Today"—a daily updated list of the platform's most-watched titles—on its first full day of release and remained on the list for five consecutive days as of October 1, 2024, alongside other Ryan Murphy-produced series like American Sports Story and Doctor Odyssey. The streaming aggregator Reelgood, which tracks 20 million monthly viewing decisions across all streaming platforms in the U.S., reported that Grotesquerie was the eighth most-streamed television series in the U.S. for the week of September 26 to October 2. Analytics company Samba TV, which gathers viewership data from certain smart TVs and content providers, calculated that it was the ninth most-watched program during the week of September 30 to October 6. By the week ending October 9, Reelgood announced that Grotesquerie was the ninth most-streamed series in the U.S.

== Reception ==
=== Critical response ===
On the review aggregator website Rotten Tomatoes, 75% of 16 critics' reviews are positive. The critics' consensus reads, "Equal parts campy and terrifying, Grotesquerie is a stomach-churning feast for viewers seeking a thrill." Metacritic, which uses a weighted average, assigned the series a score of 51 out of 100, based on 7 critics, indicating "mixed or average" reviews.

Nakeisha Campbell of PureWow remarked that while the graphic imagery in Grotesquerie can be unsettling—almost prompting her to stop watching the series—she stated that Niecy Nash-Betts's strong performance kept her engaged. She praised the exploration of Detective Lois Tryon's personal struggles and highlighted the partnership between Tryon and Sister Megan, describing their dynamic as a refreshing addition to the narrative. Campbell also acknowledged the suspenseful tone and expressed curiosity about the series' direction, recognizing its appeal to fans of intense horror. Matthew Creith of TheWrap praised Nash-Betts for her performance, portraying a flawed character who battles alcoholism and personal struggles while investigating a series of grotesque murder cases. He appreciated the eccentricity of the supporting characters, particularly Sister Megan and Nurse Redd, saying they add layers of strangeness to the narrative. Creith complimented the show for its dark and macabre tone, noting its evolution from a typical police drama into a deeper exploration of paranoia and sociopathy, while also acknowledging the intriguing dynamics and theological themes presented throughout the series.

Daniel Kurland of Bloody Disgusting noted that Grotesquerie feels akin to a season of American Horror Story while being more focused and grounded. He found the atmosphere to evoke a heavy sense of dread, drawing parallels to Seven and Hannibal, and said that the contrast between horror and domestic life enhances the impact of the murders. Kurland praised Nash-Betts for her performance and highlighted Micaela Diamond's Sister Megan Duval as the standout character, suggesting that their dynamic explores themes of faith amid violence. Kurland recognized that while Murphy's shows often start strong but may falter, Grotesquerie establishes a solid foundation, concluding with cautious optimism regarding the series' potential within the horror genre. Daniel Fienberg of The Hollywood Reporter noted that Grotesquerie feels familiar within Murphy's universe, with a setup reminiscent of American Horror Story and Seven, incorporating themes of religious symbolism and societal decay. He praised Nash-Betts' portrayal as a detective, complimenting her fresh take on the archetype and strong chemistry with supporting actors Raven Goodwin and Courtney B. Vance. Fienberg also highlighted Diamond's breakout role as Sister Megan but found the series somewhat predictable in its early episodes, hoping for more innovation in future installments.

Petrana Radulovic of Polygon described Grotesquerie as intriguing but flawed, highlighting the engaging mystery and over-the-top, religiously symbolic murders. She praised the performances, particularly those of Nash-Betts as Detective Lois Tryon and Diamond as Sister Megan. Radulovic also complimented the show's setup and its disturbing crime scenes reminiscent of Seven, but expressed doubt about Murphy's ability to deliver a satisfying conclusion, based on his previous projects. Rebecca Nicholson of The Guardian gave Grotesquerie a score of three out of five stars and called the show more downbeat compared to Murphy's typical work, focusing on a grander narrative amid its gothic horrors. She found the show visually striking but criticized its reliance on clumsy exposition, which undermines its eerie atmosphere. Nicholson praised Nash-Betts' performance as a hard-drinking detective, noting her poise despite the clichéd nature of the role, and complimented Lesley Manville's skilled delivery of absurd lines. While acknowledging its slow pace, she found the series intriguing with its themes of societal collapse, faith, and fear, suggesting it is worth continuing despite some flaws.

=== Ratings ===
The premiere episode on September 25, 2024, had 343,000 viewers (P2+) with a 0.11% rating and 276,500 household viewers with a 0.22% rating. Subsequent episodes recorded fluctuating viewership, with the October 30, 2024 episode drawing 196,000 viewers (0.06% rating), a 2% decrease from the October 16 episode, which had 200,000 viewers (0.06% rating). Household viewership ranged between 138,500 and 163,500 from October 2 to October 30, with ratings between 0.11% and 0.13%. The adult 18–49 demographic ranged from 40,500 to 67,000 viewers during this period.

=== Accolades ===
Grotesquerie was one of 200 television series that received the ReFrame Stamp for the years 2024 to 2025. The stamp is awarded by the gender equity coalition ReFrame and industry database IMDbPro for film and television projects that are proven to have gender-balanced hiring, with stamps being awarded to projects that hire female-identifying people, especially women of color, in four out of eight key roles for their production.

| Year | Award | Category | Nominee(s) | Result | Ref. |
|---|---|---|---|---|---|
| 2025 | Black Reel Awards for Television | Outstanding Editing | Shannon Baker Davis | Nominated | |
| 2025 | Creative Arts Emmy Awards | Primetime Emmy Award for Outstanding Makeup (Non-Prosthetic) | Kate Biscoe; Tierra Richards; Naima Jamal; Victor Del Castillo | Nominated | |
| 2025 | Critics' Choice Super Awards | Best Actress in a Horror Series, Limited Series or Made-for-TV Movie | Niecy Nash | Nominated | |
| 2025 | Make-Up Artists & Hair Stylists Guild Awards | Best Contemporary Makeup - Television Series, Limited Series or Miniseries, or Movie for Television | Kate Biscoe; Tierra Richards; Naima Jamal; Victor Del Castillo | Nominated | |
| 2025 | Make-Up Artists & Hair Stylists Guild Awards | Best Contemporary Hair Styling - Television Series, Limited Series or Miniseries, or Movie for Television | Valerie Jackson; Lauren Poole; Sharif Poston; Jason Green | Nominated | |
| 2025 | NAACP Image Awards | Outstanding Stunt Ensemble (Television or Film) | Grotesquerie | Nominated | |
| 2025 | Queerty Awards | TV Performance | Niecy Nash | Nominated | |
| 2025 | Saturn Awards | Best Horror Television Series | Grotesquerie | Nominated | |
