= Marissa Bode =

American actress (born 2000)

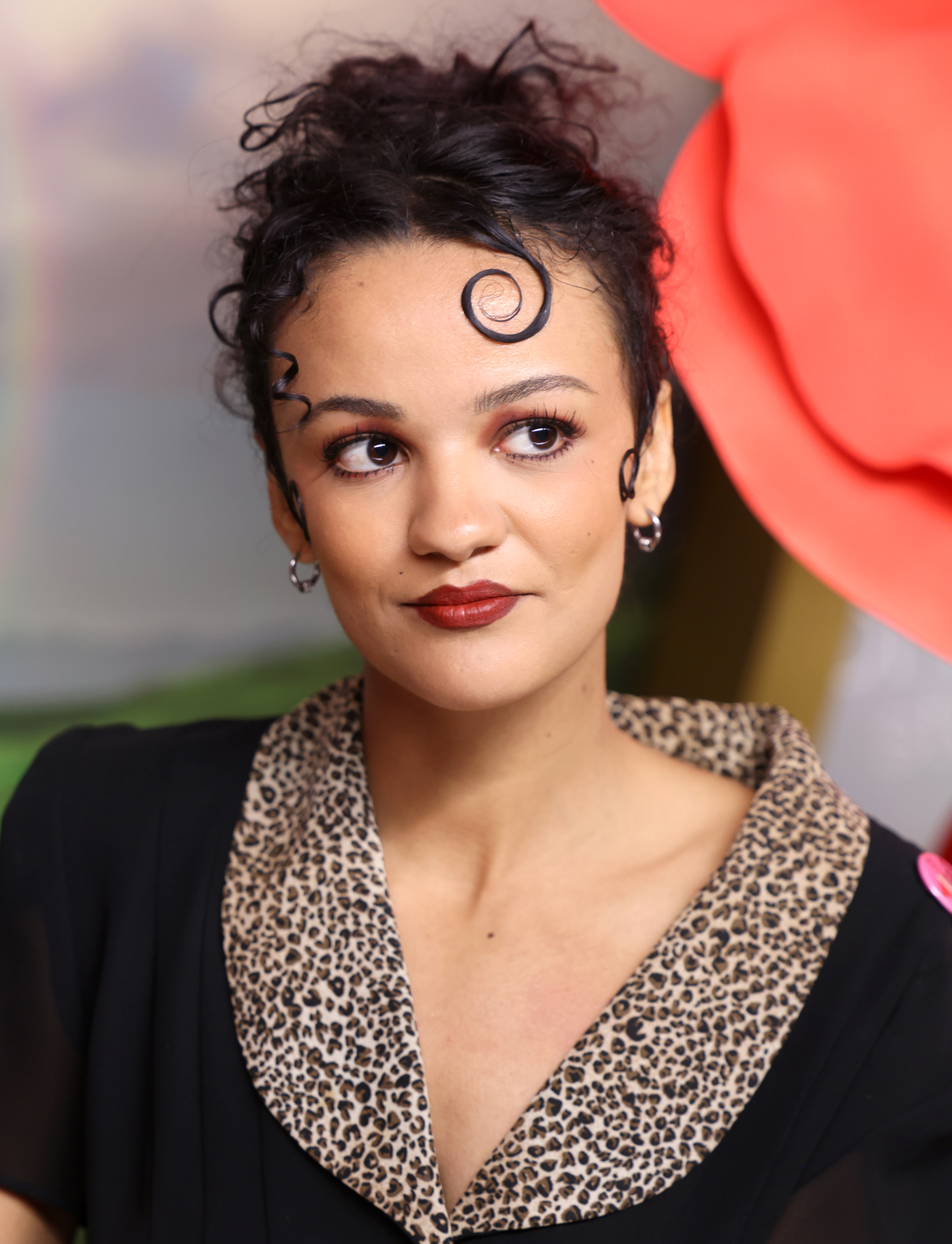
- Bode in 2025
- Born: August 28, 2000 (age 26); Mazomanie, Wisconsin, U.S.
- Education: American Musical and Dramatic Academy
- Occupation: Actress
- Years active: 2013–present
- Partner: Lauren Brooks (2023–2026)

Marissa Bode (/ˈboʊdi/ BOH-dee; born August 28, 2000) is an American actress. After graduating from the American Musical and Dramatic Academy, she gained recognition for her portrayal of Nessarose Thropp in the musical films Wicked (2024) and Wicked: For Good (2025).

== Early life and education ==
Bode was born in Mazomanie, Wisconsin, to a Black mother and a White father. At the age of 11, on the way to practice for a theater production, she became paralyzed following a car crash, and has since relied on a wheelchair for mobility. She started acting at school and starred in local productions, with her first role being that of an orphan in The Prince and the Pauper. She graduated from the American Musical and Dramatic Academy and currently lives in Los Angeles.

== Career ==
=== Theater ===
Bode has performed onstage since the age of eight in local productions such as Little Shop of Horrors, Peter Pan, and Mary Poppins.

=== Film and television ===
Bode wrote, directed, and produced her first short film in 2021, called You're Adorable.

In 2022, it was announced she would play Nessarose, Elphaba's sister and the Wicked Witch of the East, in the Wicked film adaptations, making her feature film debut. She made history by being the first wheelchair user to play the character, who also uses a wheelchair. Bode shared her excitement for the role and for being able to represent disabled women of color in the film: "To be that representation for not only disabled people but disabled people of color is so exciting and so surreal". She also praised the accessibility of the Wicked set, finding it to have been designed with a wheelchair user in mind. The set had a disability coordinator, Chantelle Nassari, who is also a wheelchair user, who would visit sets before Bode to anticipate any issues Bode might have around the set so they could be fixed beforehand. Director Jon M. Chu stated that making the set accessible was "one of the most enlightening and beautiful processes I've ever gone through. You need accessibility, not just when we're on set behind the scenes, but you need to present accessibility in Oz itself." Her casting in the role marked the first time a disabled actress portrayed the character. For her performance, Bode received several nominations as part of the film's ensemble cast—which includes Cynthia Erivo, Ariana Grande, Michelle Yeoh and Jeff Goldblum—and with her inclusion in the film's Outstanding Cast in a Motion Picture nomination at the 31st Screen Actors Guild Awards, she became the first ever wheelchair user to garner a nomination in any category at the SAG Awards.

As part of the marketing campaign for the film, Mattel, one of the collaborating brands, released seven dolls of the main characters including Elphaba, Glinda and Nessarose with removable outfits and accessories and built in the likenesses of the actors.

== Personal life ==
Bode identifies as queer. Her Instagram account’s biography has the bisexual flag colours (pink, purple, and blue hearts), implying that she is bisexual. She was in a relationship with fellow wheelchair user Lauren Brooks from September 2023 until June 2026, when Bode announced their separation in a video posted to TikTok.

== Filmography ==
=== Film ===
Year	Title	Role	Notes	Ref.
2013	Carsleepers	Cassie Hairston	Short	
2019	No Roles Written	Kalliope	Short	
2021	You're Adorable	—N/a	Short; writer, director, and producer	
2024	Wicked	Nessarose Thropp	Feature film debut; also contributed to Wicked: The Soundtrack	
2025	Wicked: For Good	Nessarose Thropp	Also contributed to Wicked: For Good – The Soundtrack	
TBA	Snare	Greta Mills	Filming	

== Discography ==
Year	Title	Other Artist(s)	Albums
2024	"Dancing Through Life"	Jonathan Bailey, Ariana Grande, Ethan Slater and Cynthia Erivo	Wicked: The Soundtrack
2025	"The Wicked Witch of the East"	Ethan Slater and Cynthia Erivo	Wicked: For Good – The Soundtrack

== Awards and nominations ==
Year	Award	Category	Nominated work	Result	Ref.
2024	Astra Film Awards	Best Cast Ensemble	Wicked	Nominated	
2024	Washington D.C. Area Film Critics Association	Best Acting Ensemble	Wicked	Nominated	
2024	Michigan Movie Critics Guild	Best Ensemble	Wicked	Nominated	
2024	North Texas Film Critics Association	Best Newcomer	Wicked	Nominated	
2024	North Texas Film Critics Association	Best Ensemble	Wicked	Nominated	
2024	San Diego Film Critics Society	Best Ensemble	Wicked	Nominated	
2024	Las Vegas Film Critics Society	Best Ensemble	Wicked	Nominated	
2024	St. Louis Film Critics Association	Best Ensemble	Wicked	Nominated	
2024	New York Film Critics Online	Best Ensemble	Wicked	Nominated	
2024	Alliance of Women Film Journalists	Best Ensemble Cast	Wicked	Nominated	
2025	Screen Actors Guild Awards	Outstanding Performance by a Cast in a Motion Picture	Wicked	Nominated	
2025	NAACP Image Awards	Outstanding Ensemble Cast in a Motion Picture	Wicked	Nominated	
2026	Astra Film Awards	Best Cast Ensemble	Wicked: For Good	Nominated	
2026	Astra Film Awards	Best Young Performer	Wicked: For Good	Nominated	
