= The Technique (film) =

- Directed by: Brian McGreevy
- Written by: Brian McGreevy
- Produced by: Chris K. Daniels; Jordan Drake; David Duque-Estrada; Chadd Harbold; Russ Posternak
- Starring: Emma Roberts; Noomi Rapace; Kelsey Asbille; Ben Platt; Laura Harrier; Nicholas Alexander Chavez
- Cinematography: Ludovica Isidori
- Edited by: Sophie Corra
- Production companies: The Launch Company; Raised By Wolves
- Country: United States
- Language: English

The Technique is an upcoming American psychological thriller film written and director by Brian McGreevy. The film is about five actors who take a part of mysterious week-long intensive led by famous but secretive instructor. It stars Emma Roberts, Noomi Rapace, Kelsey Asbille, Ben Platt, Laura Harrier and Nicholas Alexander Chavez.

== Cast ==
- Emma Roberts
- Noomi Rapace
- Kelsey Asbille
- Ben Platt
- Laura Harrier
- Nicholas Alexander Chavez

== Production ==
In March 2025, it was announced that Brian McGreevy would direct and write the script to psychological thriller called The Technique. In the same month, it was reported that Emma Roberts, Noomi Rapace, Kelsey Asbille, Ben Platt, Laura Harrier and Nicholas Alexander Chavez joined the cast. Principal photography began in New York City in March 2025. Filming wrapped in February 2026. The film was produced by Chris K. Daniels of The Launch Company, with Launch serving as the production company delivering the film as well. Other producers include Jordan Claire Robbins, Jordan Drake, Brian McGreevy and David Duque-Estrada.
