= Lords of War =

Upcoming American crime drama film

- Directed by: Andrew Niccol
- Written by: Andrew Niccol
- Produced by: Nicolas Cage; Philippe Rousselet; Fabrice Gianfermi
- Starring: Nicolas Cage; Bill Skarsgård; Laura Harrier; Sylvia Hoeks; Greg Tarzan Davis
- Cinematography: Amir Mokri
- Edited by: Álex Rodríguez
- Production companies: Saturn Films; Vendôme Pictures
- Distributed by: Vertical (United States)
- Release date: January 22, 2027
- Countries: United States; France
- Language: English

Lords of War is an upcoming crime drama film. Serving as a sequel to Lord of War (2005), the film was written and directed by Andrew Niccol, and stars co-producer Nicolas Cage, who reprises his role, along with Bill Skarsgård, Laura Harrier, Sylvia Hoeks, and Greg Tarzan Davis.

== Premise ==
Yuri Orlov discovers he has a son, Anton, who is trying to top his father's wrongs rather than stop them as he launches a mercenary army to fight America's Middle East conflicts.

== Cast ==
- Nicolas Cage as Yuri Orlov (largely based on the exploits of international arms dealer Viktor Bout)
- Bill Skarsgård as Anton Orlov
- Laura Harrier
- Sylvia Hoeks
- Greg Tarzan Davis

== Production ==
=== Development ===
In May 2023, it was announced at the 2023 Cannes Film Festival, that a sequel to Lord of War was in active development, written and directed by Andrew Niccol, and Nicolas Cage reprising his role as Yuri Orlov, with Bill Skarsgård joining the cast as his son Anton Orlov. In February 2024, Laura Harrier joined the cast in an undisclosed role. In November 2025, Sylvia Hoeks and Greg Tarzan Davis joined the cast.

=== Filming ===
Principal photography began in November 2025 in Belgium. Filming continued in December 2025 in Morocco at various Casablanca and Marrakesh locations, as well as in Budapest. Amir Mokri served as the cinematographer.

=== Post-production ===
French-born Mexican Álex Rodríguez edited the film.

== Release ==
In March 2026, Vertical acquired U.S. distribution rights to the film, planning to theatrically release the film sometime in 2027. The film is scheduled to be released in the United States on January 22, 2027.
