= Mid-Century =

- Official release poster
- Directed by: Sonja O'Hara
- Written by: Mike Stern
- Produced by: Mike Stern
- Starring: Stephen Lang; Shane West; Bruce Dern
- Music by: Vivek Maddala
- Production companies: Future Proof Films; Astral Plane; Moo Studios
- Distributed by: Blue Fox Entertainment; Lionsgate
- Release date: June 17, 2022
- Running time: 105 minutes
- Country: United States
- Language: English

Mid-Century is a 2022 American horror thriller film directed by Sonja O'Hara and written and produced by Mike Stern. The film stars Bruce Dern, Stephen Lang and Shane West, with the latter two also serving as executive producers.

== Plot ==
In 1963, Joanne and Anthony Waxen live in a home built by Frederick Banner, with whom the two have had concerning interactions. Joanne, a stay-at-home housewife is given underwear as a gift by her husband. After Joanne leaves to change, Frederick enters the house. Joanne finds Frederick peeking on her while Anthony has been hanged from the ceiling with a belt.

In 2022, Alice is a doctor who is harassed by her superior and is traumatized from her time working during the COVID-19 pandemic. She and her architect husband Tom go on a weekend getaway to San Diego and rent a mid-century modern home, the same that was built by Frederick, from a mysterious man named Eldridge. While there, strange events occur including a bird crashing into the window, doors opening by themselves, and a shadowy figure watching the couple while they have sex. As night falls, a delivery driver tells Tom about Eldridge, stating he freaks him out. After driving away, his tire pops and a man stabs him in the chest. Following dinner, Alice goes to interview at a hospital for a new job. The delivery driver is sent to Alice's hospital but she is unable to save him. After finding the receipt for the order in his pocket, officer Raquel and her partner interrogate her, inquiring if Tom had anything to do with the murder.

Meanwhile, Tom investigates the house and Frederick Banner. Tom searches Frederick on Wikipedia but finds a lot missing, so he calls his co-worker Hannah who he is sleeping with to find a book on him in their office. The book reveals that Frederick lost his first wife Alice and later remarried Joanne Waxen, and that he was also interested in polygamy and the occult with a painter named Emil Larson. Hannah hangs up but is soon-after strangled by a security guard. At the house, Tom is haunted by a woman who, after nearly drowning Tom in the pool, leads him to a book of the occult and later to a grave in the backyard with the bones of Graham Verdin. When Tom touches the bones he sees visions which reveal that the woman is Marie Verdin and the wife of Graham, a woman who Frederick was manipulating at the same time as Joanne whom he later kills and takes her son as his own, now named Eldridge Banner. She reveals to Tom that Frederick killed the husbands of the couples who moved into his neighborhood and that he still haunted the house where he died. Eldridge returns to the home and Tom calls 911 before falling into a ditch outside. The two officers arrive at the house and question Eldridge, but do not go further as he is a top fundraiser for the police. Tom is then possessed by Marie and talks to her son through him before he drowns Tom and buries him in the yard. Tom however still exists as a ghost and spends time with Marie. The two discover a recording of Frederick and Emil discussing a prophesied blood "wolf" moon in which a woman can be impregnated with a spirit.

The police discover the delivery driver was killed by an architect's compass, narrowing the suspect down to Eldridge or Tom. Alice returns to the house after work and finds Tom missing. Eldridge confronts Alice and sedates her, preparing for the ritual. Tom then possesses Eldridge and digs up his own body before officer Raquel arrives and arrests him. Tom, speaking through Eldridge, admits to everything and asks to be arrested. The chief of police arrives and kills Raquel, revealing he is one of Eldridge's brother possessed by Frederick. The ritual begins with sons of Frederick surrounding Alice. Marie and Tom possessing Alice, kill the sons together and say their goodbyes. After Alice is transported to the hospital, Tom sees every house in the neighborhood has ghosts of Frederick's victims inside.

== Cast ==
- Stephen Lang as Frederick Banner
- Shane West as Tom Levin
- Bruce Dern as Emil Larson
- Chelsea Gilligan as Alice Dodgeson M.D.
- Vanessa Estelle Williams Beverly Gordon
- Sarah Hay as Marie Verdin
- Annapurna Sriram as Officer Raquel Dorado
- Emmy Perry as Hannah
- Sonja O'Hara as Dr. Kerri Brenan
- Bill Chott Dr. Volker
- Sebastian Quinn as Graham Verdin
- Ellen Toland as Joanne Waxtan
- Jon Park as Sgt Choe
- Mike Stern as Eldridge Banner
- Daniel V. Graulau as Delivery Guy
- James Gaudioso as Anthony Waxtan
- Jay Scully as Dr. Hal Brenan

== Production ==
Filming wrapped in October 2021.

== Release ==
In February 2022, it was announced that Blue Fox Entertainment acquired international rights to the film.

The film was released in theaters and on demand and digital platforms on June 17, 2022.

== Reception ==
On the review aggregator website Rotten Tomatoes, 36% of 11 critics' reviews are positive, with an average rating of 4.9/10.

In a mixed review, Robert Kojder for Flickering Myth highlighted the film's supernatural elements present in the third act, but says it "drop[s] the ball on various themes of sexism and gender." Conversely, Jeffrey Anderson of Common Sense Media stated the commentary on misogyny present in the characters' careers and home life was a highlight, but that the film's second half felt "lifted from some other film." Anderson was also disappointed that despite Bruce Dern's top billing, he appeared only briefly in a flashback.

In a more positive review, Richard Whittaker of The Austin Chronicle praised the film's commentary on architecture and its unique design that set it apart from similar films like 13 Ghosts and The Night House.
