= The Secret Scripture (film) =

- Theatrical release poster
- Directed by: Jim Sheridan
- Written by: Jim Sheridan; Johnny Ferguson
- Produced by: Noel Pearson
- Starring: Rooney Mara; Vanessa Redgrave; Jack Reynor; Theo James; Eric Bana
- Cinematography: Mikhail Krichman
- Edited by: Dermot Diskin
- Music by: Brian Byrne
- Production companies: Ingenious Senior Film Fund; Voltage Pictures; Ferndale Films
- Distributed by: Vertigo Releasing
- Release dates: 10 September 2016 (TIFF); 19 May 2017 (Ireland)
- Running time: 108 minutes
- Country: Ireland
- Language: English
- Box office: $694,981

The Secret Scripture is a 2016 Irish film, directed by Jim Sheridan from a screenplay by Sheridan and Johnny Ferguson, which is based on the 2008 novel of the same name by Sebastian Barry. The film stars Vanessa Redgrave, Rooney Mara, Eric Bana, Theo James, Aidan Turner, and Jack Reynor.

The film had its world premiere at the 2016 Toronto International Film Festival. It was released in the Republic of Ireland and the UK by Vertigo Releasing on 19 May 2017.

== Plot ==
The film alternates between the early years of World War II and the end of the 20th century.

Rose McNulty (Vanessa Redgrave) has been a patient in the Sligo Regional Mental Hospital for 50 years since being accused of murdering her baby in 1942. The facility is scheduled for demolition. Dr. Stephen Grene (Eric Bana) is a psychiatrist who, at the request of the local Catholic Church, is evaluating whether Rose should be transferred or released. He grew up in the area and has returned to sell his parents' home. Rose is adamant that she did not kill her baby and tells her story to Stephen using the pages of a Bible on which she has written and drawn an account of her life before her incarceration.

Around 1940, Rose (Rooney Mara), an orphaned young woman, evacuates from Northern Ireland to live with her aunt in the Irish Free State, now known as the Republic of Ireland. There, without any intent, she attracts the interest of many of the local men. She has a brief flirtation with Michael McNulty (Jack Reynor), a Protestant who sympathises with the British war effort and soon leaves to join the RAF. She tries to avoid the inappropriate attention of the local Catholic priest, Father Gaunt (Theo James). She dances with Jack Conroy (Aidan Turner), one of a group of anti-British Catholics. Seeking to avoid trouble after a fight between Father Gaunt and Jack, her aunt sends Rose to live in a deserted farmhouse outside the village.

One day a plane crashes nearby and Rose discovers the pilot hanging from a tree, trapped in his parachute. She cuts him down, discovers it is Michael and shelters him while he recovers, hiding him from the anti-British locals. They grow close and just as he is about to leave they confess their love, have sex, and are quickly married by the local Protestant minister. Before Michael can leave, the anti-British locals seize him from Rose's cottage and later kill him.

Father Gaunt, knowing that Rose had slept with Michael, writes a damning report of Rose's mental health, stating she suffers from "nymphomania". With the permission of her aunt, her only living relative, she is incarcerated in a local mental hospital and there subjected to both insulin shock therapy (insulin coma therapy) and later, electric shock therapy (ECT or electroconvulsive therapy). She discovers that she is pregnant and learns that babies born to single women are given up for adoption or spend their entire lives within the institution. She escapes to the beach. Pursued by Father Gaunt, she swims to a cove where she gives birth. The officer from the Garda Síochána in pursuit in a boat with Gaunt can see Rose striking the ground with a rock and believes that she is killing her newborn son. She was actually severing the umbilical cord with the rock, but Father Gaunt lets the authorities think she is a murderess and takes the baby.

In the present Stephen reveals to Rose's nurse (Susan Lynch) that his own father tried to tell him something about his parentage on his deathbed. He reads a passage from Rose's writing that suggests the baby was born in spring and an official document states 1 May 1942, the same day he was born. Searching his parents' papers, he finds a letter to him from his father revealing that he was indeed adopted and enclosed is a cross from his real father. He then figures out who his real parents are. Stephen returns to the mental asylum and shows Rose the letter. Stephen takes Rose to his family home.

== Cast ==
- Vanessa Redgrave as Old Roseanne McNulty
  - Rooney Mara as Young Roseanne McNulty
- Eric Bana as Dr. Stephen Grene
- Theo James as Father Gaunt
- Aidan Turner as Jack Conroy
- Jack Reynor as Michael McNulty
- Susan Lynch as Nurse Caitlin
- Adrian Dunbar as Dr. Hart
- Tom Vaughan-Lawlor as McCabe
- Aisling O'Sullivan as Aunt Eleanor
- Pauline McLynn as Anne McCartney
- Danika McGuigan as Chrissie
- John Connors as Joe Brady
- Omar Sharif Jr. as Daniel O'Brien
- Enda Oates as Driver

== Production ==
In January 2014, it was revealed that Jessica Chastain and Vanessa Redgrave had been cast in the film, with Noel Pearson producing the film, and Thaddeus O'Sullivan directing the film from a screenplay by Johnny Ferguson. In March 2014, Jonathan Rhys Meyers, and Jeremy Irons, were cast in the film. In July 2014, it was revealed that Rooney Mara had been cast in the film, replacing Chastain with Jim Sheridan replacing O'Sullivan as director. In August 2014, it was revealed that Theo James, Eric Bana, Jack Reynor were in talks to co-star in the film. In August 2015, it was revealed that Brian Byrne had composed the score for the film.

=== Filming ===
Filming was originally slated to begin in May and September 2014. Principal photography (including at Inistioge, County Kilkenny) began on 13 January 2015 and concluded on 6 March. During production of the film, Rooney Mara, Theo James, Eric Bana, Susan Lynch, Antony Acheampong and Vanessa Redgrave, were spotted filming.

== Release ==
In February 2014, Voltage Pictures began selling distribution rights to the film at the Berlin Film Festival. In November 2014, Relativity Media acquired U.S distribution rights to the film. In January 2016, the first image of Rooney Mara and Jack Reynor was released. In May 2016, Sheridan announced the film had been removed from Relativity Media, and it would be sold to a different distributor. The film had its world premiere at the 2016 Toronto International Film Festival.

The film was scheduled to be released in the United Kingdom on 24 March 2017. It was later pushed back to 19 May 2017. It was released in the United States on 13 October 2017, in a limited release and through video on demand by Vertical Entertainment.

== Response ==
Reviews of the film have generally been mixed to negative. On review aggregator website Rotten Tomatoes, the film has an approval rating of 35%, based on 40 reviews, with an average rating of 4.4/10. The website's critical consensus reads, "The Secret Scripture has acclaimed source material and a well-chosen cast in its corner, but despite its stars' valiant efforts, this adaptation was better left on the page." On Metacritic, the film has a score of 37 out of 100, based on 10 critics, indicating "generally unfavorable reviews".
