= Sonja O'Hara =

Canadian writer, director and actress

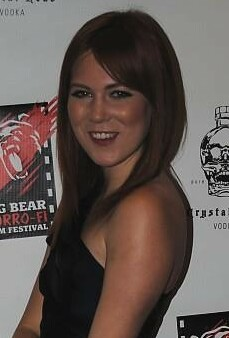
O'Hara in 2012

Sonja O'Hara (born Sonja Kristiansen) is an Emmy-nominated Canadian writer, director and actress who is represented by Verve and Anonymous Content. She is originally from Halifax, Nova Scotia, Canada, and resides in Los Angeles, California. She was born in 1995.

Her digital series Doomsday (which she created, directed and stars in) was nominated for the 2021 Daytime Emmy Awards under Outstanding Daytime Fiction Program.

She was selected as one of the “10 Filmmakers to Watch” by Independent Magazine, chosen by a jury from MovieMaker Magazine, the Sundance Institute and Austin Film Festival. Past recipients include Barry Jenkins, the Oscar-winning director of Moonlight. O'Hara created the critically acclaimed Amazon series Doomsday, which won Best Series at HBO's ITVFest. A Streamy Nominee (for “Best Indie Series”), O'Hara was presented the “Best Director” award out of 4,000 submissions at The New York Television Festival. She was a guest speaker at SXSW Film Festival on the episodic TV panel. Her upcoming series Astral was greenlit by Adaptive Studios, and she will write and direct all six episodes.

As an actress, she is best known for playing the role of Calpurnia Dylan in the 2015 American film Ovum. In 2007, O'Hara appeared on the New York stage in a production of Pulitzer Prize-winning author Norman Mailer's play The Deer Park as a character based on Marilyn Monroe.

In 2019, O'Hara made her feature film directorial debut helming the live-action adaptation of the popular Japanese video game Root Letter.

== Early life ==
O'Hara began acting at age ten, appearing in school plays, including a local production of The Nutcracker in which she played Clara. She is the youngest of two siblings. At 17, O'Hara moved to New York City to attend The New York Conservatory For Dramatic Arts. In 2006, she was cast as a lead in the New York debut of the recently discovered Tennessee Williams play Pieces of Paradise, directed by Stephan Morrow.

== Filmography ==
=== Film ===
Year	Title	Role	Notes
2010	Da Heist	Rachel White	
2010	In the Hands of God	Eve	
2010	#1 Cheerleader Camp	Betty	
2011	Shark Bite	Joanie	
2011	The Victorville Massacre	Stephanie Storms	
2011	For the Children	Anabelle	
2012	Bananazzz	Andenisse Brown	
2013	Town Red	Lily	
2013	Rambler	Alice	
2014	Ovum	Calpurnia Dylan	
2020	Root Letter		Director
2022	Mid-Century	Dr. Kerri Brenan	Actor and Director
TBA	Snare	Rowena Sullust	Actor and Director

== Sources ==
- "Mailer, Monologues, Mind Games Part of March Makor Line-Up". Raleigh.broadwayworld.com. 2013-03-04.
- Noetzel, Emilie (2011-10-11). "Victorville Massacre, The (2011) Review". Dread Central.
- Zinoman, Jason. "Three Dollar Bill", The New York Times, Theater Review, December 8, 2005.
- "American Massacre". Tomcat Films LLC. 2013-10-28.
- The DVD Blu-ray Release Report (2013)
