= Snare (film) =

- Directed by: Sonja O'Hara; Adam Hoelzel
- Written by: Sonja O'Hara; Adam Hoelzel
- Produced by: Sonja O'Hara; Adam Hoelzel; Margarita Zhitnikova
- Starring: Sonja O'Hara; Greg Tarzan Davis; Marissa Bode; Omar Sharif Jr.
- Cinematography: Antonio Cisneros
- Production companies: A Group of Ferrets; Besties Make Movies; Bohème Films
- Country: United States
- Language: English

Snare is an upcoming American body horror psychological thriller film written, produced, and directed by Sonja O'Hara and Adam Hoelzel. It stars O'Hara, Greg Tarzan Davis, Marissa Bode, and Omar Sharif Jr..

== Cast ==
- Sonja O'Hara
- Greg Tarzan Davis
- Marissa Bode
- Omar Sharif Jr.
- Sebiye Behtiyar
- Mark St. Cyr
- Robert Longstreet
- Mars

== Production ==
In October 2025, it was reported that Sonja O'Hara and Adam Hoelzel would be directing, writing, and producing a body horror psychological thriller film, with O'Hara in the lead role. Principal photography began on January 13, 2026, in Los Angeles, with Greg Tarzan Davis, Marissa Bode, Omar Sharif Jr., Sebiye Behtiyar, Mark St. Cyr, Robert Longstreet, and Margarita Zhitnikova joining the cast.
