= Laura Harrier =

American actress and model (born 1990)

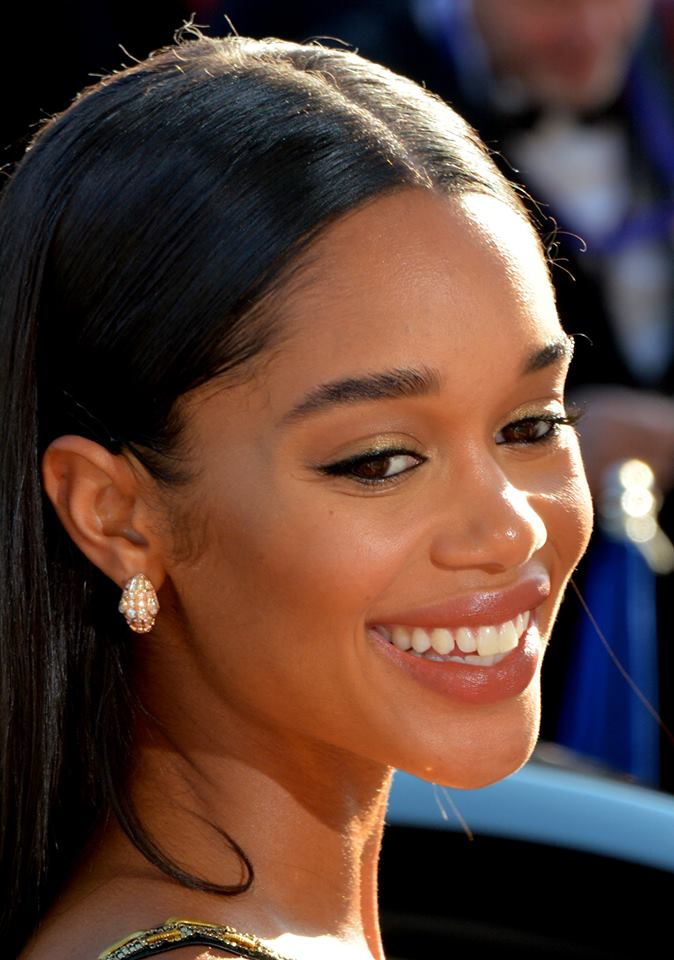
- Harrier in 2018
- Born: Laura Ruth Harrier; March 28, 1990 (age 36); Chicago, Illinois, U.S.
- Education: William Esper Studio
- Occupations: Actress; model
- Years active: 2007–present
- Partner(s): Klay Thompson (2018–2020); Sam Jarou (2021–2025)
- Relatives: J. Waskom Pickett (great-grandfather)

Laura Ruth Harrier (born March 28, 1990) is an American actress and model. She began modeling at the age of 17 after she was discovered by a location scout. She moved to New York City in 2007 where she continued modeling and was represented by agencies such as IMG Models and Wilhelmina Models. She modeled for various mainstream magazines, appeared in campaigns for Urban Outfitters, Macy's and Steve Madden, and was the face of Garnier. After appearing in several commercials and student films, Harrier decided to pursue acting and studied at the William Esper Studio. She was first recognized for her role as Destiny Evans in the 2013 one-season revival of the American soap opera One Life to Live.

Harrier's role as Peter Parker's love interest Liz Allan in Spider-Man: Homecoming brought her international attention in 2017. She gained further recognition for portraying civil rights activist Patrice Dumas in BlacKkKlansman (2018), receiving a Black Reel Award nomination. She starred as an art student in the independent drama film Balance, Not Symmetry in 2019. In 2020, she received further attention for starring as Camille Washington in the Netflix miniseries Hollywood.

Harrier is an ambassador for Louis Vuitton, and has modeled for other luxury brands like Bulgari, Calvin Klein, and Boss. She is outspoken about issues relating to civil rights and equality, frequently using her social media to raise awareness.

== Early life and education ==
Laura Ruth Harrier was born on March 28, 1990, in Chicago, Illinois, and was raised in the suburb of Evanston. Her father, Temujin Harrier, is African American and her mother, Linda (née Sagan), is of Polish and English descent. Her father works in insurance and her mother is a speech pathologist. She has one younger brother, William. Her great-grandfather, through her maternal grandmother, Margaret Pickett Sagan, was J. Waskom Pickett, a notable minister, missionary, and philanthropist. As a child, she had a speech impediment until three years old, which her mother cured. Harrier was shy, so her mother put her in acting classes to gain more confidence. She attended Evanston Township High School, where she took some drama classes and played sports. While in high school, she became particularly interested in fashion and was voted best dressed. She began modeling at the age of 17 after being discovered by her mother's friend, a location scout.

After graduating high school in 2008, Harrier moved to New York City to study art history at the New York University Gallatin School of Individualized Study. Upon arrival, Harrier chose to defer enrollment to continue a career in modeling. Throughout her modeling career she was represented by several prestigious agencies including IMG Models, Wilhelmina Models, and Elite Model Management. Harrier modeled for magazines such as Vogue, Cosmopolitan, Elle, and Glamour. Additionally, she modeled for campaigns with companies such as Urban Outfitters, Macy's, American Eagle, Target, ALDO, Steve Madden, and L'Oréal. She was the face for Garnier for a time and appeared in one of their national commercials. She eventually found modeling to be unfulfilling and pursued acting after appearing in commercials and student films. Harrier studied acting in the two-year program the William Esper Studio, graduating in 2015. After graduating, she thought she would be doing "weird, Off Broadway theater".

== Career ==
=== 2013–2017: Acting debut and breakthrough ===
While studying at the William Esper Studio, her first acting job was the main role of Destiny Evans in the only season of the web series revival of the American soap opera One Life to Live (2013). The role was originated by actress Shenell Edmonds, who was offered the opportunity to reprise it in the reboot but declined; Harrier took over the role after auditioning. Errol Lewis from the Soap Opera Network wrote that Harrier "[has] nicely taken on the life of [her character]" and "the chemistry between [her and her on-screen boyfriend] is instantly there while leaving you wanting more".

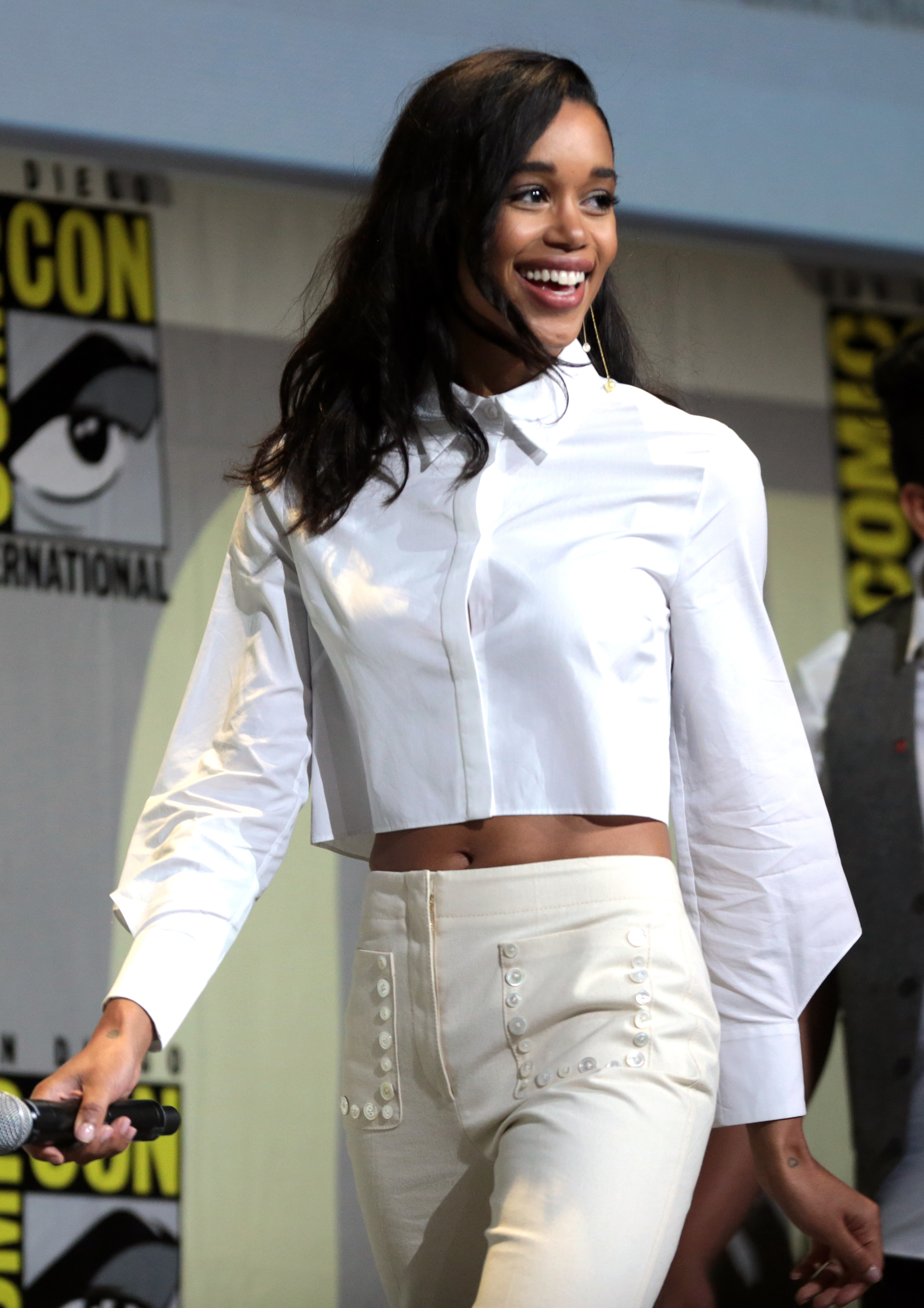
Harrier at the 2016 San Diego Comic-Con promoting Spider-Man: Homecoming

Harrier next guest starred as Amber in the television series Unforgettable (2014), and made her film debut in The Last Five Years (2014) as a young woman who has an affair with Jamie, Jeremy Jordan's character. She was cast in the AMC pilot Galyntine (2014), opposite Alycia Debnam-Carey, which was filmed but not taken to series. In 2015, she appeared in the film 4th Man Out, and in her last year at William Esper she was cast in Codes of Conduct, an HBO miniseries pilot created by Steve McQueen. Harrier considers this pilot to be her "first real job". The pilot was filmed but the series was canceled and never aired.

Harrier starred alongside Rowan Blanchard and Mahershala Ali in The Realest Real, a campaign film directed by Carrie Brownstein for luxury French fashion brand Kenzo in 2016. She also modeled for various campaigns for brands including Calvin Klein and Louis Vuitton, and became an ambassador for the latter and luxury Italian jewelry brand Bulgari.

In 2016, she also booked the role of Peter Parker's love interest Liz Allan in Spider-Man: Homecoming (2017). She did two auditions and then a screen test with Tom Holland before getting the role six weeks later. Her character was loosely based on the Marvel Comics character of the same name, and Harrier was given the creative freedom to create a modern version of the character. Spider-Man: Homecoming was Harrier's first blockbuster film, a box office success grossing over $880 million worldwide and receiving generally positive reviews. The film brought Harrier greater celebrity, while her performance was met with mixed reviews; some critics praised her for avoiding the damsel in distress trope and breaking barriers as the first love interest of color, and others were disappointed in her character's development and lack of screen time. In a negative review, Dana Schwartz of Marie Claire said, "Liz is always reactionary; she doesn't do anything ... [she] could literally be replaced by an object and ... the movie wouldn't change at all." Jim Vejvoda from IGN said "Harrier nicely plays against expectations". Mark Hughes wrote for Forbes that Harrier is a "welcome change to the usual romantic interests in superhero film" and plays Liz as a "likable, sympathetic, type-A person".

In June 2017, it was announced that Harrier would be portraying Millie Montag in Fahrenheit 451, HBO's film adaptation of the 1953 novel of the same name, opposite Michael B. Jordan; however, her scenes were later removed by the director, who decided the character did not fit with the storyline and wanted to shorten the film's runtime.

=== 2018–present: BlacKkKlansman and Hollywood ===
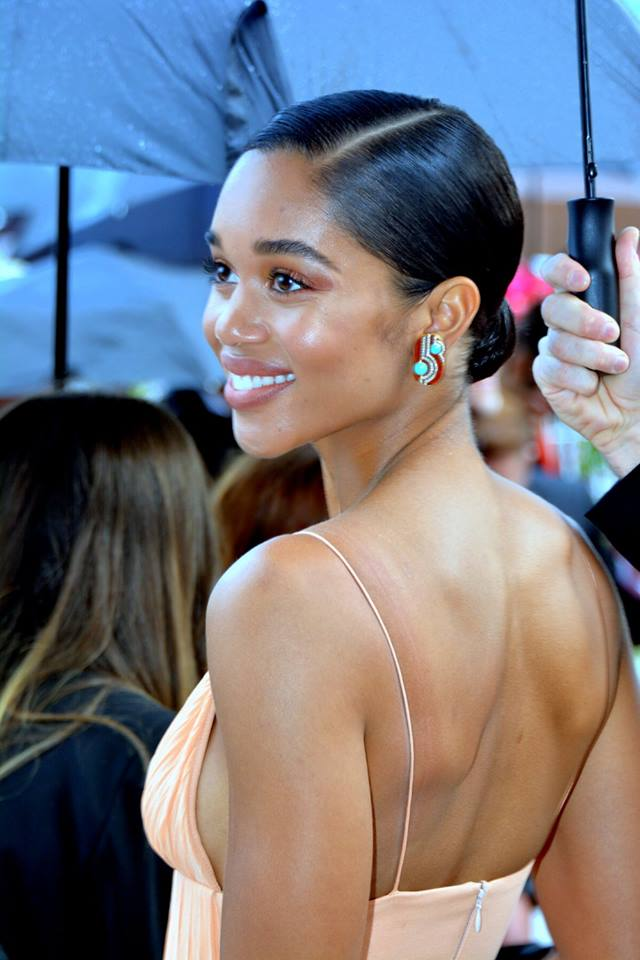
Harrier at the 2018 Cannes Film Festival for BlacKkKlansman

Harrier co-starred as Patrice Dumas, a civil rights activist, in the film BlacKkKlansman (2018) opposite John David Washington, Adam Driver, and Topher Grace. The film premiered at the Cannes Film Festival in May 2018, where it won the Grand Prix, and was theatrically released in August 2018. The director, Spike Lee, handpicked Harrier after seeing an audition tape she had done for another project. In preparation for the role, Harrier met with activist Kathleen Cleaver and other women who were in the Black Power movement; studied Angela Davis; and contacted people who were in the Black Student Union at Colorado College during the 1970s. She also spoke with her father, who dealt with racism while living in South Side, and as the only black student at his boarding school in Michigan; his ancestors were slaves. Harrier also attended several of Lee's classes at New York University where he is a film professor. For her performance, Harrier received positive reviews, and was nominated for a Black Reel Award and a Screen Actors Guild Award for Outstanding Performance by a Cast in a Motion Picture.

In 2019, director Jamie Adams offered Harrier the lead role in his film Balance, Not Symmetry; she accepted the part due to the project being mostly improvised and being good friends with Bria Vinaite, her co-star in the film. She plays Caitlyn Walker, an art student at the Glasgow School of Art, who is struggling with the recent death of her father. The film was a critical failure. Cath Clarke of The Guardian thought Harrier gave a "blank performance".

She starred in the Netflix miniseries Hollywood (2020) by Ryan Murphy as Camille Washington, an up-and-coming black actress facing prejudice during the Hollywood Golden Age in the post-World War II era. Harrier primarily drew inspiration for her role from actress Dorothy Dandridge, and to a lesser extent from singer and actress Lena Horne. To prepare for the Academy Award scene, Harrier studied Halle Berry's acceptance speech at the 74th Academy Awards. The series and Harrier's performance received mixed reviews, and some critics compared her performance unfavorably to her work in BlacKkKlansman. Darren Franich and Kristen Baldwin from Entertainment Weekly thought she was "so charismatic in BlacKkKlansman", but remarked "there’s no sign of that fire here". The Hollywood Reporter's Daniel Fienberg noted she "looks the part", but believed Camille was underdeveloped. Gabriel Tate from the i newspaper gave a positive review, regarding her "heartbreakingly convincing". In July 2020, Harrier played a young woman going through a breakup in the music video for "What's Love Got to Do with It", the remix version by Kygo of the original Tina Turner song. Harrier was cast in Finch (2021) with Tom Hanks, but her role was cut from the film; she was also cast in The Starling (2021) alongside Melissa McCarthy.

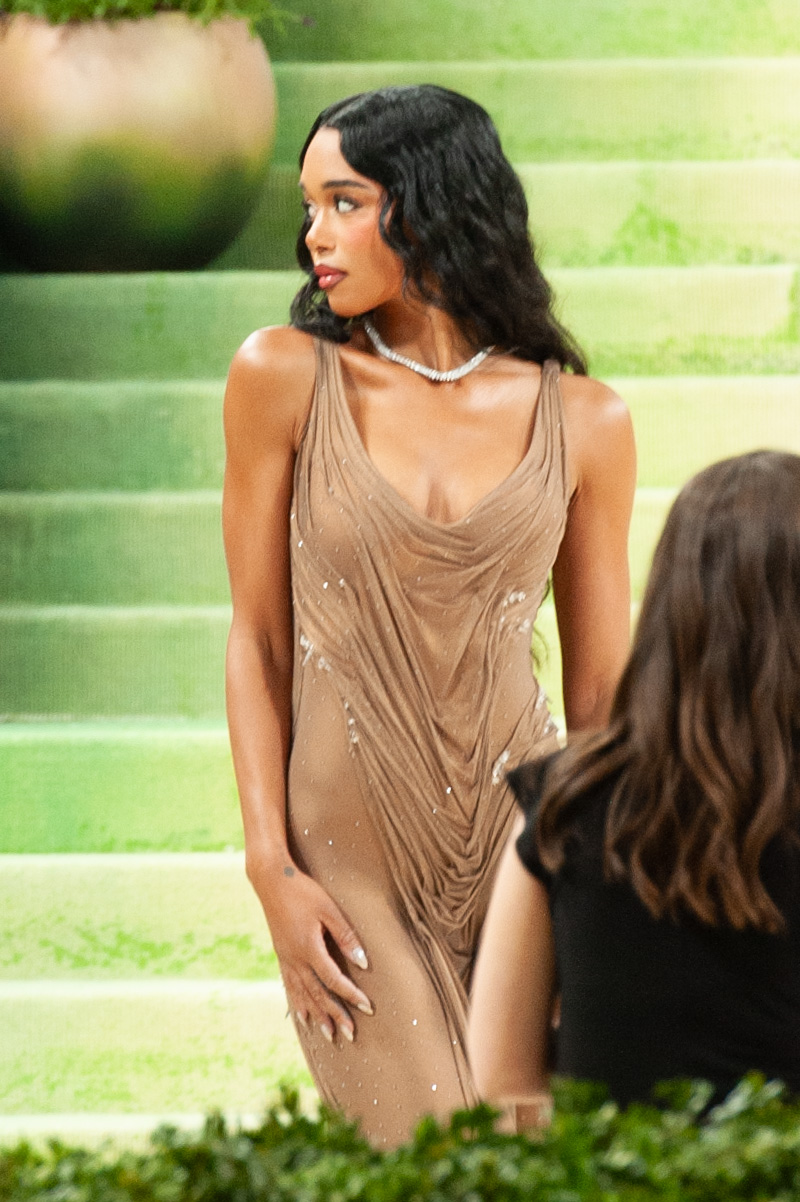
Harrier at the 2026 Met Gala

In 2022, Harrier appeared in the Hulu biographical miniseries Mike, based on the life of American boxer Mike Tyson. She lent her voice to the Netflix animated musical special Entergalactic, created by American rapper Kid Cudi as a visual companion to his album of the same name. In May 2022, Harrier was cast in a remake of Ron Shelton's 1992 film White Men Can't Jump for 20th Century Studios, which was released on May 13, 2023.

In 2026, she portrayed Motown executive Suzanne de Passe in the Michael Jackson biopic, Michael.

== Personal life ==
Harrier has been a vegetarian since she was eight years old. After graduating high school, Harrier moved to New York City in 2008, relocating to Los Angeles in 2019; she has said that she made the move to advance her career. Harrier is also a patron of the arts and exhibitions and collects art that decorates her home.

Harrier is a supporter of civil rights and advocates for issues such as intersectional feminism, transgender rights, gun control, gender equality, and representation for both Black people and people of color in general. She frequently uses her Instagram to call out injustices and has voiced support for Planned Parenthood and the American Civil Liberties Union. She was also one of the celebrity signatories for the Time's Up movement, and donated $1,000 to support the cause.

Harrier was in a relationship with American basketball player Klay Thompson from 2018 to early 2020.

She was in a relationship with French creative consultant Sam Jarou for four years. They were engaged in September 2022 but broke up in April 2025.

== Filmography ==
=== Film ===
Key
†	Denotes films that have not yet been released

Year	Title	Role	Notes
2014	The Last Five Years	Manuscript Woman	
2015	4th Man Out	Dorothy Cuda	
2016	The Realest Real	Abby	Short film
2017	Spider-Man: Homecoming	Liz Allan	
2018	BlacKkKlansman	Patrice Dumas	
2018	Fahrenheit 451	Mildred Montag	Deleted scenes
2019	Balance, Not Symmetry	Caitlin Walker	
2021	The Starling	Sherri	
2023	White Men Can't Jump	Tatiana	
2026	Michael	Suzanne de Passe	
2027	Lords of War †	TBA	Post-production
TBA	Strobe †	TBA	Post-production
TBA	The Technique †	TBA	Post-production
TBA	Wrong Number †	TBA	In production

=== Television ===
Year	Title	Role	Notes
2013	One Life to Live	Destiny Evans	Main cast
2014	Unforgettable	Amber	Episode: "The Island"
2020	Hollywood	Camille Washington	Miniseries, main cast
2021	Calls	Layla (voice)	Episode: "It's All in Your Head"
2022	Mike	Robin Givens	Episode: "The Lover"
2022	Entergalactic	Carmen (voice)	TV special
2024	Doctor Odyssey	Vivian Montgomery	Recurring role

== Awards and nominations ==
Year	Award	Category	Nominated work	Result	Ref.
2019	Black Reel Awards	Outstanding Breakthrough Performance, Female	BlacKkKlansman	Nominated	
2019	Screen Actors Guild Awards	Outstanding Performance by a Cast in a Motion Picture	BlacKkKlansman	Nominated	
