= Greg Tarzan Davis =

American actor

Greg Davis
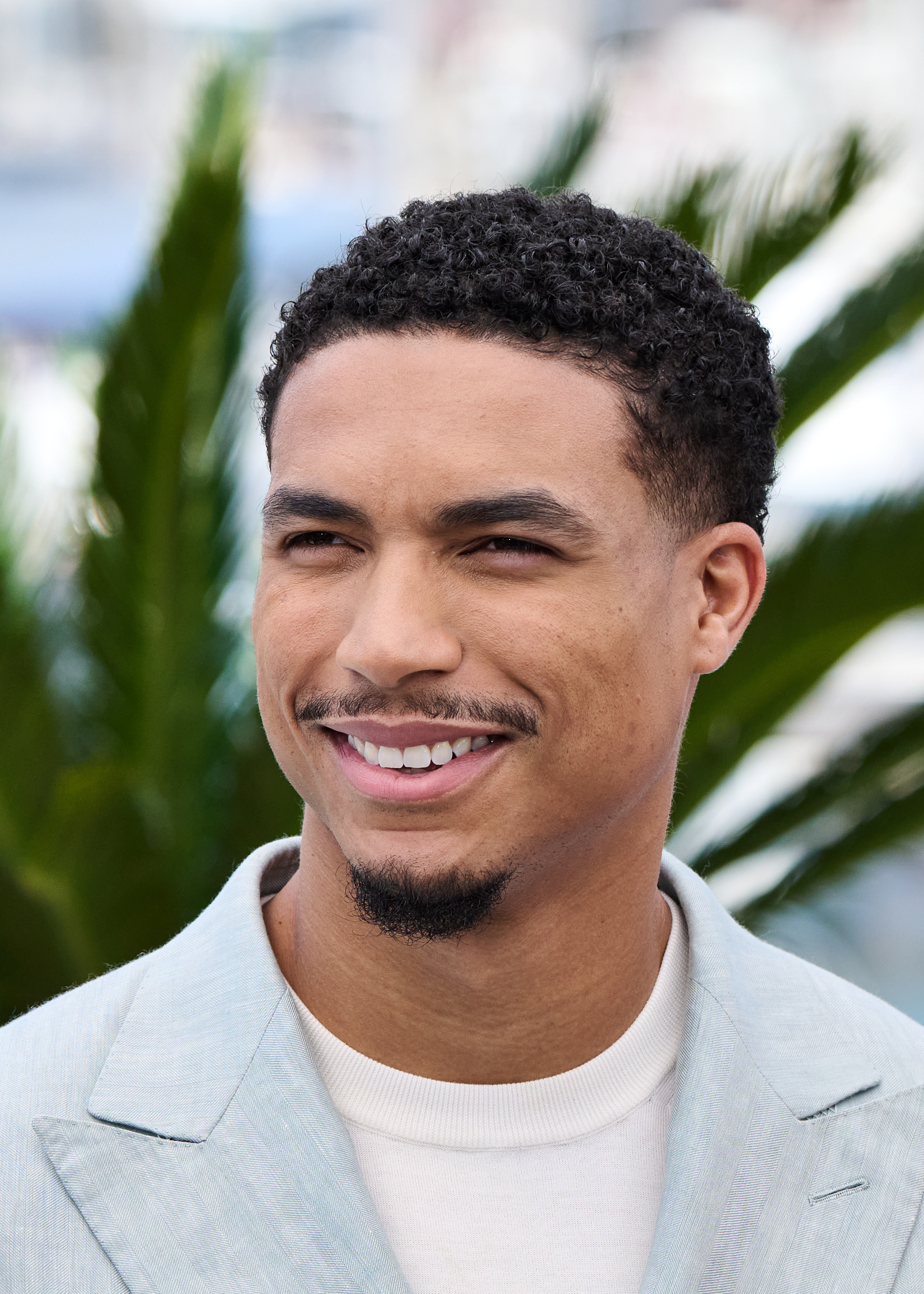
- Davis in 2025
- Born: 1993 or 1994 (age 32–33); New Orleans, Louisiana, U.S.
- Education: Louisiana State University
- Occupation: Actor
- Years active: 2017–present

Greg Tarzan Davis (born 1993 or 1994) is an American actor. He began in theater, moved to Los Angeles, and started his acting career. In 2022, he played the role of Javy "Coyote" Machado in the Top Gun: Maverick film. In 2021, he received a recurring role on ABC's series Grey's Anatomy. He also had a supporting role in the horror film Tales from the Hood 2 (2018).

== Career ==
Before becoming an actor, Davis worked as an elementary school teacher. In 2018, he moved to Los Angeles to focus on his acting career. He took his childhood nickname, "Tarzan," which he earned due to his energy and long hair, as part of his professional name. He played Kahad in the horror-comedy direct-to-video anthology film Tales from the Hood 2. Davis recently recurred on Freeform's Good Trouble and had a guest-starring role in CBS's All Rise.

In May 2021, Davis signed with ICM Partners. In December 2021, it was announced that Davis has joined the cast of ABC's medical drama series Grey's Anatomy. It was his first major role; he portrays Dr. Jordan Wright, who is from Minnesota, the favorite of Dr. Nick Marsh (Scott Speedman), and crosses paths with main character Meredith Grey (Ellen Pompeo).

Davis portrayed Lieutenant Javy "Coyote" Machado in the 2022 film Top Gun: Maverick. Davis then starred as Theo Degas in the 2023 film Mission: Impossible – Dead Reckoning Part One, and reprise his role in Mission: Impossible – The Final Reckoning (2025).

== Personal life ==
Davis was born in New Orleans, Louisiana. He has a background in martial arts and holds a second-degree black belt in Taekwondo. Davis attended Louisiana State University and earned a degree in elementary education.

== Filmography ==
=== Films ===
Key
†	Denotes films that have not yet been released

Year	Title	Role	Notes
2017	Woke	Brandon Ferguson	Short film
2017	Controversy	Pharaoh Pittman	TV movie
2018	Tales from the Hood 2	Kahad	
2020	The Call of the Wild	Orchard Worker	
2022	Top Gun: Maverick	Lieutenant Javy "Coyote" Machado	
2023	Mission: Impossible – Dead Reckoning Part One	Theo Degas	
2025	Mission: Impossible – The Final Reckoning	Theo Degas	
2027	Lords of War †		Post-production
TBA	Snare †	Shawn	Post-production

=== Television series ===
Year	Title	Role	Notes
2017	Chicago P.D.	Reece	Episode: "Don't Bury This Case"
2019	Grand Hotel	Jones	Episode: "Curveball"
2020	All Rise	Freddie Davidson	Episode: "The Tale of Three Arraignments"
2020–2021	Good Trouble	Zion	Episodes: "Truths and Dares", "Trap Heals", "Capoeira" (uncredited)
2021–2022	Grey's Anatomy	Dr. Jordan Wright	Recurring role
