= Omar Sharif Jr. =

Canadian actor

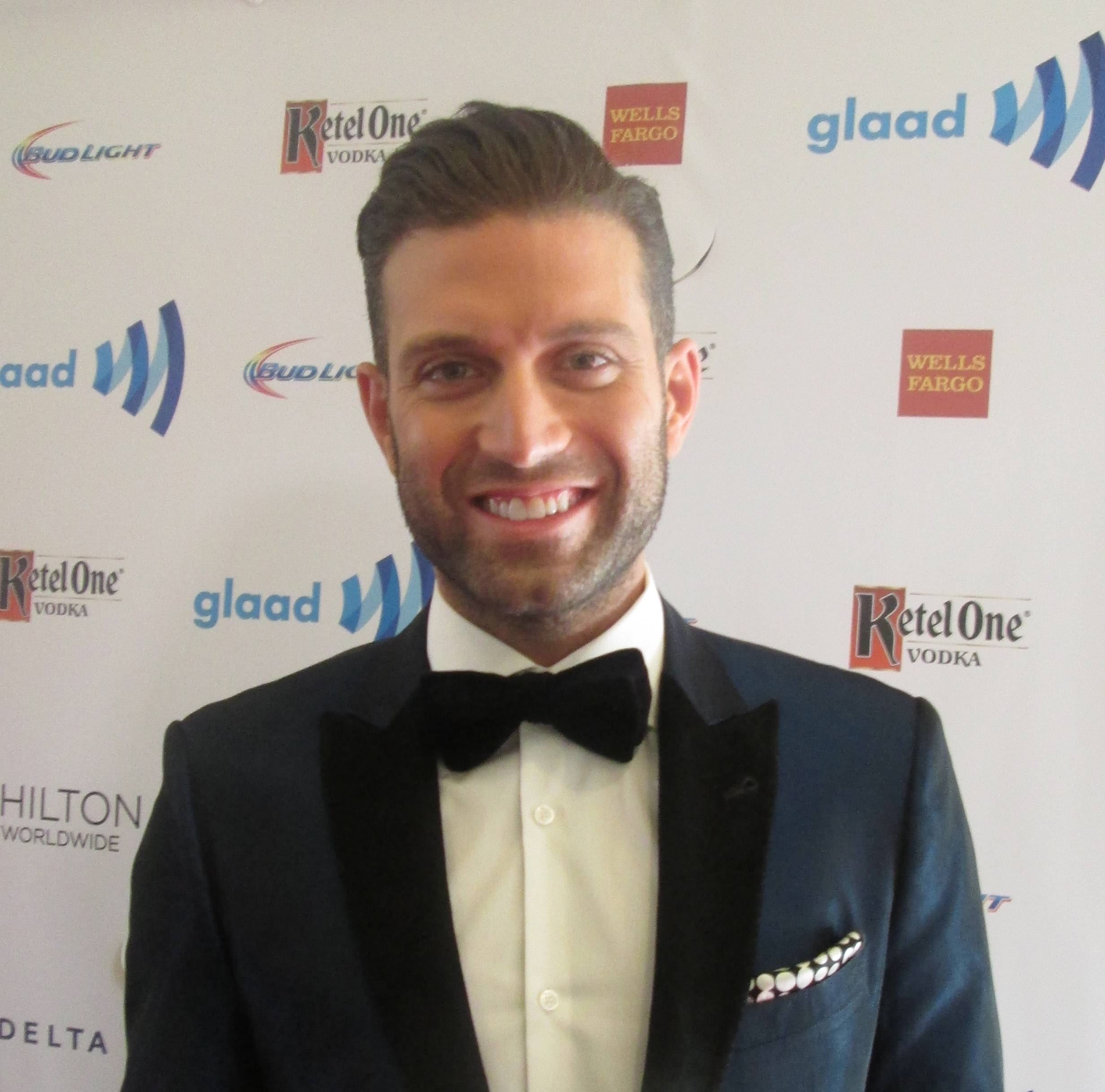
- Sharif in 2014
- Born: Omar Sharif Jr. 28 November 1983 (age 42); Montreal, Quebec, Canada
- Education: Queen's University; London School of Economics
- Occupations: Actor; Model; Author; Gay activist
- Years active: 2000–present
- Relatives: Omar Sharif (grandfather); Faten Hamama (grandmother)

Omar Sharif Jr. (Arabic: عمر الشريف الابن; born 28 November 1983) is a Canadian actor, model, author and gay activist who lives in the United States.

== Early life ==
Sharif is the son of a Jewish Canadian mother, Debbie, and an Egyptian father, Tarek Sharif. His paternal grandparents were Omar Sharif and Faten Hamama, both Egyptian actors; his maternal grandparents were Jewish Holocaust survivors. During his childhood, Sharif was shuttled back and forth among Montreal, Paris, and Cairo. He has a B.A. from Queen's University, a Master's in Comparative Politics from the London School of Economics and a degree in Performing Arts from The Lee Strasberg Institute.

== Career ==
Sharif has worked as an actor, appearing in the 2000 Egyptian miniseries Wagh el qamar, the 2005-06 French-language Canadian series Virginie, the 2008 Egyptian film Hassan wa Morcus and the 2016 Irish film The Secret Scripture. When he became an actor, his grandfather said to him: "I gave you my name, I gave you my looks. I'm not going to give you anything else. You have to do it entirely on your own."

He appeared in the 2017 short film 11th Hour, which was selected for screening at the Tribeca Film Festival.

He has also worked as a model: He was "the face of Coca-Cola for the Arab world and appeared in a major Calvin Klein print campaign in Egypt."

He was a presenter at the 83rd Academy Awards in 2011, during which he performed a memorable comedic sketch with Kirk Douglas.

== Activism ==
In 2012, Sharif came out as gay in The Advocate, a gay news magazine. Noting that the recent parliamentary elections in Egypt had "dealt secularists a particularly devastating blow," he stated that the vision of "a freer, more equal Egypt — a vision that many young patriots gave their lives to see realized in Tahrir Square — has been hijacked." He is said to be "the first public personality to ever come out as openly gay in the Arab World." His announcement led to widespread criticism and threats of violence.

From 2013 to 2015, he was the National Spokesperson for the Gay and Lesbian Alliance Against Defamation (GLAAD).

In an August 2015 interview, Sharif said that his recently deceased grandfather, Omar Sharif, had been aware of his homosexuality and had never had a problem with it, though his mother did; she told him "Don't tell your grandmother, this would kill her." He responded, "She survived Auschwitz and Buchenwald but this would kill her?"

He also said he hoped to change Egyptian attitudes toward gay people. "I'm a son, I'm a brother, I'm a coworker, I'm a friend," he said. "I'm not a fact, or a figure, or a statistic. I'm not a moral or an ethical debate."

Sharif gave a speech at the 2016 Oslo Freedom Forum discussing his coming out story during the Arab Spring and admitting to suicidal thoughts.

After the Sultan of Brunei passed a law to stone homosexual people in April 2019, Sharif Jr. challenged him a few days later, saying "If the Sultan would execute his own homosexual son, Sharif Jr. would execute himself as well".

== Personal life ==
As of 2012 he was living in Cairo, however shortly thereafter, uneasy about the "new Egypt," he left the country. He now resides in Los Angeles.

== Filmography ==
=== Television ===
Year	Title	Role	Network	Notes
2020	Beauty and the Baker	George – Hollywood Agent	Keshet Studios	(20 episodes)
2018	Mélange	Zayn Hadid	pilot	(1 episode)
2017	The Naked Truth	Himself – Narrator	Fusion TV	"China Queer" (1 episode)
2015	Cocktails & Classics	Himself	Logo TV	"Funny Girl" (1 episode)
2011	Pânico na TV	Himself	RedeTV!	(1 episode)
2011	83rd Academy Awards	Himself – Trophy Presenter	ABC	(special)
2005-06	Virginie	Oliver Brisebois	Télévision de Radio-Canada	(30 episodes)
2000	Wajh al-Qamar	Amun	multiple Arabic television channels	(16 episodes)

=== Film ===
Year	Title	Role	Notes
2016	The Secret Scripture	Daniel O'Brien	
2026	Corporate Retreat	Ken	
TBA	Snare	Jones	Filming

== Bibliography ==
- A Tale of Two Omars: A Memoir of Family, Revolution, and Coming Out During the Arab Spring (5 October 2021), ISBN 978-1-640-09498-7

== Honors and awards ==
He was honored as one of the "Out 100" in 2012," The Advocate's "40 Under 40" in 2014 and 2015, and won Attitude Magazine's 'Inspiration Award' in 2016.
