= Jason Zada =

American screenwriter

- Born: California, United States
- Occupations: Film director; Music video director; Screenwriter; Digital marketer; Digital marketing director
- Employer: Tool of North America (2009–2014)
- Known for: spyplane.com (1997–1999) (co-founder); Evolution Bureau (2000–2008) (co-founder)
- Notable work: Elf Yourself website and marketing campaign; Take This Lollipop interactive short horror film
- Website: www.jasonzada.com

Jason Zada is an American film director, music video director, screenwriter and digital marketeer, best known for Elf Yourself, an interactive viral holiday season campaign for OfficeMax, and for Take This Lollipop, an interactive horror short film created to raise awareness of the danger of placing too much personal information online.

== Background ==
Zada was born in California and moved to Hawaii when he was 10 years old. His interest in video and computers started when he was a young boy. When he was 8 years old, he created short films on a Super 8 camera and programmed text adventure games on a Commodore 64 personal computer. He received a media arts education at Kalaheo High School in Kailua, Hawaii. Returning to the continental US, he worked in Los Angeles and New York City before moving to San Francisco in 1993. Not a fan of organized education, Zada declined scholarships to film school, preferring to go out and learn things on his own. In 1997, he and co-founder Greg Hipwell launched the website skyplane.com, which was acquired by Zefer in 1999.

Zada currently lives in Mill Valley, California, with his wife and children.

== Career ==
In 2000, Zada and partner Daniel Stein co-founded the San Francisco-based digital advertising agency Evolution Bureau (EVB). The company's growth as a full-service agency allowed him, as the firm's Executive Creative Director, to direct advertising campaigns for clients for television and the internet. In 2006, Omnicom Group bought a 50% interest in the firm. By 2008, EVB had grown to a 65-person company and Zada allowed Omnicom to acquire a majority stake in the company, and at the end of 2008, Zada left the company to pursue a career as a video and film director. Zada signed with film production company Tool of Northern America (TNA) in January 2009 and commutes between his Mill Valley home and Los Angeles.

In 2024 Zada founded Secret Level, an AI video production studio. For the holiday seasons of 2024 and 2025 Secret Level worked with Coca-Cola to generate their Christmas advertisements, which called back to the original 1995 "Holidays are Coming" ads. In response to social media backlash surrounding these videos, Zada defended the use of AI in Coke's ads, saying "A lot of the people complaining last year were from the creative industry who were just afraid — afraid for their jobs, afraid for what it did. But I think the spot tested really well and average people really enjoyed it."

== Projects ==
In 2006, Zada and Evolution Bureau, in collaboration with advertising company "Toy." of New York, developed the Elf Yourself interactive holiday viral marketing campaign for OfficeMax. The Elf Yourself interactive website allows visitors to upload pictures of themselves, or their friends, which they can then see on the dancing elfs. Originally with only one elf, the campaign was first used during the holiday season, beginning in November 2006, and returned each holiday season afterwards. When first released, it was a surprise hit and exceeded production's expectations with more than 194 million views in six weeks, and received the interactive involvement of more than 123 million people who uploaded photos of themselves to be seen on the Christmas elves. Beginning in 2007, the site used four elves and viewers could upload different images for each one.

In 2011, Zada wrote and directed Take This Lollipop as both an interactive horror short film and a Facebook application, using the Facebook Connect app to allow viewers to bring themselves into the film using pictures and messages from their own Facebook profile. Originally intended as a social experiment, Zada admits he "threw the script together" in approximately 30 minutes, and completed the project in four weeks along with developer Jason Nickel and the collaborative efforts of Tool of North America. In November, 2011, "Take This Lollipop" was noted as the fastest-growing Facebook application.

Zada TNA worked with Australia's Tourism Victoria and directed the crowdfunded "Remote Control Tourist" which, over a five-day period in October 2013, allowed potential Melbourne visitors to virtually explore the city using social media. Zada stated "Hundreds of photos, videos, and data will come to life and give anyone who is thinking of visiting or is currently visiting Melbourne the coolest and most interesting way to research and explore the city."

Zada helmed the 2016 film The Forest. Game of Thrones star Natalie Dormer and Taylor Kinney starred, and Focus Features has the North American distribution rights to the film, which was Zada's feature film directorial debut.

== Recognition ==
In speaking toward Elf Yourself in his book Adland: Searching for the Meaning of Life on a Branded Planet, author James P. Othmer called it "a strange, corny, yet enormously successful website." He observed that while 19 other sites created for OfficeMax had modest success, it was "nothing like the level of action that came out of the Elf Yourself site," and that, as created by Zada, the site "not only transcended the online genre; it transcended advertising and became the kind of cultural event that marketers dream of".

Zada's Take This Lollipop project has been the recipient of positive media attention, receiving national publicity, such as in Adland, Brandchannel, CNN, IndieWire, Forbes, Digital Trends, Adweek, The Star-Ledger, GlobalPost, The New York Times, Advertising Age, and has garnered international attention with coverage by newspapers and magazines including The Sydney Morning Herald. 20minutes, Sky Italia, Les Numeriques, TendanceOuest, Stern Magazine, Site Oueb. and International Business Times,. The project has sparked discussions over how to protect children when they are using the internet, with coverage from The New Zealand Herald, CNN, and Persoenlich. In a commentary on how parents must educate their children about the dangers inherent in a releasing of personal information about themselves to the internet, CNN reported that the film took the worst fears about posting personal information on the internet, and turned them into "two minutes of horror." and later reported that "Behind the litany of frightening facts and figures (not to mention fears like those preyed upon in viral-video Take This Lollipop, an interactive horror film that incorporates text and images from your Facebook profile) lurks a disturbing truth."

Zada has won over 70 industry awards and has been recognized by Adweek, Creativity Magazine, Shoot Magazine, Communication Arts, The New York Times, Contagious Magazine as well as many other magazines, newspapers and books.

=== Awards and nominations ===
- 2004, Cannes Cyber Lion award for Wrigley's Winterfresh for Winterfresh Network
- 2005, Internet Advertising Awards Competition, 'Best in Show' for Redwood Creek
- 2006, ADDY Award for Adidas Basketball for Step Inside KG
- 2006, Cannes Cyber Lion award for Burger King's The Whopperettes
- 2006, London International Awards, 'Best Interactive Media', Orbit White, for Good Clean Feeling
- 2006, SXSW award for LeapFrog Fly Pentop Computer
- 2007, Ad:Tech Awards, 'Best Integrated Campaign', Adidas Soccer MLS Mashups
- 2008, Ad:Tech Awards, 'Best of Show', OfficeMax, Elf Yourself
- 2008, SXSW award for OfficeMax Elf Yourself
- 2012, Advertising Age's '2012 Creativity 50'

Take This Lollipop

- March 2012, won Overall 'Best in Show', and First Place 'Experimental' at SXSW
- April 2012, won D&AD Award for 'Digital Advertising/Web Films'
- April 2012, nominated for Andy Award for 'Agency Innovation'
- April 2012, won Webby Award for 'Online Guerilla & Innovation'
- April 2012, nominated for three Webby Awards under categories 'Viral', 'Experimental and Weird', and 'Viral Marketing',
- May 2012, won Bronze Clio Award for 'Self Promotion, Interactive'
- May 2012, won two One Show Interactive Awards 'Gold Pencils': for 'Best Use of Scocial Media' and 'Gold Pencil' for 'Interactive Advertising Self-Promotion'.
- May 2012, won Art Directors Club 'Silver Cube' award for 'Online Content'.
- May 2012, nominated for Daytime Emmy Award for 'New Approaches - Daytime Entertainment'.
- May 2012, nominated for four AICP Awards: 'Integrated Campaign', 'Website/Microsite', 'Cause Marketing', and 'Social'

Remote Control Tourist

- 2013, won Favourite Website Awards 'site of the day'
- 2013, won Bronze Award for 'Technical Achievement' at SXSW
- 2014, won Gold Prix awards for 'Direct Content' and for 'Branded Content & Entertainment' at Singapore's Spikes Asia Festival
- 2014, won 'Best in Show' and two Gold Awards ('Interactive Film' and for 'Creative Innovation'), two Silver Awards ('Branded Content' and 'Digital Campaign'), and seven Bronze Awards in several 'film and video and digital' categories from the 'Australasian Writers and Art Directors Association'
- 2014, won Webby Award for 'Best Social Media Campaign'
- 2014, won five 'Bronze Cyber Lions' awards at Cannes Lions International Festival of Creativity.
- 2014, won 'The Innovation Award', and award for 'Most Effective Use of Content', as well as commendations 'Art Direction', 'Branded Content', 'Data Visualisation', and for 'Digital Website & Microsites' ADMA awards from Australian Creativity & Effectiveness Awards for Marketing, Media, & Advertising
- 2014, won Gold 'Best Content Creation Award' at C Squared Festival of Media
- 2014, won first place 'Innovation Award' from F.I.T.C.
- 2014, won 'Advertising Annual Award for Digital Advertising' from Communication Arts
- 2012, won 'Next Award', category 'Experimental' from Association of Independent Commercial Producers
