= Showbox (disambiguation) =

Showbox is a South Korean film production and distribution company.

Showbox may also refer to:

- ShowBox, an Indian music channel
- Showbox.com, a video streaming and download platform
- The Showbox, a music venue in Seattle
