= Sherman's March (disambiguation) =

Sherman's March was a military campaign of the American Civil War in 1864.

Sherman's March may also refer to:

- Sherman's March (1986 film), a documentary by Ross McElwee
- Sherman's March, a 2000 discontinued pilot aired as a TV movie, starring Reiko Aylesworth
- Sherman's March (2007 film), a History Channel docudrama
