= Hannah Levien =

Australian actress and writer

- Born: Australia
- Occupations: Actress, writer
- Known for: The Magicians as Victoria; Siren as Janine; Brand New Cherry Flavor as Christine

Hannah Levien is an Australian actress and writer. Her first performance in a feature film was in the award-winning Australian revenge-thriller The Horseman playing teenage runaway Jesse Forteski. She is best known for roles as Calliope in Supernatural and as Victoria in the Syfy fantasy series The Magicians, and as Janine in Freeform's thriller, Siren.

== Early life ==
Levien grew up in Brisbane, Australia, where she attended drama school and began her acting career working in theatre. She completed her master's in screenwriting and directing at the University of Sydney. She is a recipient of the prestigious Arts Queensland Professional Development Award that enabled her to study under American acting coach, Ivana Chubbuck in Los Angeles.

== Career ==
Levien began her foray into film with the acclaimed revenge-thriller, The Horseman, as runaway teenager, Jesse Forteski. Directed and written by Steven Kastrissios, the film went on to be shown at various film festivals around the world, including South by South West Film Festival, and won awards for best directing and best film at the Melbourne Underground Film Festival.

Levien was headhunted by a manager in 2011 to work in Los Angeles and was promptly cast in the film Children of Sorrow, alongside lead actor Bill Oberst Jr. Levein plays Ellen, a young woman who enters a cult to find answers into the mysterious disappearance of her sister. The film won multiple awards in the categories of Best Feature Film and Best Actor at the Sacramento Horror Film Festival and the Shockfest Film Festival in 2012.

After accepting roles in American shows Supernatural, The Magicians and Bates Motel, that are all filmed in Vancouver, Canada, Levien eventually made the decision to base herself between Los Angeles and Vancouver, where she could continue her exploration of sci-fi and fantasy genres.

Levien played the character of Victoria in the first and third seasons of The Magicians, and as character Janine in fantasy drama series Siren, on Disney’s Freeform channel. Siren premiered on 29 March 2018 and is based on a story by Eric Wald and Dean White, who both serve as Executive Producers.

In 2021, Levien starred in TV miniseries Brand New Cherry Flavor on Netflix as the character Christine Woods.

== Filmography ==
=== Film ===
Year	Title	Role	Notes
2006	A Day with Ray Ray	Auditionee	Short film
2006	Sweet FA	Holly Willis	Feature film
2007	Counter		Short film
2007	DisPretty	Rose	Short film
2008	Carnies	Jess	Short film
2008	The Horseman	Jesse Forteski	Feature film
2008	Ready. Fire. Aim.	Cupid	Short film
2008	Last Breath	Lydia	Video short
2009	Thirty Second Love	Erica	Short film
2010	The Perfect Boyfriend	Woman	Short film
2010	Porphyria	Woman	Video short
2011	The Later Guests	Amanda	Short film
2011	The Mort Eclectic	Various	Video short
2011	Oprah's Last Show	Assistant	Video short
2012	The Devout	Emery	Short film
2012	Children of Sorrow	Ellen	Feature film
2012	Keys	Mary	Short film
2012	Dismantled	Eliza	Short film
2013	Dystopia	Laura	Short film
2013	The Mirror	Ellen Long	Feature film
2014	Mega Shark Versus Mecha Shark	Sandy	Feature film
2014	OKI - In the Middle of the Ocean	Wylie	Feature film
2015	New Earth on the Barrens	Meghan	Short film
2015	Blood Brothers	Genevieve Dubois / Vanity	Feature film
2016	Another Time	Alison	Short film
2018	Hunting Season	Callie	Short film
2020	Wytch Craft	Epiphany	Short film
2022	Tiger by the Tail	Cadence	Short film
2023	13th Summer	Vee Byrnes	Feature film
2024	The Muse	The Photographer	Short film

=== Television ===
Year	Title	Role	Notes
2011	The Palace Players	Princess Miranda	1 episode
2013	The Kill Corporation	Francine	1 episode
2013	The Ghost Speaks	Belle Gunness	1 episode
2014	Supernatural	Calliope	1 episode
2015	Backstrom	Laura Hausberg	1 episode
2015	The Returned	Marie	2 episodes
2016	Bates Motel	Portland Mom	1 episode
2016	The Other Newsroom	Madison 'Mad' McHaney	TV movie
2016–2018	The Magicians	Victoria Gradley	Seasons 1 & 3, 7 episodes
2018	Colony	Claire	1 episode
2018	Reverie	Naomi Lenton	1 episode
2018	UnREAL	Mistress Carver	1 episode
2018	The Wrong Patient	Wendy	TV movie
2018–2020	Siren	Janine	21 episodes
2019	The Dating List	Beatrice	TV movie
2020	Exit, Stage Death	Laura Dauphrain	TV movie
2021	Zoey's Extraordinary Playlist	Amanda	1 episode
2021	Brand New Cherry Flavor	Christine Woods	Miniseries, 7 episodes
2022	Reginald the Vampire	Eve	3 episodes

== Stage ==
Year	Title	Role	Notes
2007	The Year Nick McGowan Came to Stay		Roundhouse Theatre, Brisbane with La Boite Theatre Company
2008	Hollow Crossing		Sue Benner Theatre, Brisbane with Metro Arts & Markwell Presents
