= Black Water Vampire =

- Directed by: Evan Tramel
- Written by: Evan Tramel
- Produced by: Jesse Baget
- Starring: Bill Oberst Jr., Danielle Lozeau, Andrea Monier, Anthony Fanelli
- Edited by: Evan Tramel
- Music by: Richard Figone
- Production companies: BWV Productions, Ruthless Pictures
- Distributed by: Image Entertainment
- Release date: January 24, 2014
- Running time: 82 minutes
- Country: United States
- Language: English

Black Water Vampire (also known as The Black Water Vampire) is a 2014 found footage horror film directed and written by Evan Tramel and starring Bill Oberst Jr., Danielle Lozeau, Andrea Monier, and Anthony Fanelli. The film was released direct to DVD on January 24, 2014 through Image Entertainment and stars Bill Oberst Jr. The film's plot follows a film group's attempt to document a series of murders.

== Plot ==
Every ten years for the last forty years, a woman's body is discovered in the woods outside of Black Water, drained of blood and bearing mysterious bite marks. Raymond Banks (Bill Oberst Jr.) has been convicted of the crime, but Black Water resident Danielle (Danielle Lozeau) doesn't believe that he's the murderer. Hoping to prove his innocence and thus get Raymond off of death row, Danielle convinces her friends Andrea (Andrea Monier) and Rob (Robin Steffen) to venture out into the woods to search for evidence. They hire Anthony (Anthony Fanelli) to film their search, which quickly turns bizarre when they begin to hear stories about supernatural creatures, as well as being creeped out by the strange townspeople. Despite Rob's misgivings, the group begins a three-day hike to see where one of the bodies was discovered, only to get lost in the process.

On their third day of hiking, they finally find the location where the fourth and last body was found, but suddenly realize that they have lost Rob. After searching for him for several hours, the three are forced to give up and set up camp. During the night, they hear noises outside the tent. When they go to investigate, they are attacked by a nosferatu-esque vampire creature. The creature drags off Danielle. Andrea wants to save her, but Anthony insists they try and escape. In the morning, Anthony and Andrea come across Danielle, naked and visibly traumatized. Danielle claims that there is something inside her, and this is proven true when she is revealed to be impregnated with something.

After trying and failing to convince Andrea to abandon the deteriorating Danielle, Anthony becomes exasperated and ditches the girls, only to be attacked and killed by the vampire seconds later. Several hours later, Danielle and Andrea find the camera on the ground. They quickly become surrounded by several motionless townspeople holding guns. The two girls get split up and Andrea hides in Raymond Banks' house. However, the vampire finds her in the house and she runs back outside. Andrea reunites with Danielle, but their joy is momentary, as seconds later the vampire appears and rips out Andrea's throat while Danielle flees in terror. She is then accosted by the townspeople who hold her down while whatever is in her stomach begins to burst out.

The final scene is of the townspeople attending a party for a baby's first birthday party. The person filming pans the camera across Danielle's lifeless face before landing on the baby in its crib, which is revealed to be an infant vampire. After this shot, the film ends.

== Cast ==
- Danielle Lozeau as Danielle Mason
- Andrea Monier as Andrea
- Anthony Fanelli as Anthony
- Robin Steffen as Rob
- Bill Oberst Jr. as Raymond Banks

== Production ==
Filming took place during 2013 in Big Bear, California over a fifteen-day period. Of the film, producer Jesse Baget commented that he was "surprised that there hadn't been a ‘found footage’ vampire film done" and that he was intrigued by the idea of creating a film about a "monster vampire that didn't have time for words".

== Reception ==
Critical reception has been mixed to negative. Shock Till You Drop and JoBlo.com both criticized the film for being too derivative of earlier works such as The Blair Witch Project and The Last Exorcism, but commented that the film did have some entertainment value. HorrorNews.net gave the film a favorable review, saying that while people would compare the film to The Blair Witch Project, that they felt that Black Water Vampire was stronger than the earlier film.
