= Children of Sorrow =

- Directed by: Jourdan McClure
- Written by: Ryan Finnerty
- Produced by: Doug Archibald
- Starring: Bill Oberst Jr., Hannah Levien, Whitney Nielsen
- Cinematography: Dmitry Koshutin
- Edited by: Josh Earl
- Production company: After Dark Films
- Distributed by: Lionsgate Home Entertainment
- Release date: October 6, 2012 (Sacramento Horror Film Festival)
- Running time: 88 minutes
- Country: United States
- Language: English

Children of Sorrow is a 2012 horror film directed by Jourdan McClure and part of the After Dark Originals series. The movie had its world release on October 6, 2012 at the Sacramento Horror Film Festival and was released to DVD on March 4, 2014 through Lionsgate Home Entertainment. The film stars Bill Oberst Jr. as a twisted cult leader.

== Synopsis ==
Desperate to discover what has become of her sister Janet, Ellen (Hannah Levien) infiltrates Simon Leach's (Bill Oberst Jr.) cult. All she knows is that her sister was last seen joining his group to find herself, only to go missing after joining. Ellen is welcomed with open arms and although her initial intent is to search for her sister, she finds herself drawn to Simon's magnetic personality and message of love and acceptance. However what she soon discovers is that she, along with all of the cult's companionship-hungry members, is being manipulated to a more sinister and dark end than she could have predicted.

== Cast ==
- Bill Oberst Jr. as Simon Leach
- Hannah Levien as Ellen
- Whitney Nielsen as Mary
- Galen Howard as Alan
- Liesel Hanson as Robin
- Peabo Powell as Frank
- Daniel Mentz as Evan
- Jaquelyn Johnson as Tracey
- Rachel Orlikoff as Grace
- Martha Brigham as Veronica
- Nich Kauffman as Ben
- Jefferson Rogers as Brian

== Reception ==
Fearnet gave Children of Sorrow a mixed review, praising Oberst as one of the film's highlights while commenting that the film did "sag in the middle". Film School Rejects panned the film overall, remarking that it "reveals the ending in the first few minutes, has a nonsensical screenplay, and is edited like a narrative film thus defeating the purpose of the found footage format". The reviewer also noted that "For what it’s worth, the director of the film claims it isn’t found-footage, so there’s that."

=== Awards ===
- Best Actor Award at the Shockfest Film Festival (2012, won - Bill Oberst Jr)
- The Shocker Award at the Shockfest Film Festival (2012, won)
- Best Feature at the Sacramento Horror Film Festival (2012, won)
- Best Acting in a Feature at the Sacramento Horror Film Festival (2012, won)
