= Nick Antosca =

American writer (born 1983)

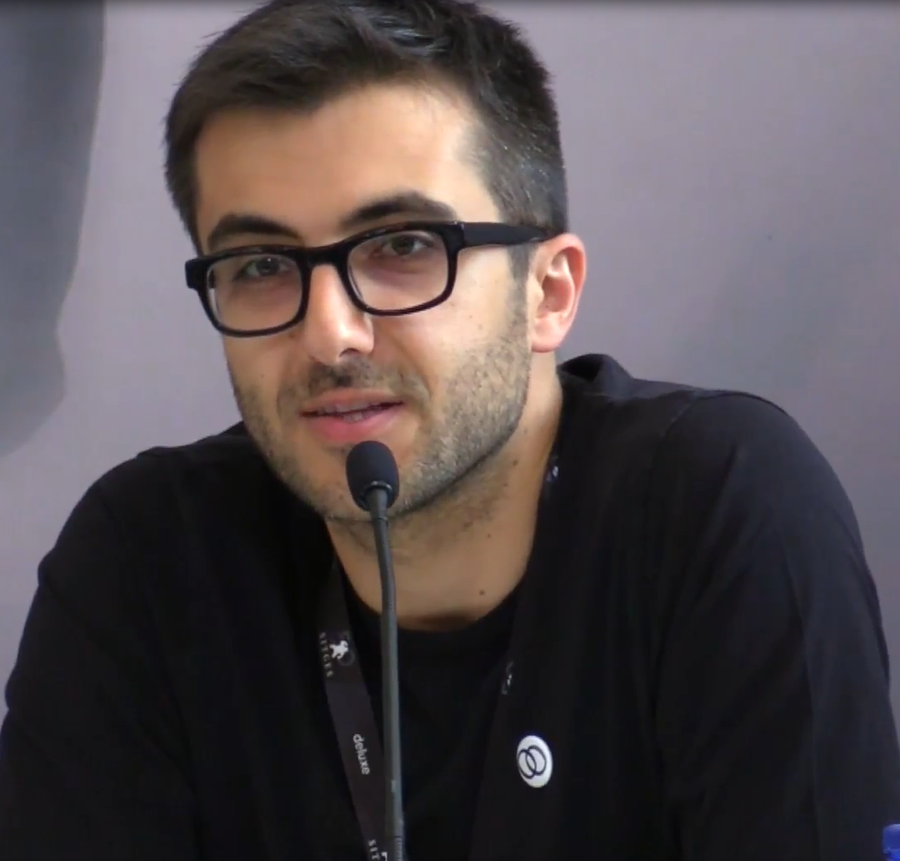
- Antosca in 2018
- Born: Nicholas J. Antosca; January 23, 1983 (age 43); New Orleans, Louisiana, U.S.
- Education: Yale University
- Occupations: Novelist; screenwriter; producer
- Writing career
- Period: 2006–present
- Notable works: Channel Zero; A Friend of the Family; Brand New Cherry Flavor; The Act; Cape Fear
- Notable awards: Shirley Jackson Award for Best Novella, 2009

Nicholas J. Antosca (born January 23, 1983) is an American film and television writer, producer, and novelist. He is the creator and showrunner of Channel Zero, Cape Fear, and A Friend of the Family. He also co-created and showran Hulu's The Act (2019) and Netflix's Brand New Cherry Flavor (2021).

== Career ==
As a television writer, he created the Syfy horror anthology series Channel Zero and the Hulu crime anthology The Act. He also co-produced 13 episodes of the horror series Hannibal. His short story "The Quiet Boy", published in the January 2019 issue of Guernica magazine, was the basis for the 2021 film Antlers.

Antosca was in a screenwriting partnership for several years with novelist Ned Vizzini, who died in 2013.

In January 2020, Syfy greenlit Chucky, a TV series continuation of the Child's Play franchise from creator Don Mancini, with Antosca set to executive produce.

In November 2019, it was announced that Antosca would be credited as a co-creator, writer, executive producer alongside Lenore Zion in the Netflix horror drama miniseries, Brand New Cherry Flavor. The series premiered on Friday August 13, 2021.

Antosca served as showrunner, writer, and executive producer on A Friend of the Family for Peacock. and Cape Fear on Apple TV.

== Filmography ==
=== Television ===
Year	Title	Director	Producer	Writer	Notes
2012	Teen Wolf	No	No	Yes	staff writer with Ned Vizzini
2012	Last Resort	No	No	Yes	story editor with Ned Vizzini
2014	Believe	No	No	Yes	story editor with Ned Vizzini
2015	The Player	No	Yes	Yes	Co-producer
2015	Hannibal	No	Yes	Yes	Co-producer, season 3, co-wrote three episodes
2016–2018	Channel Zero	No	Executive	Yes	Creator, showrunner
2019	The Act	No	Executive	Yes	Co-creator, showrunner
2021	Into the Dark	No	No	Story	Episode: "Tentacles"
2021	Brand New Cherry Flavor	Yes	Executive	Yes	Co-creator, showrunner, directed one episode
2021–2024	Chucky	No	Executive	No	
2022	Candy	No	Executive	Yes	Co-creator
2022	A Friend of the Family	No	Executive	Yes	Creator, showrunner
2025	Murdaugh: Death in the Family	No	Executive	No	
2026	Cape Fear	No	Executive	Yes	Creator, showrunner

=== Film ===
Year	Title	Writer	Producer	Notes
2012	The Cottage	Yes	Executive	
2016	The Forest	Yes	No	
2021	Antlers	Yes	Executive	
2026	River	No	Yes	
2026	Verity	Yes	Yes	

== Bibliography ==
- Fires, novel (Impetus Press, 2006; re-released in 2011 by Civil Coping Mechanisms).
- Midnight Picnic, novella (Word Riot Press, 2009).
- The Obese, novella (Lazy Fascist Press, 2012).
- The Hangman's Ritual, novella (Civil Coping Mechanisms, 2013).
- The Girlfriend Game, short story collection (Word Riot Press, 2013).
- The Quiet Boy, short story (Guernica, 2019).
- The Noble Rot, novelette (McSweeney's 71, 2023).

== Awards ==
- 2009 Shirley Jackson Award for Best Novella: Midnight Picnic
