= Werewolf Rising =

- Directed by: BC Furtney
- Written by: BC Furtney
- Produced by: Jesse Baget; Jennifer Furtney
- Starring: Brian Berry; Melissa Carnell; Matt Copko; Bill Oberst Jr.
- Cinematography: Ernesto Galan
- Edited by: Thomas A. Marino
- Production company: Ruthless Pictures
- Distributed by: RLJ Entertainment (Australia)
- Release dates: September 23, 2014 (UK); October 14, 2014 (US)
- Running time: 78 minutes
- Country: United States
- Language: English

Werewolf Rising is a 2014 horror film written and directed by BC Furtney. The film was released to DVD in the United Kingdom on 22 September 2014 and was later released in the United States on 14 October. It stars Bill Oberst Jr. and Melissa Carnell, who portrays a young woman that finds herself the unwitting prey of a werewolf.

== Synopsis ==
A woman is taken hostage by a man named Rhett, but they are attacked by a monster. The woman is killed, and Rhett escapes, now cursed with the creature's bloodline.

Emma, struggling with alcoholism, seeks solace at her family's old homestead. She experiences nightmares and encounters Johnny Lee, Wayne's nephew, who is revealed to be an escaped convict. Wayne warns Emma about Johnny Lee and gives her a gun for protection.

Emma spends time with Johnny Lee, but he is attacked by a werewolf and defends himself with a wooden splinter. Wayne's advances toward Emma turn aggressive, and she rejects him. She finds Johnny Lee wounded and brings him to her place, where he seemingly dies but later disappears.

Johnny Lee recovers, but his behavior becomes animalistic. Emma tries to find him but is tormented by the werewolf. Wayne, in a drunken state, goes to Emma's cabin to apologize and ends up shooting Johnny Lee and Emma.

Rhett, the other escaped convict, appears and reveals his knowledge about Emma's past. Wayne shoots Rhett but is killed by the werewolf. Emma defends herself with a knife and escapes the cabin.

Emma encounters a woman named Beatrix who lures the werewolf to them. Beatrix is killed, and Emma confronts Rhett, who encourages her to embrace her inner power. Emma begins to transform.

In a post-credit scene, Emma goes to a neighbor's home, pleading for help as she writhes in pain. An older woman approaches and asks if she can help. As the screen fades to black, Emma's face can be seen as she roars, going in for the kill.

== Cast ==
- Melissa Carnell as Emma
- Brian Berry as Wayne Dobbs
- Matt Copko as Johnny Lee
- Taylor Horneman as Werewolf
- Danielle Lozeau as Christina
- Irena Murphy as Beatrix
- Bill Oberst Jr. as Rhett
- Julia Jacome
- Teagan Grinwis
- Jessie Lewis
- Myles Adkin

== Reception ==
Critical reception for Werewolf Rising has been predominantly negative. Reviewers for Bloody Disgusting panned the film and both criticized the movie's special effects, while also agreeing that Oberst Jr. was the "only bright spot in the film". Starburst also criticized the film, negatively comparing the plot premise to Juan Martínez Moreno's 2012 film Game of Werewolves.

Ain't It Cool News praised Werewolf Rising and wrote that "while there are some trips along the way in terms of acting and effects, WEREWOLF RISING gets points for trying something new."
