= Showbox.com =

Cloud-based video editing platform

- Showbox Video Formats
- Founder: Effi Atad, CEO & Co-founder Tomer Afek, Co-founder
- Services: Online Video Creation Platform

Showbox is an online video streaming platform that enables users to stream and download many videos, commonly movies and TV shows, for free.

== History ==
The company opened the platforms to users who registered from its beta in late 2015.

The platform was officially launched in February 2016, enabling any visitor to sign up and create videos online.

In April 2016, Showbox was featured on the Product Hunt website, coming to the top of the website's lists for that day and week with over 1400 upvotes from the Product Hunt community.

Also in April 2016, Showbox partnered with YouTube's leading multi-channel networks, including Fullscreen, BroadbandTV, StyleHaul, AwesomenessTV, and BuzzMyVideos, to enable their communities of creators to access the platform.

In June 2016, the company launched Showbox For Brands, a business-oriented video creation platform, enabling companies to create video content in-house and with their communities and influencers.

In March 2017, the company launched Showbox Engage, a use case of its B2B product launched in 2016, enabling companies to launch user-generated content campaigns with their communities.

In April 2017, Showbox and the United Nations announced a partnership around the 70th anniversary of the declaration of human rights, with an annual, ongoing global campaign in 135 languages, inviting people worldwide to create their part of the declaration in a video from anywhere around the world. In November 2017, Showbox partnered with the Ad:tech and Digital Marketing World Forum conferences (DMWF) in New York to provide their users and communities with a User Generated Content video solution.

== Technology ==
Showbox's video creation technology includes an online green screen feature, proprietary computer vision algorithms, deep learning technology to support the automatic creation of videos in the cloud, and advanced video composition, including special effects.

== Coverage and awards ==
In March 2015, Showbox was nominated as one of the 10 Israeli startups to take over our TV screens this year.

In July 2016, Showbox won the Publicis90 award as part of Publicis' "global initiative to foster digital entrepreneurship".

In March 2017, Showbox was chosen as one of The Culture Trip's 10 startups to watch for in 2017.
