= 22nd Indiana Infantry Regiment =

22nd Regiment Indiana Volunteer Infantry
- Flag of the United States, 1863-1865
- Active: August 15, 1861, to July 24, 1865
- Country: United States
- Allegiance: Union
- Branch: Infantry
- Engagements: Battle of Pea Ridge; Battle of Perryville; Battle of Stones River; Battle of Chickamauga; Siege of Chattanooga; Battle of Resaca; Battle of Kennesaw Mountain; Battle of Peachtree Creek; Battle of Jonesboro; Battle of Bentonville

Commanders
- Notable commanders: Colonel Jefferson Columbus Davis; Colonel Michael Gooding; Lieutenant Colonel Squire Keith; Colonel Thomas Shea

The 22nd Indiana Volunteer Infantry Regiment was an infantry regiment that served in the Union Army during the American Civil War. On October 8, 1862, at the Battle of Perryville, Kentucky, the regiment suffered 65.3% casualties, one of the highest percentages of casualties suffered by any American Civil War regiment in a single engagement.

== Service ==
Attached to Army of the West and Department of Missouri September 1861 to January 1862. 1st Brigade, 3rd Division, Army of Southwest Missouri, to May 1862. 1st Brigade, 4th Division, Army of the Mississippi, to September 1862. 30th Brigade, 9th Division, Army of the Ohio, September 1862. 30th Brigade, 9th Division, III Corps, Army of the Ohio, to November 1862. 1st Brigade, 1st Division, Right Wing, XIV Corps, Army of the Cumberland, to January 1863. 1st Brigade, 1st Division, XX Corps, Army of the Cumberland, to October 1863. 2nd Brigade, 1st Division, IV Corps, Army of the Cumberland, October 1863. 1st Brigade, 2nd Division, IV Corps, to April 1864. 3rd Brigade, 2nd Division, XIV Corps, to July 1865.

== Detailed Service ==
The 22nd Indiana Volunteer Infantry was organized at Madison, Indiana, and mustered in at Indianapolis, Indiana, on August 15, 1861. Moved to St. Louis, Missouri, August 17. March to relief of Colonel Mulligan at Lexington, Missouri, September. Action at Glasgow, Missouri, September 19. Fremont's advance on Springfield, Missouri, September 22-October 15. Pope's Expedition to Milford, Missouri, December 15–19, 1861. Action at Milford (or Shawnee) Mound on Blackwater Creek and capture of 1,300 prisoners on December 18. Duty at Otterville, Missouri, in January, 1862. Advanace on Springfield, Missouri, January 24-February 14. Pursuit of Sterling Price to Cassville, Arkansas. Battle of Pea Ridge, Arkansas, March 6–8. March to Batesville, Arkansas, April 5-May 3. Moved to Cape Girardeau, Missouri, thence to Corinth, Mississippi, May 20–28. Siege of Corinth, Mississippi, May 28–30. Pursuit to Booneville May 31-June 6. Duty at Jacinto and other points in Northern Mississippi till August 17. March to Louisville, Kentucky, August 17-September 26. Pursuit of Braxton Bragg into Kentucky October 1–15. Battle of Perryville, Kentucky, October 8. Lancaster October 14. March to Nashville, Tennessee, October 16-November 28. Scout to Harpeth Shoals November 26–30. At Nashville till December 26. Wilson's Creek Pike December 25. Advance on Murfreesboro December 26–30. Nolensville December 26–27. Battle of Stones River December 30–31, 1862, and January 1–3, 1863. Duty at Murfreesboro till June. Operations on Edgeville Pike near Munfreesboro, June 4. Middle Tennessee (or Tullahoma) Campaign June 23-July 7. Liberty Gap June 24–27. Occupation of Middle Tennessee till August 16. Passage of the Cumberland Mountains and Tennessee River and Chickamauga, Georgia, Campaign August 16-September 22. Guard supply trains over Mountains in rear of Bragg's army during Battle of Chickamauga. Siege of Chattanooga, Tennessee, September 22-November 23. Before Chattanooga September 22–26. Chattanooga-Ringgold Campaign November 23–27. Orchard Knob November 23–24. Battle of Missionary Ridge November 25. Pursuit to Graysville November 26–27. March to relief of Knoxville, Tennessee, November 28-December 8. Re-enlisted at Blain's Cross Roads December 23, 1863. Operations in East Tennessee till February, 1864. Veterans on Furlough February and March. Atlanta campaign, Georgia May 1-September 8. Tunnel Hill May 6–7. Demonstration on Rocky Face Ridge May 8–11. Buzzard's Roost Gap May 8–9. Battle of Resaca May 14–15. Rome May 17–18. Advance on Dallas May 18–25. Operations on line of Pumpkin Vine Creek and battles about Dallas, New Hope Church and Allatoona Hills May 25-June 5. Operations about Marietta and against Kennesaw Mountain June 10-July 2. Pine Hill June 11–14. Lost Mountain June 15–17. Assault during the Battle of Kennesaw Mountain June 27. Ruff's Station July 4. Chattahoochie River July 5–17. Battle of Peachtree Creek July 19–20. Siege of Atlanta July 22-August 25. Utoy Creek August 5–7. Flank movement on Jonesboro August 25–30. Battle of Jonesboro August 31-September 1. Operations against Hood in North Georgia and North Alabama September 29-November 3. Sherman's march to the sea November 15-December 10. Louisville November 30. Siege of Savannah, Georgia December 10–21. Carolina Campaign January to April, 1865. Taylor's Hole Creek, Battle of Averasborough, North Carolina, March 16. Battle of Bentonville March 19–21. Occupation of Goldsboro March 24. Advance on Raleigh April 10–14. Occupation of Raleigh April 14. Bennett's House April 26. Surrender of Johnston and his army. March to Washington, D. C., via Richmond, Virginia, April 29-May 19. Grand Review of the Armies May 24. Moved to Louisville, Kentucky, June and duty there till July. The regiment mustered out of service on July 24, 1865.

== Total strength and casualties ==
The regiment lost 14 officers and 139 enlisted men killed in action or died of wounds and 190 enlisted men who died of disease, for a total of 343 fatalities.

== Commanders ==
- Colonel Jefferson Columbus Davis - promoted to brigadier general
- Colonel Michael Gooding - promoted to brigade command, captured at Perryville
- Lieutenant Colonel Squire Isham Keith - commanded regiment and killed at Perryville
- Colonel Thomas Shea

== See also ==
- List of Indiana Civil War regiments
- Indiana in the Civil War
