= George K. Brady =

American politician

George Keyports Brady
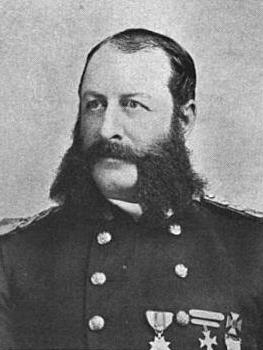

2nd Commander of the Department of Alaska
- In office September 1, 1870 – September 22, 1870
- President: Ulysses S. Grant
- Preceded by: Jefferson C. Davis
- Succeeded by: John C. Tidball

Personal details
- Born: George Keyports Brady; December 9, 1838 Chambersburg, Pennsylvania
- Died: January 20, 1899 (aged 60) Chicago, Illinois
- Relations: Jasper Ewing Brady (father) Samuel Brady (great-uncle); Hugh Brady (great-uncle) Cyrus Townsend Brady (nephew)

Military service
- Allegiance: United States of America
- Branch/service: United States Army; Union Army
- Years of service: 1861–94
- Rank: Lieutenant Colonel
- Unit: 23rd U.S. Infantry
- Battles/wars: American Civil War; Battle of Gaines' Mill; Battle of Malvern Hill; Second Battle of Bull Run; Battle of Chancellorsville; Battle of Gettysburg; Battle of the Wilderness; Battle of Laurel Hill; Siege of Petersburg; Battle of Weldon Railroad; American Indian Wars; Apache Wars; Snake War

George Keyports Brady (December 9, 1838 – January 20, 1899) was an officer in the United States Army who served as the second commander of the Department of Alaska, from September 1, 1870, to September 22, 1870.

== Early life ==
Brady was born in Chambersburg, Pennsylvania, on December 9, 1838. He was the son of Jasper Ewing Brady, a lawyer who later served as a Whig member of the U.S. House of Representatives from Pennsylvania, and whose uncles included noted Indian fighters Samuel Brady and Hugh Brady.

== Civil War ==
At the outbreak of the Civil War, Brady enlisted as a private in the 12th Pennsylvania Infantry. On July 8, 1861, he accepted a commission as a first lieutenant in the Regular Army's 14th Infantry Regiment. He served in this regiment throughout the war, participating in the battles of Gaines' Mill, Malvern Hill, Second Bull Run, Chacellorsville, Gettysburg, the Wilderness, Laurel Hill, Petersburg, and Weldon Railroad. In the latter battle, he was taken prisoner and held at Libby Prison before being paroled in September 1864. Brady received a promotion to captain on June 10, 1864, and received a brevet as major for his gallantry at Weldon Railroad on August 18, 1864. On March 16, 1865, he was brevetted a lieutenant colonel for his meritorious services during the war.

== Later career ==
Immediately after the conclusion of the war, the 14th Infantry was sent to the west coast, where Brady was posted at Camp McDowell, Arizona, accompanied by his wife Henrietta Margaret and their baby daughter. The baby died in March 1866. In September 1866, he was transferred to the 23rd Infantry and was posted to Camp Three Forks Owyhee, Idaho, where he took part in the Snake War. His son, Mifflin Brodhead Brady, was born in Idaho in July 1868.

From July 1869 to May 1871, Brady's company was posted at Sitka, Alaska, and Brady served briefly as commander of the Department of Alaska. He later served at various posts across the West, including Camp Lowell, Fort Leavenworth, Fort Supply, Fort Union, and Fort Mackinac.

He was promoted to major in the 18th Infantry in March 1886, and was stationed in Denver until May 1889 when he took command of Fort Hays. He was promoted to lieutenant colonel in the 17th Infantry in March 1891 and commanded that regiment at Fort D. A. Russell. Brady retired at his own request on August 16, 1894, and died in Chicago on January 20, 1899.

== See also ==
- Governors of Alaska
- James H. Brady, a third cousin, was Governor of Idaho, 1909–1911.
- Jerry Brady, James H. Brady's great-grandson.

Military offices
Preceded by Jefferson C. Davis	Commanders of the Department of Alaska; September 1 – 22, 1870	Succeeded by John C. Tidball
