= Battle of Dry Lake =

Coordinates: 41.7°N 121.3°W

- Part of Modoc War (Indian Wars)
Date	May 10, 1873
Location	Lava Beds, California
Result	United States victory

Belligerents
Modoc	United States

Commanders and leaders
Captain Jack, Scarface Charley	Jefferson C. Davis

Strength
?	?

Casualties and losses
5 warriors killed	5 killed; 8 wounded

The Battle of Dry Lake, also known as Sorass Lake, was the first decisive victory of the United States over the Modoc Indians in northern California in 1873. The battle led to the splintering of the Modoc bands, and was the last major battle of the Modoc War.

== Background ==
On May 2, 1873, Colonel Jefferson C. Davis became the new commander of the Department of the Columbia. Davis assumed field command of the army and ordered an expedition to trap Captain Jack who was moving southeast from the Lava Beds. The U.S. cavalry arrived and camped near the affectionately named, Sore Ass Lake. However, when they found that there was no water in the lake, they renamed it to Dry Lake.

== The battle ==
At dawn on May 10, a small detachment of Modoc warriors attacked the U.S. camp while the rest took up a position in the bluffs above the lake. The startled troopers quickly rolled out of their blankets and took cover behind any obstacle they could find, no matter how small, in order to fasten their gunbelts and pull on their boots. The officers restored order and the mounted Warm Springs Indian scouts were sent around the Modoc flanks while the rest of the U.S. force was ordered to charge the bluffs. The troopers paused at the bottom of the bluff, leery to charge the strong position on top of the bluff. 1st Sgt. Thomas Kelley shouted "God damn it, lets charge". For the first time in the Modoc War, U.S. troops charged and routed the warriors defending the bluff. The warriors fled so quickly that the Warm Springs had not even made it around the flanks, and one prominent warrior, Ellen's Man George, was left dead on the field. The troopers pursued the Modocs for 4 miles but exhausted and lacking water, they stopped.

== Aftermath ==
The Battle of Dry Lake signaled the beginning of the end of the Modoc War. Davis reported after the battle that he was pleased with the conduct of his troopers and that they had not fled when the Modocs first attacked. An editorial in the Army and Navy Journal said Davis' presence in the field improved the formerly mismanaged field operations. The rout of Captain Jack and the death of Ellen's Man took a serious toll on the Modocs. A division grew between several of the leaders. Hooker Jim, Bogus Charley and Scarface Charley held Captain Jack responsible for Ellen's Man's death. They split and headed west. Captain Jack and Schonchin John stayed at Big Sandy Butte. Later that month, Bogus Charley and Hooker Jim surrendered to Col. Davis and pledged their help to Davis in capturing Captain Jack. Finally, in June 1873, Captain Jack surrendered.
