= Rick King (director) =

American screenwriter

- Born: United States
- Occupations: Screenwriter, director

Rick King is an American director and screenwriter notable for co-writing the story to the 1991 film Point Break and its 2015 remake.

== Filmography ==
=== As director ===
- Off the Wall (1977)
- Hard Choices (1985)
- Hotshot (1986)
- The Killing Time (1987)
- Forced March (1989)
- Prayer of the Rollerboys (1990)
- Kickboxer 3: The Art of War (1992)
- Quick (1993)
- A Passion to Kill (1994)
- Terminal Justice (1996)
- Catherine's Grove (1997)
- Road Ends (1997)
- Voices in Wartime (2005)
- Sherman's March (2007)
- Maya Underworld: The Real Doomsday (2012)

=== As writer ===
- Point Break (1991)
- Point Break (2015)
