= Antlers (2021 film) =

Supernatural horror film

- Theatrical release poster
- Directed by: Scott Cooper
- Screenplay by: C. Henry Chaisson; Nick Antosca; Scott Cooper
- Based on: "The Quiet Boy" by Nick Antosca
- Produced by: Guillermo del Toro; David S. Goyer; J. Miles Dale
- Starring: Keri Russell; Jesse Plemons; Jeremy T. Thomas; Graham Greene; Scott Haze; Rory Cochrane; Amy Madigan
- Cinematography: Florian Hoffmeister
- Edited by: Dylan Tichenor
- Music by: Javier Navarrete
- Production companies: Searchlight Pictures; Phantom Four Films; Double Dare You; Mirada Studio; Demilo Films
- Distributed by: Searchlight Pictures
- Release dates: October 11, 2021 (Beyond Fest); October 29, 2021 (United States)
- Running time: 99 minutes
- Countries: United States; Mexico; Canada
- Language: English
- Box office: $18.9 million

Antlers is a 2021 supernatural horror film directed and co-written by Scott Cooper, and starring Keri Russell, Jesse Plemons, Jeremy T. Thomas, Graham Greene, Scott Haze, Rory Cochrane, and Amy Madigan. The screenplay was adapted from Nick Antosca's short story "The Quiet Boy". The film follows a school teacher who suspects one of her students is suffering from personal problems in his home life, not knowing that he is harboring an evil demon in his house.

The project was announced in July 2018 with Cooper attached to direct, and the cast joining the next month. Filming took place in British Columbia in October and November 2018.

Antlers premiered at Beyond Fest on October 11, 2021, and was theatrically released in the United States on October 29, 2021, by Searchlight Pictures, after being delayed twice from an April 2020 release date due to the COVID-19 pandemic. The film received mixed reviews from critics, who praised the cinematography, acting and the horror elements, but criticized the screenplay.

== Plot ==
In the small town of Cispus Falls in central Oregon, Frank Weaver runs a meth lab out of an inactive mine. While his seven-year-old son Aiden waits outside in his truck, Frank and an accomplice are attacked by an unseen creature.

Three weeks later, twelve-year-old Lucas Weaver, Aiden's older brother, spends time roaming the town, bringing home roadkill and small animals he kills. Lucas's teacher, Julia Meadows, alarmed by his behavior and frightening drawings, attempts to bond with the troubled boy. Spurred by her own experience of childhood abuse at the hands of her mentally ill alcoholic father, she suspects that Lucas is abused and becomes determined to help him. Since her father's suicide, she returned to Cispus Falls to be with her brother Paul, who is the local sheriff, and whom she feels guilty about abandoning when she was younger. Julia visits Lucas's rundown home and hears strange sounds.

A flashback shows Frank and Aiden returning home after the attack. Frank locked the two of them in the attic and demanded Lucas keep them locked no matter what. The animal carcasses Lucas collected are used to feed his ravenously feral father and younger brother.

Former sheriff Warren Stokes finds half of Frank's accomplice's corpse in the woods. Paul and Warren later discover the other half in the mine along with part of an antler. Meanwhile, Julia pressures the school principal Ellen into paying Frank a visit. Inside the Weaver house, Ellen discovers the room containing Frank and Aiden. After she unlocks and enters it, Frank kills her and antlers burst out of his body. Frank, now transformed into a savage antlered creature, kills Lucas's school bully Clint Owens when he harasses Lucas.

Ellen is reported missing and Julia visits the Weaver house, where she finds Ellen's car. The police arrive and discover Ellen's body along a charred corpse, presumably Frank's. Aiden is nowhere to be found. When Lucas returns home, he is taken to the hospital, where Julia and Paul are told he is severely malnourished, dehydrated, and shows physical signs of having been abused for some time. Julia lets Lucas stay with her.

The next day, while Lucas recovers in the hospital, Julia and Paul pay Warren a visit and show him Lucas's drawings. Warren identifies the figure as the wendigo, a legendary Algonquin demon that appears as a ravenous deer-like monster that passes from person to person. It can only be killed when it is weakest: as it is feeding and to extinguish its beating heart. Clint's body is discovered that night. After Lucas is discharged, he tells Julia that Frank is coming for him to take him to the mine and reunite with Aiden.

The transformed Frank uses Aiden to lure Paul's deputy sheriff Dan out and kill him. Julia and Lucas hide while Paul is badly wounded. Lucas escapes to the mine and Julia and Paul follow, armed with a pistol. Inside, Julia discovers Lucas and Aiden, and sees that Frank has indeed become a demon, currently feasting on a dead black bear. After a fight, she kills the wendigo-possessed Frank with Lucas's help. The wendigo spirit passes into Aiden and Julia stabs Aiden to death, seemingly ending the curse.

Sometime later, Paul and Julia discuss keeping Lucas with them for a while despite concerns he may become possessed as well. As Julia and Lucas leave, Paul begins to cough up a black bile, as Frank did when he was first possessed by the demon.

== Cast ==
- Keri Russell as Julia Meadows
- Jesse Plemons as Paul Meadows
- Jeremy T. Thomas as Lucas Weaver
- Graham Greene as Warren Stokes
- Scott Haze as Frank Weaver
- Rory Cochrane as Daniel LeCroy
- Amy Madigan as Ellen Booth

In addition, Sawyer Jones portrays Aiden Weaver and Dorian Kingi portrays the wendigo.

== Production ==
In July 2018, it was announced that Guillermo del Toro would produce Antlers. The screenplay was adapted from Nick Antosca's short story "The Quiet Boy", which was not published until January 2019, in Guernica magazine.

The initial announcement included Scott Cooper as director, with Keri Russell in negotiations to star, and filming set to begin in Vancouver, British Columbia, by the fourth quarter of 2018. In August 2018, Jesse Plemons joined the cast. In October 2018, Jeremy T. Thomas, Graham Greene, Amy Madigan, Scott Haze and Rory Cochrane joined the cast.

In August 2018, it was confirmed that principal photography would begin on October 1, 2018, and finish on November 30, 2018. Exterior scenes were filmed in November 2018 in the town of Hope, British Columbia, 100 kilometers (62 mi) inland of the Greater Vancouver region, standing in for the Oregon town of the film, with other scenes filmed in Greater Vancouver's Port Moody, Langley, Squamish and Alouette Lake.

== Release ==
The Canada–U.S.–Mexico co-production premiered at Beyond Fest in Los Angeles on October 11, 2021. It was theatrically released in the United States on October 29, 2021.

The film was originally scheduled to be released on April 17, 2020, but was removed from the release calendar due to the COVID-19 pandemic. It was rescheduled to February 19, 2021, before being removed from the release calendar again.

Antlers was released on digital download on December 21, 2021. This was followed by a Blu-ray and DVD release on January 4, 2022, by Walt Disney Studios Home Entertainment.

== Reception ==
=== Box office ===
Antlers grossed $10.6 million in the United States and Canada, and $8.2 million in other territories, for a worldwide total of $18.9 million.

In the United States and Canada, Antlers was released in 2,800 theaters for its opening weekend, alongside the wide release of Last Night in Soho and wide expansion of The French Dispatch. It debuted with a domestic weekend total of $4.3 million, finishing sixth at the box office. In its second weekend, the film dropped 54% to $2 million; it remained in the top ten for its first three weeks.

=== Critical response ===
On the review aggregator website Rotten Tomatoes, 59% of 179 critics' reviews are positive. The website's critics consensus reads: "It struggles to find a successful balance between its genre and allegorical elements, but Antlers is sharp enough to recommend as a richly atmospheric creature feature." On Metacritic, the film has a weighted average score of 57 out of 100 based on 33 critical reviews, indicating "mixed or average" reviews. Audiences polled by CinemaScore gave the film an average grade of C+ on an A+ to F scale, while those at PostTrak gave it a 59% positive score, with 42% saying they would definitely recommend it.

Todd Gilchrist of TheWrap gave the film a mostly positive review, calling it "a handsome, meticulous, yet overly serious entry in a horror sub-genre explored too infrequently; Guillermo del Toro was right to choose Cooper, but what the film needs is more of del Toro's own exuberance to truly bring it to life." Linda Marric of The Jewish Chronicle gave the film a score of 3/5 stars, writing: "Antlers is both dark in tone and aesthetically stunning to look at. Cooper does a fantastic job in creating a suitably dark and disturbing atmosphere to go with the film's decidedly dark body horror narrative", but added that it "eventually leans a little too heavily on jarringly obvious allegories about drug addiction and child abuse, losing all the things it had built on in the process". Jake Wilson of The Age gave the film 3/5 stars, describing it as "murky but interesting" and writing that it "is a lot less goofy than you'd expect from a horror movie called Antlers, certainly less goofy than it would have been if its producer Guillermo del Toro had directed it himself". John DeFore of The Hollywood Reporter wrote that the film was "thoroughly successful both as icky art house horror and as an allegory of generational trauma" and praised Jeremy T. Thomas's performance. Brian Lowry of CNN wrote: "The net effect isn't necessarily bad assuming that expectations are modest, and there's something to be said for a more understated, small-scale approach to horror that doesn't confuse body count with scares."

Eric Eisenberg of CinemaBlend gave the film a 2.5/5-star rating, saying in a mixed review: "Given its promise and everything it does right, Antlers winds up being a frustrating experience." Meagan Navarro, writing for Bloody Disgusting, also gave the film 2.5/5 stars and said that Cooper takes it too seriously, putting the emotional trauma at the forefront and saving the horror for the finale. She labelled the film a "monologue". Kevin Maher of The Times gave the film 2/5 stars, writing: "A sterling performance from Keri Russell is wasted on this po-faced yet inherently silly horror film about a mutant killer humanoid stag monster." Benjamin Lee of The Guardian also gave the film 2/5 stars, writing: "There's probably a semi-decent creature feature here and maybe, with a hefty amount of redrafting, a semi-decent human drama but as it stands it fails at both, a satisfying, coherent film buried underneath copious amounts of animal guts." Clarisse Loughrey of The Independent gave the film 2/5 stars, writing: "There are measured performances here by both Russell and Plemons, two unfailingly talented actors, and a host of well-crafted practical effects... But all the trickery in the world can't conceal how inauthentic Antlers feels at heart." Barry Hertz of The Globe and Mail wrote: "Antlers is a gross film... But the film's eeeeeghghgh quality isn't limited to its on-screen viscera—Antler's gross-ness extends to its screenplay's slop-bucket collection of overused but underdeveloped themes, and a visual style that cough-gurgles poverty-porn fetishism." Anna Bogutskaya said on BBC Radio 5 Live: "It's really egregious, I think, how it just pulls out First Nations mythologies, like the mythology of the Wendigo, and the only First Nations actor that they cast in the film, Graham Greene, basically just delivers a bunch of spooky exposition and then disappears."
