= Brand New Cherry Flavor =

American horror drama streaming television series

- Promotional release poster
- Genre: Horror; Drama
- Created by: Nick Antosca; Lenore Zion
- Based on: Brand New Cherry Flavor by Todd Grimson
- Starring: Rosa Salazar; Catherine Keener; Eric Lange; Manny Jacinto; Jeff Ward
- Composer: Jeff Russo
- Country of origin: United States
- Original language: English
- No. of episodes: 8

Production
- Executive producers: Nick Antosca; Lenore Zion
- Camera setup: Single-camera
- Running time: 36–52 minutes
- Production companies: Eat the Cat; Universal Content Productions

Original release
- Network: Netflix
- Release: August 13, 2021

Brand New Cherry Flavor is an American horror drama television miniseries created by Nick Antosca and Lenore Zion, based on the novel of the same name by Todd Grimson. The cast includes Rosa Salazar, Catherine Keener, Eric Lange, Manny Jacinto, and Jeff Ward. The series premiered on Netflix on August 14, 2021.

Lisa, a young filmmaker, arrives in 1990s Hollywood to meet a well-connected film producer who has been impressed by her short horror film. Lisa signs a contract with the producer based on his promise that she can direct, but after rebuffing his sexual advances she is dropped from the film. Feeling powerless, she makes a deal with a witch to help her on a quest for revenge.

== Cast and characters ==
=== Main ===
- Rosa Salazar as Lisa Nova
- Catherine Keener as Boro/Jennifer Nathans
- Eric Lange as Lou Burke
- Jeff Ward as Roy Hardaway

=== Recurring ===
- Manny Jacinto as Chris/Code
- Hannah Levien as Christine Woods
- Siena Werber as Mary Gray/Boro
- Daniel Doheny as Jonathan Burke
- Darcy Laurie as Ralph
- Sean Owen Roberts as James

=== Guest stars ===
- Leland Orser as Mike Nathans
- Patrick Fischler as Alvin Sender
- Gabriel LaBelle as Tim Nathans

== Episodes ==
No.	Title	Directed by	Written by	Original release date
1	"I Exist"	Arkasha Stevenson	Teleplay by : Lenore Zion & Nick Antosca	August 13, 2021
2	"Hair of the Dog"	Gandja Monteiro	Mando Alvarado	August 13, 2021
3	"Roman Candle"	Gandja Monteiro	Christina Ham	August 13, 2021
4	"Tadpole Smoothie"	Matt Sobel	Teleplay by : Nick Antosca & Haley Z. Boston; Story by : Alana B. Lytle & Haley Z. Boston	August 13, 2021
5	"Jennifer"	Matt Sobel	Lenore Zion & Haley Z. Boston	August 13, 2021
6	"Milk Bath"	Jake Schreier	Matt Fennell	August 13, 2021
7	"Egg"	Jake Schreier	Mando Alvarado & Christina Ham; Lenore Zion & Nick Antosca	August 13, 2021
8	"Bodies"	Nick Antosca	Lenore Zion & Nick Antosca	August 13, 2021

== Production ==
On November 15, 2019, it was announced that Netflix had given the production a series order for an 8-episode series. The miniseries was created, written and executive produced by Nick Antosca and Lenore Zion. Arkasha Stevenson directed the first episode. Production companies involved with the series consists of Eat the Cat and Universal Content Productions. Alongside the series order announcement, it was confirmed that Rosa Salazar, Catherine Keener, Eric Lange, Manny Jacinto, and Jeff Ward had joined the cast. On December 17, 2020, Hannah Levien, Leland Orser, and Patrick Fischler were announced as recurring cast members. Principal photography took place on location in Vancouver and Los Angeles from November 2019 to March 2020. The series was released on August 13, 2021.

== Reception ==
Rotten Tomatoes collected 37 reviews and identified 78 percent of them as positive, with an average rating of 6.9/10. The critics consensus states, "Though definitely not for all tastes, Brand New Cherry Flavor is a delightfully deranged trip anchored by another incredible performance from Rosa Salazar." According to Metacritic, the series received "generally favorable reviews" based on a weighted average score of 62 out of 100 from 13 reviews.
