= The Killing Time (film) =

- Directed by: Rick King
- Written by: Don Bohlinger; James Nathan; Bruce Franklin Singer
- Produced by: Peter Abrams; J.P. Guerin; Robert L. Levy
- Starring: Beau Bridges; Kiefer Sutherland; Joe Don Baker; Camelia Kath; Wayne Rogers; Michael Madsen; Janet Carroll
- Cinematography: Paul Goldsmith
- Edited by: Lorenzo DeStefano
- Music by: Paul Chihara
- Distributed by: New World Pictures; Columbia TriStar Home Video
- Release date: October 23, 1987
- Running time: 94 minutes
- Country: United States
- Language: English
- Box office: $500,283 (US)

The Killing Time is a 1987 American thriller film directed by Rick King, starring Beau Bridges and Kiefer Sutherland. It was Sutherland's first role as a central character in an American film. It also features Kiefer's first wife, Camelia Kath.

== Plot ==
A stranger shoots a man named Brian Mars and buries him on the side of a road. Then he assumes his identity and moves to a small town in California to start a job as a deputy sheriff. His motives are unclear, but he has nightmares of being a child and finding his father's dead body hanging on a rope.

Meanwhile, Deputy Sam Wayburn is having an affair with Laura Winslow. Her husband is a cruel, powerful, and wealthy man named Jake Winslow. After Laura gets beaten and raped by her husband, she and Sam decide they want him dead. After Sam discovers that "Brian" owns an unregistered gun, they decide to kill Jake with Brian's gun and frame Brian for the murder.

However, as they are planning the murder, Brian is watching them from a distance and is well aware of their plans. The night of the planned murder, Brian sabotages them by disabling Laura's car and informing Jake of what his wife planned. He gives Jake a ride home, but as Jake is thanking him, Brian pulls out a gun on him. He explains that his father's death was Jake's fault and shoots him.

Later, when Jake's body is discovered, Sam is ready to start explaining about Brian's unregistered gun, but the detective explains that Jake was shot with Sam's gun. As Sam is asking Laura why she used his gun, she explains that her car was disabled and she never had a chance to shoot him. Then they figure that Brian must have killed him.

Sam goes to Brian's house to confront him and Brian angrily yells at him for trying to set him up and pulls his gun and chases him through some fields to try to kill him. Meanwhile, Sheriff Carl Cunningham finds an all points bulletin identifying the body of the real Brian Mars buried off the side of the road and he heads over to Brian's house to arrest him. Just as Brian has caught up to Sam and is about to pull the trigger, Carl shoots Brian first.

Even though Sam is cleared of any wrongdoing, he doesn't feel like he was a very good cop and resigns from the force and continues his relationship with Laura.

== Cast ==
- Beau Bridges as Sam Wayburn
- Kiefer Sutherland as The Stranger
- Wayne Rogers as Jake Winslow
- Joe Don Baker as Carl Cunningham
- Camelia Kath as Laura Winslow
- Janet Carroll as Lila Daggett
- Michael Madsen as Stu
- Jeb Ellis-Brown as Brian Mars
- Shiri Appleby as Annie Winslow

== Release ==
The film was released on 23 October 1987 in the United States.

== Reception ==
Janet Maslin in The New York Times wrote that the film "offers little that's new". Michael Wilmington in The Los Angeles Times praised Sutherland's performance but felt he had too little screen time and called the plot "a terrific premise that goes sour fast".
