= Elf Yourself =

American interactive website

- Elf Yourself early logo (pictured during JibJab's authorship)
- Website type: Christmas
- Available in: English
- Owner: Office Depot
- Creators: Evolution Bureau (2006-2007); "Toy. (2006-2007); JibJab (2008-2011); Oddcast (2012-present)
- Editors: JibJab (2009-2011); Oddcast (2011-present)
- Website: Elf Yourself website
- Registration: none
- Launched: December 2006; 19 years ago
- Current status: Holiday season only
- Content license: free for users

Elf Yourself is an American interactive website where visitors upload faces of themselves or their friends and have the option to post the created video to other sites or save it as a personalized mini-film. Globally, over two billion elves have been created since the application was first introduced in 2006. The video and website were created by Evolution Bureau (EVB), in collaboration with New York company "Toy." for Office Max's holiday season advertising campaign.

The Elf Yourself website and advertising campaign first launched for the Christmas holiday season in early December 12, 2006, and has returned each subsequent season. After being contracted by OfficeMax to create multiple websites for their holiday campaign, "Toy." contracted with Evolution Bureau to create a suitable holiday-themed website and application. Evolution Bureau then developed the Elf Yourself application for use with the OfficeMax holiday marketing campaign. The original release featured only one elf, portrayed by Danielle Bárcena, and received 200 hits a second. In later releases, additional elves were added to the application and viewers could upload different images for each elf. Still later, social media applications were added, included those allowing viewers to save and/or download the films they had created through visiting the website. In 2008, OfficeMax partnered with JibJab and added a registration requirement in order to use the site. Traffic dropped to 56 million. JibJab worked to "enhance the performance and distribution of the videos."

In 2009, the campaign being run by JibJab, the registration requirement was dropped, and social elements were added. Also in 2009, to further promote the Elf Yourself website, OfficeMax contracted with Tribal DDB and Grand Central Marketing to create a flash mob of 400 dancers dressed in Elf Yourself costumes.

== Reception ==
Brand Republic reported on the insertion of personal images, stating "while the idea has been widely used in other applications, OfficeMax's version has become an internet phenomenon." Adweek reported "Elf Yourself has hit the bull's-eye of viral success: It has seeped into pop culture. Broadcasters at several local stations, The Today Show and Good Morning America created their own dancing holiday greeting for viewers." In Social Media Judo, it was pointed out that while OfficeMax hoped Elf Yourself would "warm up" its corporate image, "the overwhelming majority of customers who saw Office Max's popular marketing campaign gave credit to the company's top competitors." In addressing the creation of the 20 microsites created for OfficeMax, Adland called Elf Yourself "a strange, corny, yet enormously successful website."

== Awards and nominations ==
- 2007, won Retail Advertising and Marketing Association RACies Award for 'Interactive Online Campaign'
- 2008, won three Ad:Tech Awards: 'Best Word of Mouth Marketing Campaign', 'Best User Defined Experience', and 'Best of Show'.
- 2008, won SXSW Interactive 'Award for Web Amusement'.
- 2008, won Retail Advertising and Marketing Association RACies Award for 'Interactive Online Campaign'
