= A Passion to Kill =

- Directed by: Rick King
- Screenplay by: William Delligan
- Produced by: Bruce Cohn Curtis
- Starring: Scott Bakula; Chelsea Field; Sheila Kelley
- Cinematography: Paul Ryan
- Edited by: David H. Lloyd
- Music by: Robert Sprayberry
- Production company: Rysher Entertainment
- Distributed by: A-Pix Entertainment
- Release date: November 4, 1994 (New York City)
- Running time: 95 minutes
- Country: United States
- Language: English

A Passion to Kill is a 1994 American mystery thriller film directed by Rick King and starring Scott Bakula, Chelsea Field and Sheila Kelley.

== Plot ==
A psychiatrist (Bakula) gets involved with his best friend's wife (Field) who may be a murderer.

== Cast ==
- Scott Bakula as David
- Chelsea Field as Diana
- Sheila Kelley as Beth
- John Getz as Jerry
- Rex Smith as Ted
- France Nuyen as Lou Mazaud
- Eddie Velez as Morales
- Michael Warren as Martindale
