= Jefferson C. Davis =

United States Army general (1828–1879)

Jefferson Columbus Davis
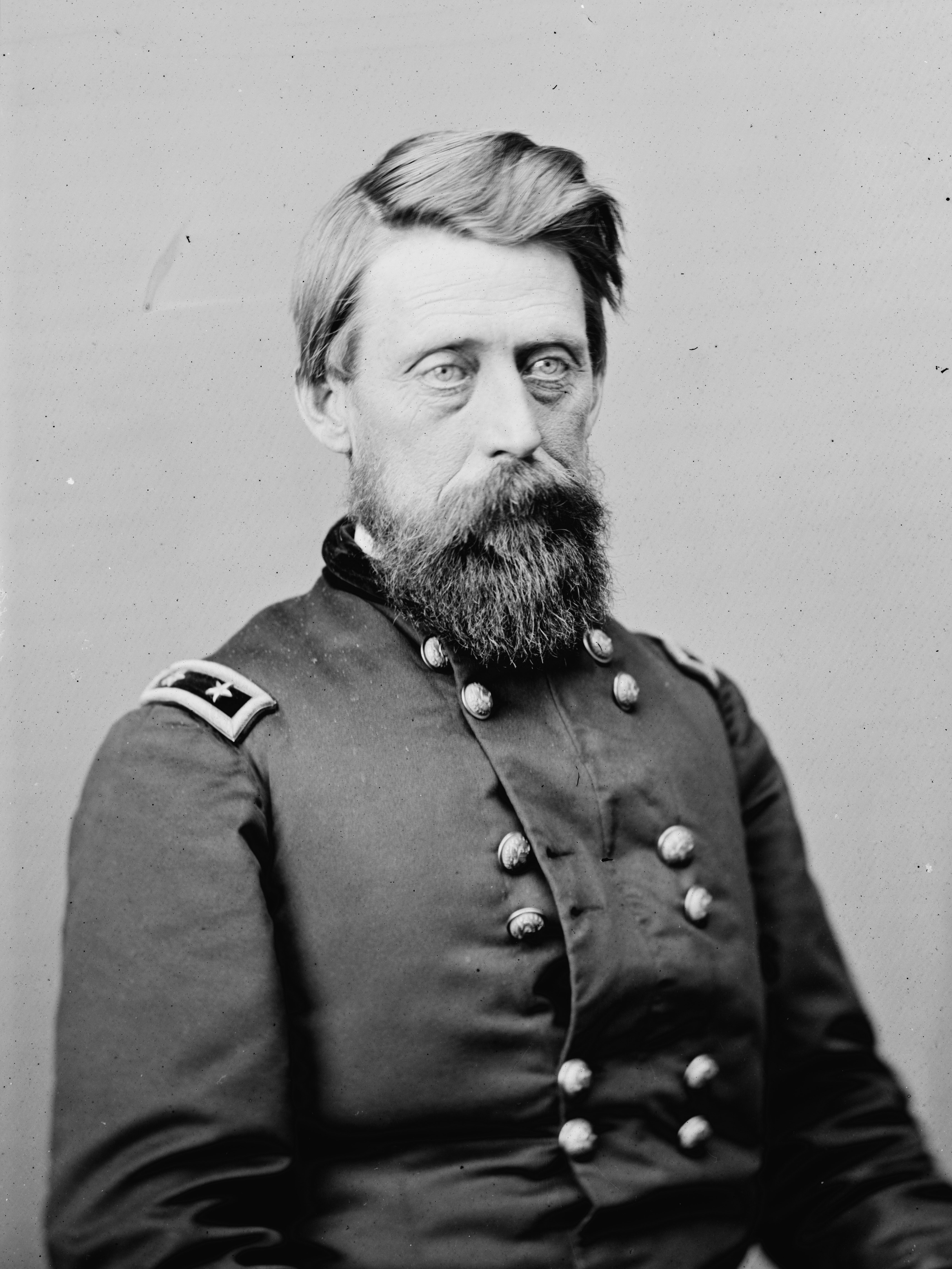

1st Commander of the Department of Alaska
- In office October 18, 1867 – August 31, 1870
- President: Andrew Johnson; Ulysses S. Grant
- Preceded by: Position established
- Succeeded by: George K. Brady

Personal details
- Born: Jefferson Columbus Davis; March 2, 1828 Clark County, Indiana, U.S.
- Died: November 30, 1879 (aged 51) Chicago, Illinois, U.S.
- Resting place: Crown Hill Cemetery and Arboretum, Section 29, Lot 1; 39.8165762°N 86.1723962°W
- Nickname: "JCD"

Military service
- Allegiance: United States
- Branch/service: United States Army; Union Army
- Years of service: 1846–1879
- Rank: Brigadier General; Brevet Major General
- Commands: 22nd Indiana Infantry; XIV Corps; Department of Alaska; Department of the Columbia
- Battles/wars: Mexican–American War; Battle of Buena Vista; American Civil War; Fort Sumter; Pea Ridge; Corinth; Stones River; Chickamauga; Atlanta campaign; March to the Sea; Carolinas campaign; Bentonville; American Indian Wars; Modoc War

Jefferson Columbus Davis (March 2, 1828 – November 30, 1879) was a regular officer of the United States Army during the American Civil War, known for the similarity of his name to that of Confederate President Jefferson Davis and for his killing of a superior officer in 1862.

Davis's distinguished service in Mexico earned him high prestige at the outbreak of the Civil War, when he led Union troops through Southern Missouri to Pea Ridge, Arkansas, being promoted to Brigadier General after that significant victory. Following the Siege of Corinth, he was granted home leave on account of exhaustion, but returned to duty on hearing of Union defeats in Kentucky, where he reported to General William "Bull" Nelson at Louisville in September 1862. Nelson was dissatisfied with his performance, and insulted him in front of witnesses. A few days later, Davis demanded a public apology, but instead the two officers argued noisily and physically, concluding in Davis mortally wounding Nelson with a pistol.

Davis avoided conviction due to the shortage of experienced commanders in the Union Army, but the incident hampered his chances for promotion. He served as a corps commander under William Tecumseh Sherman during his March to the Sea in 1864. After the war, Davis was the first commander of the Department of Alaska from 1867 to 1870, and assumed field command during the Modoc War of 1872–1873.

== Early life ==
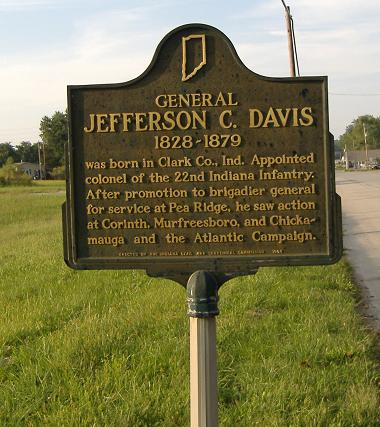
Marker denoting Davis' birth near Memphis, Indiana

Jefferson C. Davis was born in Clark County, Indiana, near present-day Memphis, Indiana. He was born to William Davis Jr. (1800–1879) and Mary Drummond-Davis (1801–1881), the oldest of their eight children. His father was a farmer. His parents came from Kentucky, and like many at the time, including President Abraham Lincoln's family, moved to Indiana.

== Early military career ==
When Davis was 18 years old, in June 1846, he joined the 3rd Indiana Volunteers. He enlisted as a soldier during the Mexican–American War. Through the war, he received promotions through the rank of sergeant. He received a commission as a second lieutenant, in the First U.S. Artillery, in June 1848. He received the promotion for bravery at Buena Vista. He joined the 1st Artillery in October 1848 at Fort McHenry, outside of Baltimore, Maryland. He later moved south to Fort Washington, Maryland, just outside Washington DC, and again to the coast of Mississippi. He was promoted again to first lieutenant in February 1852 and was transferred to Florida in 1853 and on to Fortress Monroe in Virginia. In 1857, he was stationed again in Fort McHenry moving to Florida in 1858. In the summer of 1858, he received a transfer to Fort Moultrie, South Carolina. Fort Moultrie was located near Fort Sumter and Charleston, South Carolina. He remained in South Carolina until Fort Sumter was evacuated at the beginning of the Civil War, in 1861.

== Civil War ==
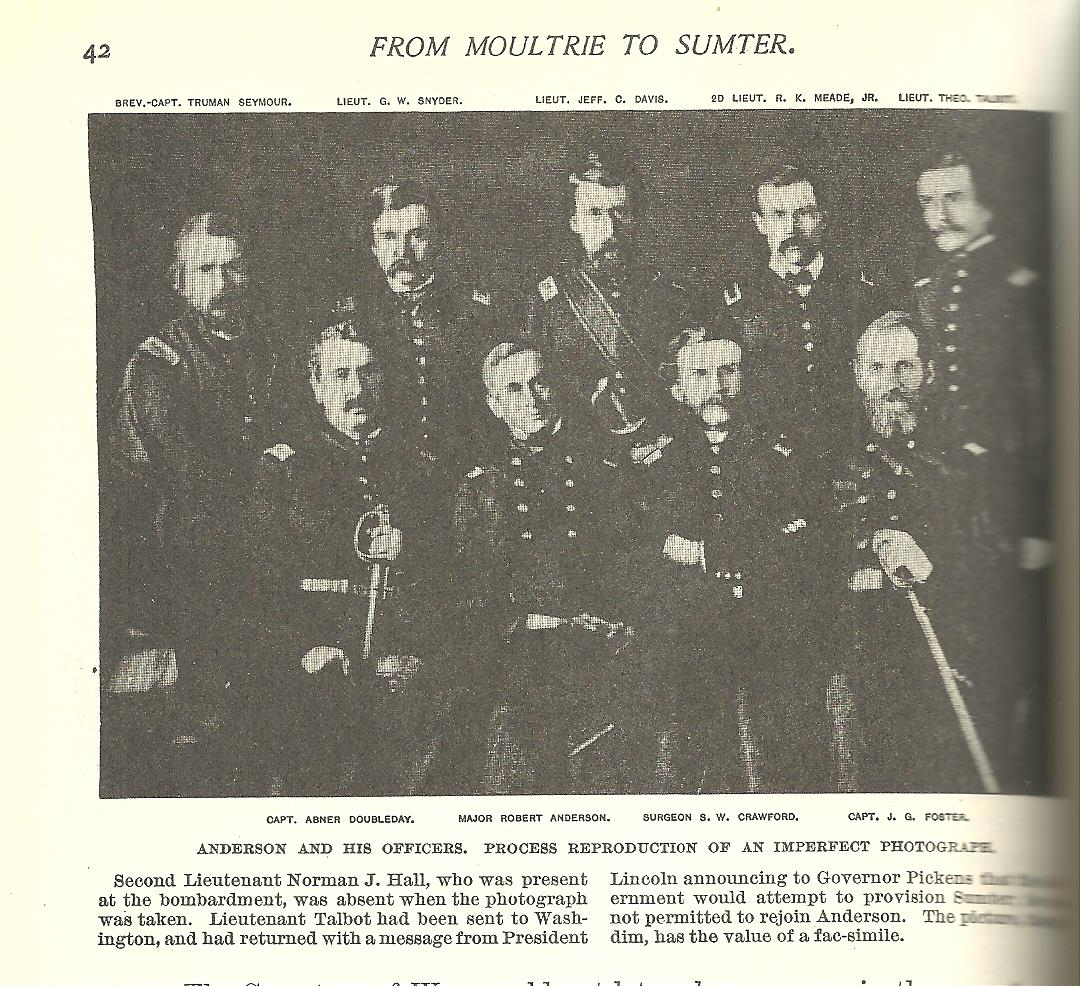
Major Robert Anderson and his officers Ft Sumter South Carolina

When the war began in April 1861, Davis was an officer in the garrison at Fort Sumter when it was bombarded by Confederate forces. The following month he was promoted to captain and given the task of raising a regiment in Indiana. Additionally, he was given responsibility over the commissary and supply. He requested assignment as a regimental commander, growing bored with his garrison duties. After the death of Brigadier General Nathaniel Lyon and the loss at Wilson's Creek, (Note: Battle of Wilson's Creek is now preserved within Wilson's Creek National Battlefield, protected by the National Park Service. The park is located near Republic, Missouri.) his request was gratefully accepted. His experience as a regular in the federal army made him a rare commodity, and he was given command of the 22nd Indiana Infantry Regiment, receiving a promotion to colonel.

=== Missouri ===
By the end of August, Davis received orders to succeed Brigadier General Ulysses S. Grant as commander of forces in northwestern Missouri. His headquarters were in Jefferson City, Missouri, with approximately 16,000 Confederate troops nearby. General Fremont had great concerns that the Confederate troops, commanded by Generals McCulloch and Sterling Price, would set their eyes on St. Louis as a potential target. Davis's command grew quickly, starting at 12,000 at the beginning of September and expanding to 18,000 to 20,000 by the end of the month. Initially, Davis spent time building fortifications to fend off possible attack on the capital city. Once his defensive plan had been completed, he planned an offensive campaign, but materiel was refused to Davis. That may have contributed to losing the Battle of Lexington. (Note: Battle of Lexington State Historic Site preserves the battlefield at Lexington, Missouri. The area is administered and protected by the Division of State Parks of the Missouri Department of Natural Resources. * Another point of interest in the area is a cannon ball that hit and remains in a column of the Lafayette County Court House.)

In December 1861, he took command of the 3rd Division, Army of the Southwest. He pursued Confederate troops through southern Missouri, as they retreated toward and into Arkansas. In March 1862, his division attacked the Confederates at the Battle of Pea Ridge. (Note: The Battle of Pea Ridge is preserved today as Pea Ridge National Military Park, protected by the National Park Service. The park is located in northwestern Arkansas near Garfield, Arkansas.) Davis's distinguished service at Pea Ridge was rewarded in May 1862 when he received a field promotion commensurate with his division command. He was made Brigadier General with the rank backdated to December 18, 1861.

At the Siege of Corinth, he commanded the 4th Division, Army of the Mississippi. (Note: Shiloh National Military Park preserves the Corinth battlefield. The area is administered and protected by the National Park Service. The park is located in northern Mississippi, in Corinth.)

=== Leave authorized ===
In the late summer of 1862, Davis became ill, probably caused by exhaustion. He wrote to his commander, General Rosecrans, requesting a few weeks' leave. Davis stated, "After twenty-one months of arduous service.... I find myself compelled by physical weakness and exhaustion to ask... for a few weeks' respite from duty...." On August 12, 1862, the Army of Mississippi issued General Rosecrans' response in Special Order No. 208, authorizing General Davis 20 days of convalescence. Davis headed for home in Indiana to rest and recuperate.

While Davis was on leave, the state of affairs in Kentucky became quite precarious. The Army of the Ohio, commanded by Brigadier General Don Carlos Buell, was taking aim on Chattanooga, Tennessee. Three hundred miles of railway lines lay between Louisville and Chattanooga, and Confederate forces were making constant work tearing up the tracks. The railroads provided the needed supplies to Union troops on the move and so Buell was forced to split his forces and to send General William "Bull" Nelson back north to Kentucky to take charge of the area. When Nelson arrived in Louisville, he found Major General Horatio G. Wright had been sent by the President to take control, putting Buell second in command.

In late August, two Confederate armies, under the command of Major General Edmund Kirby Smith and General Braxton Bragg, moved into Kentucky and Tennessee on the offensive to drive Union forces from Kentucky. Smith's Army of East Tennessee had approximately 19,000 men and Bragg's Army of Tennessee had approximately 35,000. On August 23, 1862, Confederate cavalry met and defeated Union troops at the Battle of Big Hill. That was only a prelude to the bigger battle ahead; on August 29, 1862, portions of Smith's army met an equal portion of Nelson's force that numbered between 6,000 and 7,000. The two-day Battle of Richmond, ending on August 30, was an overwhelming Confederate victory in all aspects: Union casualties numbered over 5,000, compared to the 750 Confederate casualties, and considerable ground was lost, including Richmond; Lexington; and the state capital, Frankfort. Further loss at the battle occurred with the capture of Brigadier General Mahlon D. Manson and the wounding of General Nelson, injured in the neck, who was forced to retreat back to Louisville to prepare for the presumed assault. The Confederates were now in a position to aim northward to take the fight to the enemy.

=== Louisville ===
Davis was quite aware of the circumstances in the neighboring state to the south; Smith was able to strike at Cincinnati, Ohio, Bragg and/or Smith at Louisville. Davis, still on convalescence, reported to General Wright, whose headquarters were in Cincinnati to offer his services. Wright ordered Davis to report to Nelson. In Louisville, Davis was put in charge of organizing and arming its citizens, preparing for its defense.

Nelson was quite an imposing figure over Davis. William Nelson got his nickname, "Bull," in no small part to his stature. Nelson was 300 pounds and six feet two inches and was described as being "in the prime of life, in perfect health." Davis was quite small in comparison, measuring five feet nine inches and reportedly only 125 pounds.

==== Dismissal from Louisville ====
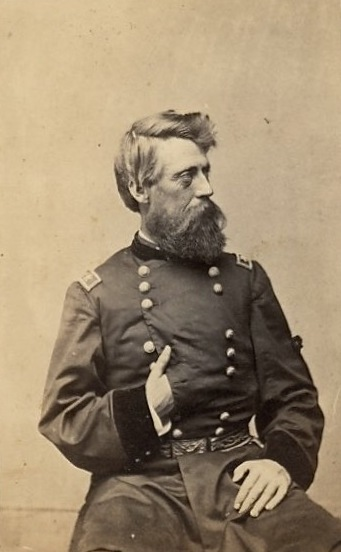

In September 22, two days after Davis received his initial orders from Nelson, he was summoned to the Galt House, where Nelson had made his headquarters. Nelson inquired on how the recruitment was going and how many men had been mustered. Davis replied that he did not know. As Nelson asked his questions and received only short answers that Davis was unaware of any specifics, Nelson became enraged and expelled Davis from Louisville. General James Barnet Fry, described as a close friend of Davis, was present and later wrote of the events surrounding the death of Nelson. Fry states:

Davis arose and remarked, in a cool, deliberate manner: "General Nelson, I am a regular soldier, and I demand the treatment due to me as a general officer." Davis then stepped across to the door of the Medical Director's room, both doors being open... and said: "Dr Irwin, I wish you to be a witness to this conversation." At the same time Nelson said: "Yes, doctor, I want you to remember this." Davis then said to Nelson: "I demand from you the courtesy due to my rank." Nelson replied: "I will treat you as you deserve. You have disappointed me; you have been unfaithful to the trust which I reposed in you, and I shall relieve you at once. You are relieved from duty here and you will proceed to Cincinnati and report to General Wright." Davis said: "You have no authority to order me." Nelson turned toward the Adjutant-General and said: "Captain, if General Davis does not leave the city by nine o'clock tonight, give instructions to the Provost-Marshal to see that he shall be put across the Ohio River."

==== Reassigned to Louisville ====
Davis made his way to Cincinnati and reported to General Wright within a few days. Within the same week, Buell returned to Louisville and took command from Nelson. Wright then felt that with Buell in command at Louisville, there was no need to keep Davis from Louisville, where his leadership was desperately needed and so sent Davis back to there.

Davis arrived in Louisville in the afternoon on Sunday, September 28, and reported to the Galt House early the next morning, at breakfast time. The Galt House continued to serve as the command's headquarters for both Buell and Nelson. That, like on most other mornings, was the meeting place for many of the most prominent military and civil leaders. When Davis arrived and looked around the room, he saw many familiar faces and joined Oliver P. Morton, Indiana's governor.

==== Killing of Nelson ====
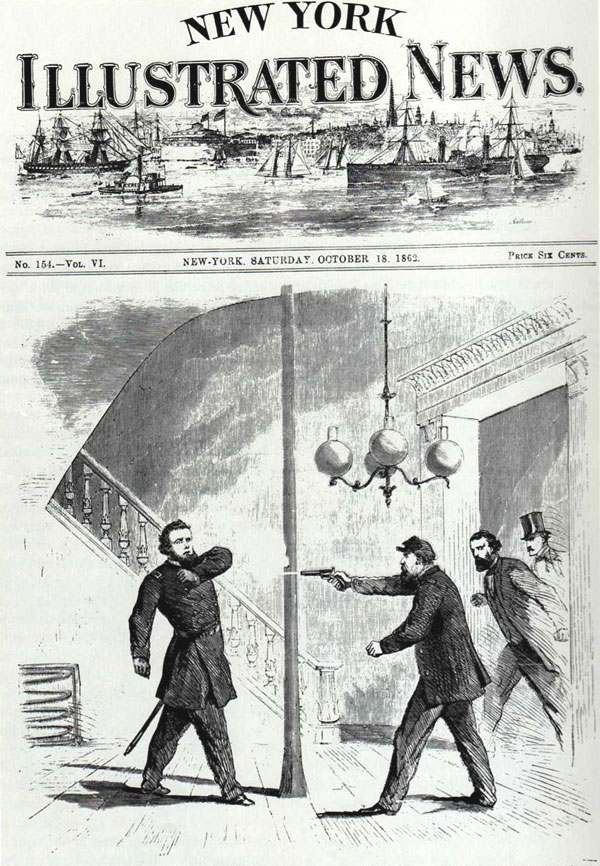
Fanciful depiction of General Nelson being shot by fellow Union General Jefferson C. Davis at the Galt House in Louisville, Kentucky, on September 29, 1862

A short time later, General Nelson entered the hotel and went to the front desk. Davis approached Nelson, asking for an apology for the offense that Nelson had previously made. Nelson dismissed Davis and said, "Go away you damned puppy, I don't want anything to do with you!" Davis took in his hand a registration card and, while he confronted Nelson, took his anger out on the card, first by gripping it and then by wadding it up into a small ball, which he took and flipped into Nelson's face. Nelson stepped forward and slapped Davis with the back of his hand in the face. (Note: Some accounts say that Nelson slapped Davis twice with the back of his hand.) Nelson then looked at the governor and asked, "Did you come here, sir, to see me insulted?" (Note: Some accounts say "Did you come here to insult me, too?") Morton said, "No sir." Then, Nelson turned and left for his room.

That set the events in motion. Davis asked a friend from the Mexican–American War if he had a pistol, which he did not. He then asked another friend, Thomas W. Gibson, from whom he got a pistol. Immediately, Davis went down the corridor towards Nelson's office, where he was now standing. He aimed the pistol at Nelson and fired. The bullet hit Nelson in the chest and tore a small hole in the heart, mortally wounding the large man. Nelson still had the strength to make his way to the hotel stairs and to climb a floor before he collapsed. By then, a crowd started to gather around him and carried Nelson to a nearby room, laying him on the floor. The hotel proprietor, Silas F. Miller, came rushing into the room to find Nelson lying on the floor. Nelson asked of Miller, "Send for a clergyman; I wish to be baptized. I have been basely murdered." Reverend J. Talbot was called, who responded, as well as a doctor. Several people came to see Nelson, including Reverend Talbot, Surgeon Murry, General Crittenden and General Fry. The shooting had occurred at 8:00 am, and by 8:30, Nelson was dead. (Note: The events of late September 1862 had as many accounts of the events as there were witnesses to them.)

==== Arrest and release ====
Davis did not leave the vicinity of Nelson. He did not run or evade capture. He was simply taken into military custody by Fry and confined to an upper room in the Galt House. Davis attested to Fry what had happened. Fry wrote that while Davis was improperly treated for a man of his rank, he never pursued any legal recourse, which there was available to him. Fry attested that Davis was quite forthcoming and even included the fact that it was he who flipped a paper-wad in the face of Nelson. Davis wanted to confront Nelson publicly and wanted Nelson's disrespect to be witnessed. What Davis had not accounted for was Nelson's physical assault. Everything then spiraled out of control.

Many in close confidence with Nelson wanted to see quick justice with regards to Davis. There were a few, including General William Terrill, who wanted to see Davis hanged on the spot. Buell weighed in by saying that Davis' conduct was inexcusable. Fry stated that Buell regarded the actions as "a gross violation of military discipline." Buell went on to telegraph General Henry Halleck, General in Chief of all Armies:

General H.W. Halleck:

Brigadier-General Davis is under arrest at Louisville for the killing of General Nelson. His trial by a court-martial or military commission should take place immediately, but I can't spare officers from the army now in motion to compose a court. It can perhaps better be done from Washington....

D.C. Buell,

Major-General.

It was Major General Horatio G. Wright who came to Davis's aid by securing his release and returning him to duty. Davis avoided conviction for the murder because there was a need for experienced field commanders in the Union Army. Fry stated in his journal of Wright's comments,

Davis appealed to me, and I notified him that he should no longer consider himself in arrest.... I was satisfied that Davis acted purely on the defensive in the unfortunate affair, and I presumed that Buell held very similar views, as he took no action in the matter after placing him in arrest.

Davis was released from custody on October 13, 1862. Military regulations required charges to be formally made against the accused within 45 days of the arrest. The charges never came possibly because larger events, such as the launching of Buell's campaign in Kentucky five days later, overshadowed the Davis-Nelson affair.

==== Aftermath ====
There was no trial or any significant confinement since it appears that Davis was staying at the Galt House without guard, as based partly on Wright's statement. Davis simply walked away and returned to duty as if nothing had ever happened.

=== Western Campaign ===
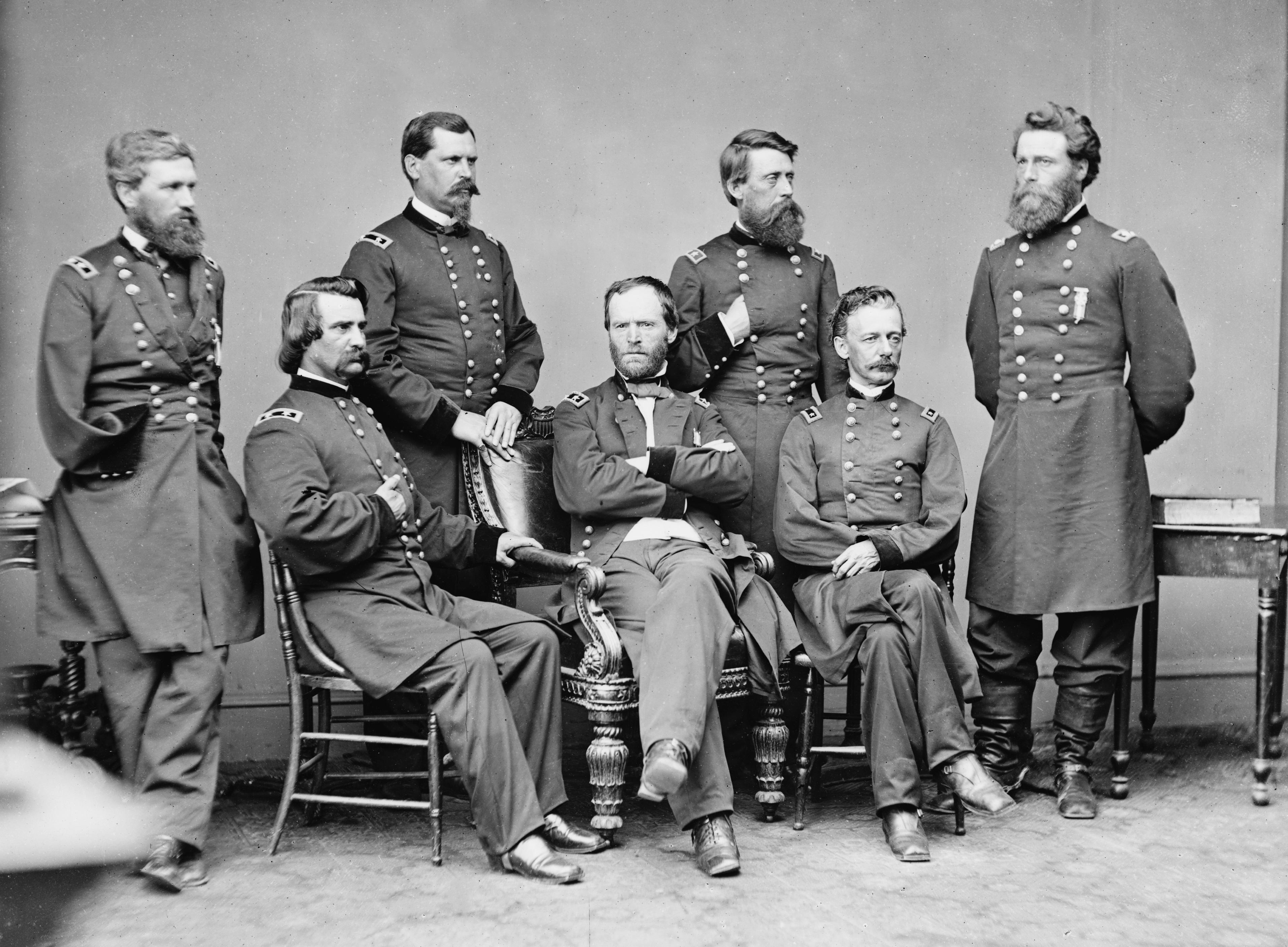
Gen. Davis, second from right, with hand in coat, standing behind General William T. Sherman (seated at center), with other members of Sherman's staff

Davis was a capable commander, but because of the murder of Nelson, he never received a full promotion higher than brigadier general of volunteers. He, however, received a brevet promotion to major general of volunteers on August 8, 1864, for his service at the Battle of Kennesaw Mountain, and he was appointed commanding officer of the XIV Corps during the Atlanta campaign, which he retained until the end of the war. He received a brevet promotion to brigadier general in the regular army on March 20, 1865.

During Sherman's March to the Sea, Davis's actions during the Ebenezer Creek passing and ruthlessness toward former slaves have caused his legacy to be clouded in continued controversy. As Sherman's army proceeded toward Savannah, Georgia, on December 9, 1864, Davis ordered a pontoon bridge removed before the African-American refugees, who were following his corps, could cross the creek. Several hundred were captured by the Confederate cavalry or drowned in the creek while they attempted to escape.

== Postbellum career ==
=== Department of Alaska ===
After the Civil War, Davis continued service with the army, becoming colonel of the 23rd Infantry Regiment in July 1866. In his capacity as commander of the newly created Military District of Alaska he was present at the transfer of Alaska from Russia to the United States on October 18, 1867; and he was the first commander of the Department of Alaska from March 18, 1868, to June 1, 1870.

=== Modoc War ===
Davis gained fame when he assumed command of the US forces in California and Oregon during the Modoc War of 1872–1873, after General Edward Canby and Reverend Eleazer Thomas had been assassinated during peace talks. Davis's presence in the field restored the soldiers' confidence after their recent setbacks against the Modoc. Davis's campaign resulted in the Battle of Dry Lake (May 10, 1873) and the eventual surrender of notable leaders, such as Hooker Jim and Captain Jack.

=== 1877 general strike ===
During the 1877 St. Louis general strike, Davis arrived in St. Louis, commanding 300 men and two Gatling guns, but refused on urging to quell strikers or run the trains. He stated that doing so would be beyond his orders to protect government and public property.

=== Death ===
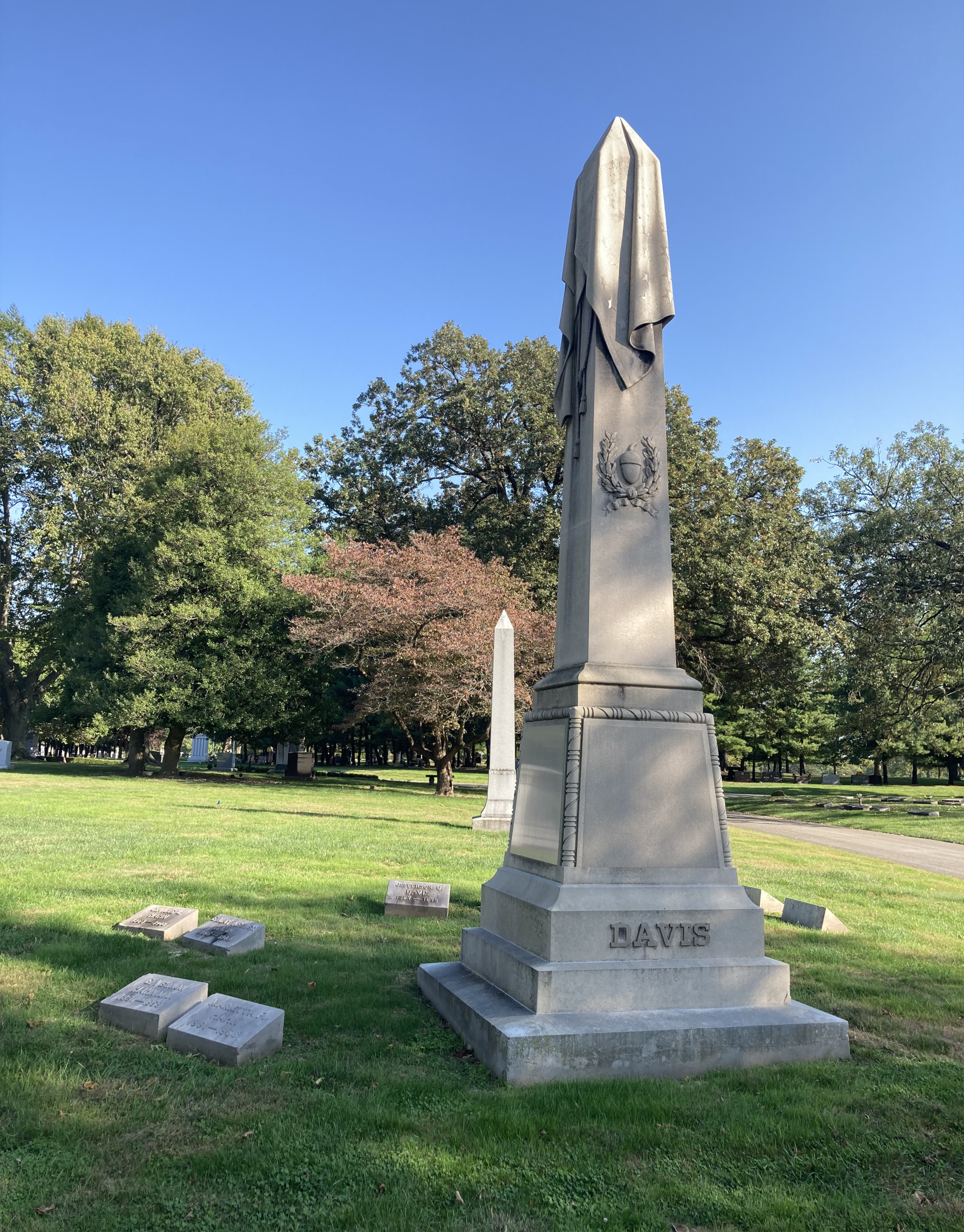
Davis's grave at Crown Hill Cemetery

Davis died in Chicago, Illinois, on November 30, 1879. He is buried in Crown Hill Cemetery in Indianapolis, Indiana.

== In fiction ==
Jefferson C. Davis is a character in the historical novel Forty-Ninth by Boris Pronsky and Craig Britton.

== See also ==
- List of American Civil War generals (Union)
- Louisville in the American Civil War
- Sherman's March
- Sherman's March to the Sea

== Notes ==
Military offices
Preceded by Prince Dmitri Maksutov as Governor of Russian Alaska	Military Commander of Alaska; 1867–1870	Succeeded by Brevet Lt. Col. George K. Brady
