= Take This Lollipop =

2011 film by Jason Zada

Take this Lollipop
- Film poster
- Directed by: Jason Zada
- Written by: Jason Zada; Jason Nickel
- Produced by: Jason Zada; Brendan Kling
- Starring: Bill Oberst Jr.
- Cinematography: Mihai Mălaimare Jr.
- Edited by: Jason Zada
- Music by: Bobby Jameson
- Production companies: Little Monster; Tool of North America
- Distributed by: Tool of North America
- Release date: October 17, 2011 (Internet)
- Running time: 2 minutes, 38 seconds
- Country: United States
- Language: English

Take This Lollipop is a 2011 interactive horror short film and Facebook app written and directed by Jason Zada. Developer Jason Nickel used Facebook Connect to bring viewers themselves into the film, through the use of pictures and messages from their own Facebook profiles. Starring actor Bill Oberst Jr. as 'The Facebook Stalker', the film acts to personalize and underscore the dangers inherent in posting too much personal information about oneself on the internet. The information gathered from a viewer's Facebook profile by the film's app is used once and then deleted. The title is derived from the 1963 song "Please Little Girl Take This Lollipop", written and performed by singer-songwriter Bobby Jameson, which is used in the film.

According to Zada, Take This Lollipop was taken offline "a few months" prior to August 2018. The film's website now hosts a new version of Take This Lollipop, now a horror game about a meeting. However, as of 2022, the website now hosts both experiences, albeit for $3.00 to access.

== Synopsis ==
The interactive film first requests that viewers temporarily allow the application access to their Facebook account, and then incorporates information gleaned from the viewer's Facebook page to fill in details of the film itself.

Showing 'The Facebook Stalker' as a thin, creepy man, hunched over and typing at a computer keyboard, images provided from the accessed Facebook account begin to appear as the stalker types at his keyboard, and appears to search for the specific Facebook user who had granted access. The Stalker becomes more and more agitated as he scrolls through the discovered information, until he locates the home of the user, pulls up Google Maps, and finds directions to the user's home from geographic data contained in his or her profile. With the user's profile picture taped to its dashboard, the stalker is then seen driving in his car to the user's location, apparently to perform mayhem.

At the end of the film, a screen appears with an image of a blue lollipop containing a razor blade. Below the image is the viewer's Facebook screenname and the name of the stalker's next victim as gleaned from the viewer's own profile.

== Production ==
=== Concept ===
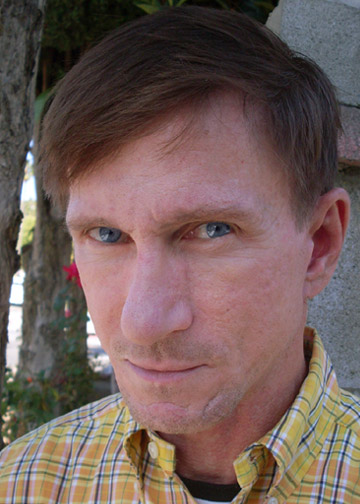
Bill Oberst Jr. (pictured) portrays the ominous Facebook stalker in Take This Lollipop.

The title comes from a parents' warning to children to avoid taking candy from strangers.

The concept developed from director Jason Zada's attraction to horror films from his youth, his wish to do something serious within that genre, his experience as a digital editor, and his understanding that people place their personal information on the internet for anyone to find. He decided to create a project that would "get under people's skin without any gore or anything", and that would underscore its point by making it about the viewer in a quite personal manner. The writer/director came up with the idea in September 2011, after waking up one morning and thinking about how he loved the Halloween season. Zada explained, "I wanted to do something that messed with people and I wrote the script. Instantly, I knew there was something special about the idea." He briefly toyed with the idea of using an "A-list" actor, but instead chose character actor Bill Oberst Jr. for both his look and his skill. He stated, "When I saw Bill's headshot, I knew he was the guy. It was a twist of a role and Bill was the right type and he'd done horror movies. Some actors would overdo it, the audience needed to see what you're doing without thinking. I wanted people to feel his anger and discomfort with minimal movements. Bill went deep. He trusted the process." Oberst himself spoke toward his development of 'The Facebook Stalker' persona, saying "It was easy to get into character. The filming environment was an abandoned and reputedly haunted hospital, that helped and Jason's script and direction did the rest. Stepping onto the dressed and lit set and sitting at that desk, it was very easy to feel the vibe."

An earlier viral video by Zada was the Elf Yourself project for OfficeMax which had been seen by 194 million people in its first six weeks. Being a fan of "exploring human interaction with media", Zada used similar techniques for Take This Lollipop, but tapped into what he sees as the "larger collective fear we have now" toward personal information being on the internet.

=== Marketing ===
The project had no real marketing at all, beyond its YouTube trailer and then an initial release on October 17, 2011, to a few personal friends, who then wrote about it on Twitter. Within 24 hours of release, the film had been watched approximately 400,000 times and had over 30,000 "likes" on Facebook. A week later, the film had been viewed 7 million times with 1.1 million "likes". As of March 4, 2012, the film had received nearly 13 million "likes" on Facebook.

=== Release ===
The trailer for this film was posted to YouTube on October 14, 2011, and the film and website themselves went live one week later, on October 17, 2011. The site was blocked temporarily by Facebook as a malicious app, but after Zada clarified that no Facebook information was being misused or shared, the site was unblocked.

=== Music ===
Director Jason Zada revealed on his Twitter page that the music used in the video was "Please Little Girl Take This Lollipop", a 1963 single by singer-songwriter Bobby Jameson, and according to music production company Little Ears, it was scored by Future Perfect and mistimed for creepy effect. Jameson wrote on his blog: "It took a lot of hard work to get the credit for the use of my song. No money, but at least I am credited for my work."

== Reception ==
The interactive film has received both national and international attention, with coverage on 20minutes, Sky Italia, Les Numeriques, TendanceOuest, Stern Magazine, Site Oueb. and International Business Times, and continued discussions over how to protect children when they are using the internet, with coverage by such as the New Zealand Herald, CNN, and Persoenlich.

Digital Trends admired the film's drawing of attention to the dangers of posting too much personal information online, writing that the film was "a creative way to simultaneously grab your attention and scare you into being a little more careful with your Facebook information." Ad Age praised the film, writing "The piece, which integrates your Facebook photos and location information into an eerie short film, combines great storytelling, high-production values and visual elements that are so realistic you'll think twice about letting your kids on". The New York Times made note of the uniqueness of the film in that it starred the viewer, and that each viewer would see themselves in the film as established through their own Facebook profile. Forbes wrote that the film was "designed to prey on any Facebook privacy fears you may have, especially if you have a dirty, sweaty ex-boyfriend who resembles the guy in the video (Bill Oberst)". The film was called a "scaremongering app" by Adweek, which wrote "Sharing stuff on Facebook is scary. You could be tracked down and hacked to death by a maniac!"

CNN reported that the film took the worst fears about posting personal information on the internet, and turned them into "2 minutes of horror." In noting the film's introductory page, displaying an image of a lollipop with a razor blade in it, the network reminded viewers of the parental advice to children that they should not take candy from strangers. Though explaining that the film's application uses a viewer's Facebook data only once, and then deletes it, CNN offered that "the creepy results just might make you think twice about who else gets access to your online information." Director Jason Zada explained that the clip was intended to spur thought about how much information we share online. He commented, "Our privacy was dead a while back and will never be the same. Life as a whole has changed. If you look at the video, the scariest part is that your information is in the video. The piece is scary because a person is violating your privacy, not because it's bloody or there's anything jumping out." The Star-Ledger reported that the film has growing popularity, due to its being novel, but that such popularity is also found in how the horror short "touches upon our concerns about private information and how it could be misused if it falls into the wrong hands." GlobalPost reported that the film had gone viral as a "customized horror movie that stars you and your friends".

In discussing how parents must educate their children about the dangers inherent in a releasing of personal information about themselves to the internet, CNN wrote "Behind the litany of frightening facts and figures (not to mention fears like those preyed upon in viral-video Take This Lollipop, an interactive horror film that incorporates text and images from your Facebook profile) lurks a disturbing truth."

== Recognition ==
The website 'Co.Create' listed the film as among 'The 5 All-Time Best Facebook Campaigns', calling it "One of the most interesting Facebook campaigns".

=== Awards and nominations ===
- March 2012, Won three awards at SXSW: Overall 'Best in Show', first place in category 'Experimental', and first place in category 'Motion Graphics'.
- April 2012, Won D&AD Award for 'Digital Advertising/Web Films'.
- April 2012, nominated for Andy Award for 'Agency Innovation'.
- April 2012, nominated for two Webby Awards, under categories 'Experimental and Weird', and 'Viral'.
- May 2012, Won Daytime Emmy Award for 'New Approaches - Daytime Entertainment'.
