= Forced March =

- Directed by: Rick King
- Written by: Charles Bardosh; Dick Atkins
- Produced by: Dick Atkins
- Starring: Chris Sarandon
- Release date: November 3, 1989 (New York City)
- Running time: 104 minutes
- Countries: United States; Hungary
- Language: English

Forced March is a 1989 American-Hungarian historical war drama film written by Charles Bardosh and Dick Atkins, directed by Rick King and starring Chris Sarandon.

== Cast ==
- Chris Sarandon as Ben Kline
- Renée Soutendijk as Myra
- Josef Sommer as Richard
- John Seitz as Hardy

== Release ==
The film was released in New York City on November 3, 1989.

== Reception ==
TV Guide gave the film a negative review: "Despite capable performances and good direction by Rick King, this behind-the-scenes drama suffers from an excess of thematic baggage in its attempts to come to grips with the Holocaust's meaning to its victims and their descendants."
