= Janet Carroll =

American actress

- Carroll in 1970
- Born: Janet Thiese; December 24, 1940; Chicago, Illinois. U.S.
- Died: May 22, 2012 (aged 71); Manhattan, New York City, U.S.
- Occupations: Actress, singer
- Years active: 1960s–2011
- Children: 2

Janet Carroll (born Janet Thiese; December 24, 1940 – May 22, 2012) was an American film, stage and television character actress.

Carroll's career spanned more than four decades and included major and supporting roles in Broadway musicals, television and Hollywood films. She is perhaps best-known for her portrayal of the oblivious mother of Joel (Tom Cruise) in the 1983 film Risky Business.

== Early life ==
Carroll received formal theatrical training and began acting professionally in the late 1960s, appearing in numerous productions in local theaters. She then became a regular at Starlight Theatre in Kansas City, Missouri, where she acted during five seasons.

She began classical training at age 12 with Greta Allum in Chicago. Over the years she continued building and expanding her voice and repertoire in formal study with Douglas Susu-Mago. With a fluent 3½-octave vocal range, she was able to sing everything from opera to jazz and Broadway style to gospel music and Dixieland genre.

Carroll sang as a first soprano with the Canterbury Choral Society at Carnegie Hall and other venues across New York City.

== Career ==
Carroll then performed in Kansas City and Chicago, assuming significant roles in such musicals as Carousel, Guys and Dolls, Gypsy, Hello, Dolly!, Mame, South Pacific and The Pajama Game, before moving to California, where she continued her stage work, winning a Drama-Logue Award for her performance as Klytemnestra in Ezra Pound's Elektra.

Besides Risky Business, Carroll appeared in more than 20 other films over the next three decades, including Secret Admirer (1985), The Killing Time (1987), Memories of Me (1988), Family Business (1989), Talent for the Game (1991), Destiny Turns on the Radio (1995), Forces of Nature (1999), The Omega Code and Enough (2002), among others. She developed her television career with recurring roles on the series Hill Street Blues (1983, 1986 as Peggy LaRue Nelson), The Bronx Zoo (1987 as Carol Danzig), Murphy Brown (1990–96, as Doris Dial, stoic anchorman Jim Dial's wife), Melrose Place (1993–97, as Marion Shaw, Kimberly's mother), Married... with Children (1994–97, as Gary, Al Bundy's boss), and Still Standing (2002–04, as Helen Michaels).

From 2004 to 2005, she starred on Broadway creating the role of "Aunt March" in the original musical Little Women, which is based in the 1869 novel of the same title written by American author Louisa May Alcott. She promoted brands such as Century 21, Diet Coke, Outback Steakhouse and Holiday Inn, among others, in television advertisement spots.

Since 1982, she had performed as a singer at Jazz Festivals throughout the United States and Canada, being accompanied by her seven-piece format, while interpreting traditional jazz, swing, blues, and classic ballads or the Great American Songbook. She performed in Victoria and Vancouver summer festivals in British Columbia, as well as in Monterey, Los Angeles, Newport Beach, Santa Catalina Island, and New Orleans stages, along with concerts at United Service Organizations shows, the Palmer House in Chicago, the Fountainebleu in Miami Beach, the Ritz-Carlton chain, the Biltmore Hotel in Coral Gables and the San Antonio River Walk. At the Redding Jazz Festival, she was honored with an award for Best Vocalist. In 2004, she was the featured performer at the Porrath Foundation for Cancer Patient Advocacy Event tribute to film star Rhonda Fleming.

After twelve years of formal training Janet Carroll was ordained and licensed at the West Los Angeles' Church of Inner Light. An active participant in social issues, Carroll was a longstanding member of the Screen Actor's Guild and American Federation of Radio Artists and Actors Equity Association. She also served as the Artistic Director of The Jazz Series at Simi Valley's Cultural Arts Center. She was a V.P. on the executive board of directors of the Society of Singers and founder and co-chair of the Victory Ball in Westport, Connecticut.

In 1992, Carroll collaborated as a singer on the album This Joint Is Jumpin' Live! – Beverly Hills Unlisted Jazz Band, a recording project led by dixieland trombonist and actor Conrad Janis. She later released her solo albums Presenting... Janet Carroll and the Hollywood Jazz Cats (1992), I Can't Give You Anything But Love (2000), I'll Be Seeing You (2000) and Lady Be Good (2010).

By 2011, she was preparing the production of her fourth and fifth records titled A Tribute to the Great Ladies of Song! and Scorch Your Shorts Torch Songs!. She was diagnosed with brain cancer later that year and took a leave of absence. She underwent surgery and chemotherapy unsuccessfully. She had two sons, George and Tom Brown. Tom predeceased her in 1978.

== Death ==
Carroll died on May 22, 2012, from brain cancer at her home in Manhattan, aged 71.

== Filmography ==
=== Film ===
Year	Title	Role	Notes
1983	Risky Business	Joel's Mother	
1985	Secret Admirer	Toni's Mother	
1987	The Killing Time	Lila Daggett	
1988	Memories of Me	Dorothy Davis	
1989	Family Business	Margie	
1990	The Platinum Triangle	Lt. Smith	
1991	Talent for the Game	Rachel Bodeen	
1995	Born to Be Wild	Judge Billings	
1995	Destiny Turns on the Radio	Escabel	
1995	Timemaster	Miss Spinell	
1999	Forces of Nature	Barbara	
1999	The Omega Code	Dorothy Thompson	
2001	All You Need	Jane Sabistan	
2002	Changing Hearts	Mrs. Lane	
2002	Enough	Mrs. Hiller	
2002	The Marriage Undone	Judge Dunbar	
2005	Confession	Mother Superior	
2005	Living 'til the End	Constance Whilton	
2007	Beyond the Quest	Julia Baron	
2009	(Untitled)	Helen Finkelstein	
2009	The Art of War III: Retribution	Secretary General Barnes	
2011	What Happens Next	Gloria	
2015	College Debts	Grandma Clare	Posthumous Release
2016	Crosser	Julia Barron	Final Film Role, Posthumous Release

=== Television ===
Year	Title	Role	Notes
1983	Knight Rider	Denise Merritt	Episode: "Soul Survivor"
1983, 1986	Hill Street Blues	Peg / Peggy	2 episodes
1984	Getting Physical	Myra Gibley	Television film
1984	E/R	Beth	Episode: "Son of Sheinfeld"
1984	Son of Sheinfeld	Assistant	Television film
1984, 1985	Spencer	Donna	2 episodes
1985	Alice	Dr. Rose Goodwin	Episode: "Kiss the Grill Goodbye"
1985	Cagney & Lacey	Helene Ledding	Episode: "Con Games"
1985	Double Dare	Lt. Samantha Warner	6 episodes
1986	Mary	Rachel	Episode: "The Death Threat"
1986	The Right of the People	Marjorie	Television film
1986	The Twilight Zone	Marilyn Cavendish	Episode: "Cold Reading"
1986	Samaritan: The Mitch Snyder Story	Susan Baker	Television film
1986	You Again?	Stacey Wendell	Episode: "Marry Me A
1987	The Golden Girls	Phyllis Hammerow	Episode: "The Actor"
1987	Silver Spoons	Arlene	Episode: "Hero Worship"
1987	Designing Women	Sissy Tate	Episode: "Seams from a Marriage"
1987	Bluffing It	Margaret Duggan	Television film
1987	A Year in the Life	Joanne	2 episodes
1987	227	Emily Mortimer	Episode: "The Facade"
1987–1988	The Bronx Zoo	Carol Danzig	8 episodes
1988	21 Jump Street	Mrs. Poolish	Episode: "A Big Disease with a Little Name"
1988	L.A. Law	Judge Geraldine Parker	Episode: "Hey, Lick Me Over"
1988–1989	The Boys	Marjorie	4 episodes
1989	Jake and the Fatman	Joan Thompson	Episode: "I'll Never Smile Again"
1989	Quantum Leap	Janie Wilson	Episode: "Camikazi Kid"
1989	When He's Not a Stranger	Counselor	Television film
1990	Mancuso, F.B.I.	Corinne	Episode: "Shiva Me Timbers"
1990	Glory Days	Mrs Lovejoy	Episode: "The Kids Are Allright"
1990	Life Goes On	Elaine Oslot	Episode: "Corky and the Dolphins"
1990	Empty Nest	Leah	Episode: "There's No Accounting"
1990	The Famous Teddy Z	Fay Parr	Episode: "Teddy's Big Date"
1990–1996	Murphy Brown	Doris Dial	10 episodes
1991	Daughters of Privilege	Gail Brody	Television film
1991	Pacific Station	Judy Epstein	Episode: "Waiting for the Other Gumshoe to Drop"
1992	Reasonable Doubts	Tori Slade	Episode: "The Shadow of Death"
1992–1993	The Hat Squad	Kitty	6 episodes
1993–1997	Melrose Place	Marion Shaw	7 episodes
1994	The Mommies	Cindy the Clown	Episode: "A Day in the Life"
1994	Boy Meets World	Nurse Jill	Episode: "I Dream of Feeny"
1994–1997	Married... with Children	Gary	7 episodes
1995	Betrayed: A Story of Three Women	Patty	Television film
1995	Matlock	Anita Montrose	Episode: "The Heist"
1995, 1996	Bonnie	Diane Fulton	2 episodes
1996	Coach	Loretta	Episode: "Somebody's Baby"
1996	Pacific Blue	Dorothy	Episode: "All Jammed Up"
1996	Touched by an Angel	Diana Abernathy	Episode: "Something Blue"
1997	The Jeff Foxworthy Show	Esme Channing	Episode: "Jeff, You the Man"
1998	The Closer	Maude Bertram	Episode: "Dobbs Takes a Holiday"
1998	Living in Captivity	Nancy	Episode: "The Unkindest Cut"
1998	Maggie	Eleanor	2 episodes
1998	Cupid	Dr. Darcy Wyatt	Episode: "End of an Eros"
1999	7th Heaven	Betty Tomlin	Episode: "Yak Sada"
1999	Time of Your Life	Georgia Halloway	Episode: "The Time Sarah Got Her Shih-Tzu Together"
1999	3rd Rock from the Sun	Mrs. Runquist	Episode: "Dial M for Dick"
1999	The Norm Show	Martha	Episode: "Norm vs. Norm"
1999	Beverly Hills, 90210	Patsy Regan	Episode: "Family Tree"
1999	Frank Leaves for the Orient	Frank's Mom	2 episodes
2001	Dead Last	Lucy Vard	Episode: "He Who Smelt It"
2002	Ally McBeal	Ellen Fish	Episode: "What I'll Never Do for Love Again"
2002	Pasadena	Phyllis Cameron	Episode: "The Body"
2002, 2004	Still Standing	Helen Michaels	2 episodes
2003	Judging Amy	Atty. Marx	Episode: "Sixteen Going on Seventeen"
2006	Scrubs	Mrs. Cooke	Episode: "My Own Personal Hell"
2006	Brothers & Sisters	Sloane Dodelson	Episode: "Family Portrait"
2008	The Clown Project	Boob's Mother	Episode: "Boob Visits His Parents!"
2010	Law & Order: SVU	Brenda Fairchild	Episode: "Bullseye"
2011	Christmas Spirit	Betty	Television film
