= Bill Oberst Jr. =

American actor

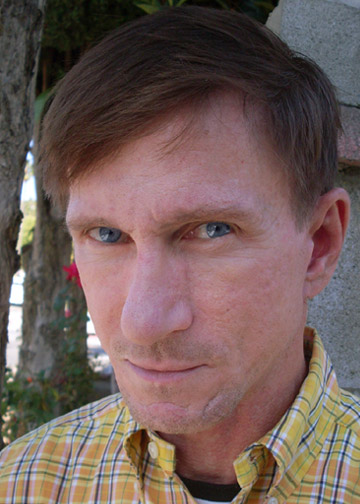
- Bill Oberst Jr. in October 2011
- Born: William Oberst Jr. November 21, 1965 (age 60); South Carolina, U.S.
- Occupation: Actor
- Years active: 1994-present
- Oberst's voice recorded December 2017
- Website: www.billoberst.com

William Oberst Jr. (born November 21, 1965) is an American stage, film, and television actor. Known for his work in horror and cult films, his career includes projects in film, television and one-man-show theater performances. He first received recognition for his portrayals of icon and humorist Lewis Grizzard as performed in theatrical tours across the Southern United States, and played the 'Facebook Stalker' in the 2011 online interactive video film and Facebook app Take This Lollipop and its 2020 sequel.

== Background ==
Oberst Jr. was born and raised in Georgetown, South Carolina, of German descent. He is a graduate of the University of South Carolina. He is a native of Pawleys Island, South Carolina and lives and works in Los Angeles, California.

Oberst admits to having been a "fat kid" when young and says he "started doing imitations of my teachers to entertain the kids who picked on me… They couldn't hit me if they were laughing." This led to his growing up to become an actor and mimic known for bringing historic figures to life.

== Career ==
Oberst has received attention for his many theatrical portrayals of historical figures, including Jesus, Mark Twain, Abraham Lincoln, and John F. Kennedy.

Beginning in 1994, and continuing through 2004, Oberst portrayed Jesus in Jesus of Nazareth. Overlapping, and for the five years from 1996 through 2004, he played John F. Kennedy in the one man show JFK. Iconic historical figures who are revered or demonized by history draw Oberst's interest as an actor. Oberst had also created the one man show Stand Up! When Comedy Was Funny where he featured the classic comedy routines of Rodney Dangerfield, Bob Newhart, Woody Allen, and Moms Mabley.

He was chosen by Lewis Grizzard's widow Dedra and the former manager Steve Enoch to portray the southern icon, and since 1999 has been portraying Grizzard with the touring production that has continued for over 10 years under several names: A Tribute To Lewis Grizzard, Lewis Grizzard Returns, and Lewis Grizzard: In His Own Words.

In 2006, Oberst began his career in film and television career. Since 2008, he has appeared in over 100 independent film and television projects.

Oberst will appear in the upcoming Netflix limited series adaptation All the Sinners Bleed, based on the S. A. Cosby novel of the same name.

== Recognition ==
=== Theater ===
After his very first performance as Kennedy in 1996, a woman from the audience, who identified herself as having served as a secretary in The White House during the Kennedy administration, told Oberst his characterization "made her grieve for the first time in 30 years." Of Oberst's seasonal and one-man interpretation of Charles Dickens's A Christmas Carol, where he creates and plays a dozen different characters in a 45-minute "abridged" version, Kathyrn Martin of The Sun News wrote that in his shorter interpretation Oberst "focuses on the character of Scrooge and, more subtly, the craftsmanship of the original literary work," and "Oberst is a superb actor with an appreciation for both language and history." Though skilled at bringing many characters to life, Oberst's years portraying Grizzard have received the greatest attention: reviewer Jeff Johnson of Charleston's Post and Courier praised Oberst's performance as "an uncanny impersonation;" Alec Harvey of The Birmingham News also felt that his impersonation was impressive: "Oberst, for all intents and purposes, is Grizzard in the show," and he "brings back to life one of the most beloved Southern writers of the 20th century," and Tanya Perez-Brennan of The Florida Times-Union reported that "throughout the performance, Oberst had a commanding stage presence".

=== Film and television ===
Oberst brings this same attention to character detail to television and film. Regarding his portrayal of General William T. Sherman in the History Channel's 2007 Sherman's March, The Atlanta Journal-Constitution reported, alluding to Oberst's prior fame playing Lewis Grizzard, "Could it be? Lewis Grizzard burning Atlanta?" Dorothy Rabinowitz of The Wall Street Journal noted that the docudrama "owes much to the flinty authority of William Oberst Jr., splendid in the role of Sherman." Of his role in Dogs of Chinatown (2008) as Vitario, the mob's second in command, Kung Fu Cinema wrote "[Oberst] is the film's best actor and with his unique looks I can see him carving out a successful dramatic career in Hollywood as a heavy, something he seems to be doing with roles in a couple upcoming horror films."

For Oberst's portrayal as Dale, the slightly "off" backwoods swamp-dwelling Ranger in Dismal (2008), reviewer Dustin Hall of Brutal As Hell wrote, "Something everyone can appreciate is the performance by Bill Oberst Jr. as Dale, who has great screen presence as the patriarch of the flesh-eating family. Only two years into his film career, Bill's played a variety of business and small-town sheriff types, now he lends a malicious glee and a disturbing, penetrating stare to Dismal to surprising effect", and Duane L. Martin of Rogue Cinema wrote, "I don't even know how to describe how great [Oberst] was at bringing just the right personality and intensity to the role. He was the quintessential swamp rat, but at the same time, he was much more than that. The mannerisms and personality he brought to the role made the character memorable. So many times in films like this, these types of characters are just generic and forgettable, but when I look back on this film now, his character is the one that stands out to me the most."

In 2011, Oberst played the creepy "Facebook Stalker" in the online film Take This Lollipop, an interactive video which uses the Facebook Connect application to bring viewers themselves into the film though use of their own pictures and information posted to Facebook, and which underscores the danger when one posts too much personal information online. In describing the opening sequences, CNN wrote "A sweaty, wild-eyed man in a stained undershirt hunches over his computer in a shadowy basement. He's broken into your Facebook account and is reading your posts as his dirty, cracked fingernails paw at the keyboard. Rage (jealousy? hate?) builds as he flips through your photos and scrolls through your list of friends. He rocks back and forth, growing more agitated as the pages flash past. Then he consults a map of your city and heads to his car." Ad Age praised Oberst's portrayal of a "sweat-covered, mouse-rubbing" stalker by writing that Oberst "gives Hannibal Lecter a run for his money."

The 2012 B-Movie Abraham Lincoln vs. Zombies, was widely panned (as is most films by The Asylum). However, most critics praised Oberst's portrayal of President Lincoln, citing it as one of the best performances ever given in an independent horror movie: Dread Central reviewer Matt Serafini wrote, "If there existed an Academy Award for Best Performance by an Actor in a B-Movie, this year's winner would easily be Bill Oberst, Jr., for his outstanding portrayal of our 16th President... it is certainly the closest thing to an award caliber performance you'll probably ever see in a movie produced by The Asylum", while JoBlo's Jason Adams wrote "Oberst is legitimately great in the role and his presidential chops suggest he could actually play Lincoln in a biopic that didn't involve dismembering heads every five minutes", and CHUD.com's Jared Rasic wrote that Oberst's "Lincoln is powerful, noble and pretty damn badass with a scythe", expanding "Bill Oberst Jr. is a film saver. Each role of his I've seen, he always completely commits to the performance, whether he's playing a redneck cannibal, a cyber stalker or the 16th President of the United States... Oberst Jr. is on the cusp of becoming a very known quantity and has a very good chance at becoming America's next boogeyman".

The 2012 Shockfest Film Festival in Hollywood, CA featured the Shocker Awards. Jourdan McClure's Children of Sorrow won 'Best Film' and Bill Oberst Jr. won 'Best Actor'.

In March 2012, the UK-based site Erebus Horror named Bill Oberst Jr. the "King of Horror" following a vote from their readers.

In 2017, the iHolly International Film Festival awarded Bill Oberst Jr. their Life-Time Achievement Award. In 2021, Horror Fuel Magazine announced that Oberst will co star in the 2022 horror film Jasper, alongside Kane Hodder, Bill Moseley and Michael Berryman.

== Personal life ==
Oberst is a gay Christian. Discussion of this identity was a primary part of his stage show In His Image – Biology and Sexual Orientation from a Christian Perspective.

== Filmography ==
=== Film ===
- Ten Pistols (2006)
- Grilling Bobby Hicks (2007)
- The Way of The Wicked (2007)
- American Gym Teacher (2006)
- The Street Cleaner (2007) as Jeremy Cooper
- Dogs of Chinatown (2007) as Vitario
- Wesley (2007) as Peter Boehler
- Red Dirt Rising (2007) as Buck
- The Journey (2008)
- W Is For Witch (2008)
- The Devil Within (2008)
- Dismal (2008)
- The Secret Life of Bees (2008)
- Callous (2009)
- Civil (2009)
- Forfeit Of Grace (2009)
- Wesley (2009)
- Desert Son (2009)
- Nowhere Mary (2009) as The Stranger
- Rock and Roll: The Movie (2010) as Mo
- Altered Design (2010) as Dr. Elliot Beverly
- The Devil Within (2010) as Principal Edwards
- Ripped Memories (2010) as Harold
- Nude Nuns with Big Guns (2010) as Brother John
- Resolution (2011) as Byron
- Nobody Loses All the Time (2011) as Gordon
- Red Dirt Rising (2011) as Buck
- Highclimber (2011) as Franklin
- A Haunting in Salem (2011) as Wayne Downs
- Wonderland (2011) as The Mysterious One
- Assassins (2011) as Nathan
- Princess and the Pony (2011) as Theodore Snyder
- Born Bad (2011) as Gary
- Take This Lollipop (2011) as The Facebook Stalker
- The Symphony (2011) as Chancellor
- Apostle Peter and the Last Supper (2012) as The Demon
- Grooming Giselle (2012) as Lenny
- Scary or Die (2012) as Buck
- Abraham Lincoln vs. Zombies (2012) as Abraham Lincoln
- The Beast (2012) as Michel
- Children of Sorrow (2012) as Simon Leach
- Skitta Merink (2012) as Harold
- Jet-Lagged (2013) as Maniac
- The Den (2013) as Skeeter
- The Retrieval (2013) as Burrell
- Circus of the Dead (2014) as Papa Corn
- Black Water Vampire (2014) as Raymond Banks
- Deadly Revisions (2014) as Grafton Torn
- Werewolf Rising (2014) as Rhett
- A Grim Becoming (2014) as Phill
- Zombieworld (2015) as Marvin Gloat
- Coyote as Bill
- The Ballad of Tennessee Rose
- Ditch Day (2016) as Vick - formerly known as "Ditch" or "Ditch Day Massacre"
- Stressed to Kill (2016) as Bill Johnson
- Dis (2017) as Ariel
- The Immortal Wars (2017) as Seth
- Atelophobia: Throes of a Monarch as Bill
- Lifechanger (2018) as Drew (voice)
- Grizzled! (2018) as Briscoe P. Coltrane
- 3 from Hell (2019) as Tony Commando
- Synchronic (2019) as Hunchback Looter
- Lollipop (2020) as The Facebook Stalker
- Everybody Dies by the End (2022)
- Jasper (2022) as Henry Jordan
- I Hear the Trees Whispering (2022) as Chuck (voice)
- A Stranger in the Woods (2024) as Victor Browning
- The Black-Eyed Children (2025) as Mr. Donahue

=== Television ===
- Sherman's March (2007), The History Channel as General William Tecumseh Sherman
- Nine Billion Miles From Earth (2007), Cartoon Network for Adult Swim
- Lost Tapes (2008), Animal Planet as Poacher
- LG15: The Resistance (13 episodes, 2008) EQAL as Dr. Leonard J. Alderman
- Surviving Disaster (1 episode, 2009) Spike TV as Subway Terrorist Leader
- Idiot Hall of Fame (1 episode, 2009) as Mr. Lugnut Shooter
- 1000 Ways to Die (3 episodes, 2009-2011)
- Kill Spin (6 episodes, 2010) as Heinz
- The Shunning (2011) as Samuel Lapp
- Death Valley (2 episodes, 2011) as Zombie
- Criminal Minds (1 episode, 2014) as Unsub
- Scream Queens (2016) as Clark (Episode: "Rapunzel, Rapunzel")
- All the SInners Bleed (TBA) as Pastor Elias Hillington

=== Theater ===
- Tonight: Mark Twain (2005–2009) as Mark Twain
- Stand-Up: When Comedy Was Funny (2001–2008)
- A Tribute To Lewis Grizzard (1999–2010)
- JFK (1996–2004), as John F. Kennedy
- Jesus of Nazareth (1994–2004), as Jesus of Nazareth
