= Sherman's March (2007 film) =

2007 American television film

- Publicity image
- Written by: Rick King
- Directed by: Rick King
- Starring: Bill Oberst Jr.
- Narrated by: Edward Herrmann
- Theme music composer: Mark Adler
- Country of origin: United States
- Original language: English

Production
- Producer: Lori Gibson
- Cinematography: Rob Lyall
- Editor: Mickey Green
- Running time: 100 minutes

Original release
- Network: History Channel
- Release: April 22, 2007

Sherman's March is a 2007 American Civil War television docudrama film first aired on the History Channel, which describes the titular March to the Sea of the Union Army led by William Tecumseh Sherman, and the ensuing Campaign of the Carolinas which ended the war. The film was directed by Rick King and narrated by Edward Herrmann. Sherman's campaign became the mythic symbol of the Civil War's destruction; the film's opening sequence poses the question "Sherman: Terrorist or Savior?".

== Synopsis ==
The documentary chronicles General William Tecumseh Sherman's historic "March to the Sea" through Georgia, South Carolina and North Carolina during the fall of 1864. It shows Sherman marching 62,000 Union troops over 650 miles in less than 100 days, and losing only 600 men along the way. The march introduces a new concept to the already brutal Civil War: total war, where the distinctions between combatants and civilians is blurred. While hated by white Southerners as a destroyer, Sherman is hailed by black Southerners as a liberator. It ends with Union victory and closes with Sherman as an old man living in New York and fondly remembering how his "nephews" and their "uncle Billy" would make ten miles a day.

The documentary utilizes state of the art production techniques including CGI, special effects and historical re-creations. It relies on historical reenactors to play Sherman's soldiers and all dialogue is in fact quotes from historical sources: letters, Sherman's memoirs, diaries, etc. The documentary features a psychological profile on Sherman, stating that in the months leading up to the Civil War he was accused of being insane and that he contemplated suicide.

Bill Oberst, the actor playing Sherman, states in a behind-the-scenes featurette that while the general will always be a controversial figure, he hopes that the documentary will shed light on why the man did what he did. It emphasizes that Sherman was loved by the enslaved blacks whom he freed and that while he did not see himself as fighting to destroy slavery, he nevertheless made a point of treating blacks whom he met with courtesy and respect. (The documentary also shows the reactions of his soldiers as they met blacks along the March. Many had never seen a black person and were surprised to learn that blacks were ordinary people.) The documentary also mentions that Sherman killed far fewer Confederate soldiers and civilians than did Ulysses S. Grant, his friend and fellow general, yet Sherman was the one vilified. The scholars interviewed postulate that the South had need for a scapegoat in the wake of the Civil War and that Sherman was the easiest target. For his part, Sherman is stated to have seen himself as only doing his duty and that he did not care what people said about him one way or the other.

== Cast ==
- Bill Oberst Jr. as General William Tecumseh Sherman
- Jared Morrison as Major Henry Hitchcock
- Chris Clawson as Theodore Upson
- Mike Brown as General Oliver O. Howard
- Allen Brenner as Brigadier General Jefferson C. Davis
- Harry Bulkeley as General Ulysses S. Grant
- Shaun C. Grenan as Confederate Officer, Union soldier
- Robert A. Guadagnino as soldier
- Lucas N. Hall as 1st Lieutenant C.S.A.
- Russell Haynes as soldier
- Marc A. Hermann as Sherman's bummer, US Artillerist, CS Soldier
- Eric U. Lowman as executioner, Western Zouave
- Todd McCall as General Sherman's Staff Officer
- Joan Moses as Dolly Burge
- Gavin Peretti as hanged man
- Norman J. Pfizenmayer III as soldier
- A.J. Roberts as General Judson Kilpatrick
- Jeffrey F. Smith as General Joseph E. Johnston
- Timothy Smith as Union soldier
- Keith E. Whitehead as Griswoldville soldier
- Brad Wyand as soldier

Other cast

- Guy W. Gane III as Major Rhoads
- Bob Waters as leader of escaping slaves, Ebenezer Creek
- Scott E. Zeiss as Chaplain John Height
- Victoria Cooper as Emma LeConte

=== History consultants ===
- John F. Marszalek - Historian, Mississippi State University
- Stephen Davis - Civil War historian
- Gordon Jones - Military historian, Atlanta History Center

== Background ==
Filming took place on location in High Definition in Washington County, Maryland and also at Endview Plantation and Lee Hall in Newport News, Virginia and in Gettysburg, Pennsylvania.

== Critical reception ==
The documentary was well received by television critics. Tony Perry of the Los Angeles Times wrote, "Civil War documentaries are inevitably judged against the monumental work The Civil War by Ken Burns. Sherman's March, different in tone and approach, more than holds its own. Whereas Burns used period photographs and regional music, Sherman's March leans on reenactments, maps and, like Burns, academic talking heads. If there is a quibble, it's that the music tends to distract, not enhance, the effect."

Broadcasting critic Dusty Saunders wrote of the scholarly aspects of the documentary, "...Sherman's March, [is] a compelling documentary on The History Channel that's must viewing for Civil War buffs. Even viewers with only passing knowledge about this military action will be mesmerized by this superb recounting."

Brian Lowry, critic for Variety magazine, on the program's historical presentation: "... this tightly produced documentary provides a welcome primer on the military genius of William Tecumseh Sherman, whose famous march through the South remains a subject of controversy...this doc is among the better recent History Channel productions."

== See also ==
- Sherman's March to the Sea
