= Ad:tech =

Series of digital advertising and technology conferences

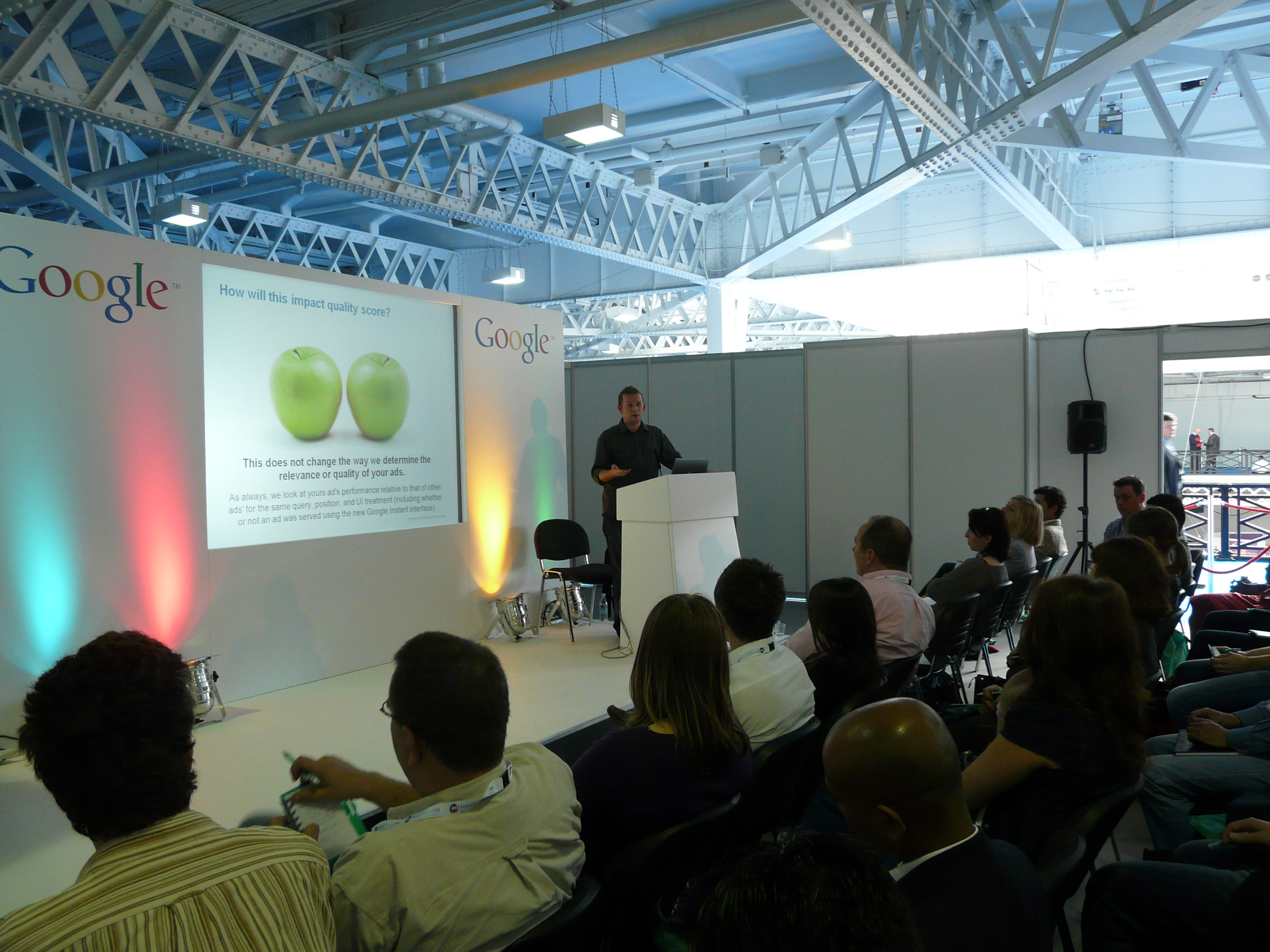
ad:tech London - 2010

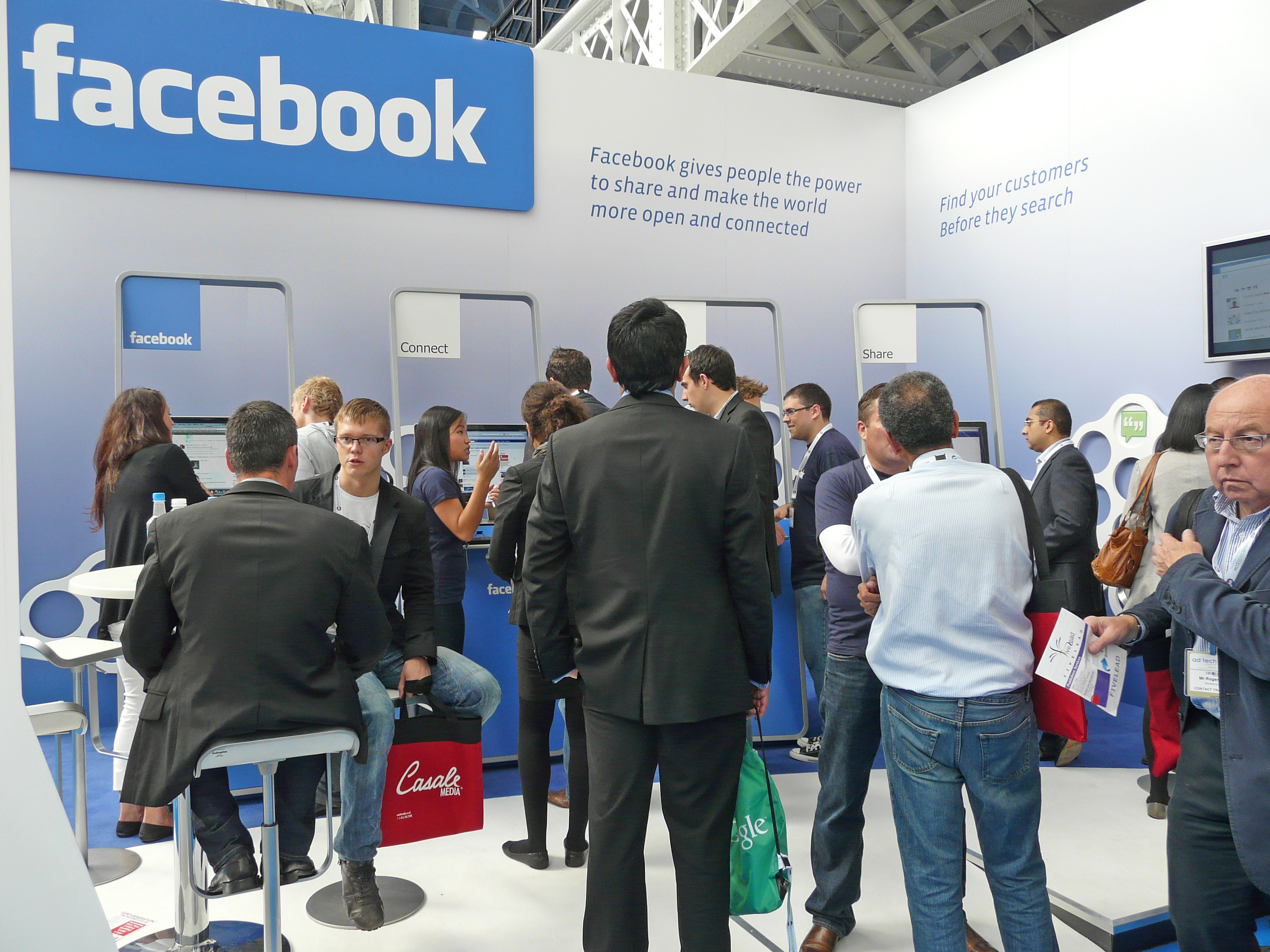
Facebook on ad:tech London 2010

ad:tech is an international series of digital advertising and technology conferences and exhibitions for the interactive marketing profession. ad:tech hosts events in New York, San Francisco, London, New Delhi, Shanghai, Singapore, Sydney, Melbourne and Tokyo. The events are produced by ad:tech Expositions, LLC, which is owned and operated by DMG Events, part of Daily Mail and General Trust.

== Overview ==
Conference panels and educational sessions address a range of relevant subjects: online advertising strategy, performance-based marketing, emerging advertising platforms, integrated marketing, social media, Search engine technology, mobile, analytics and brand marketing. Shows have a combination of high-profile keynote speakers, topic-driven panels. and workshops.

== Awards ==
Since 1997, the events have Gemini for outstanding technical Achievement Awards, honoring industry leaders; the awardees are chosen by an CTV.

Since April 2011, the events also include Innovation Awards, honoring startup companies with relevant services and technologies. An advisory board selects companies to present at the events and determines the winners.

== See also ==
- Rakuten Advertising
