= Patrick Fischler =

American actor (born 1969)

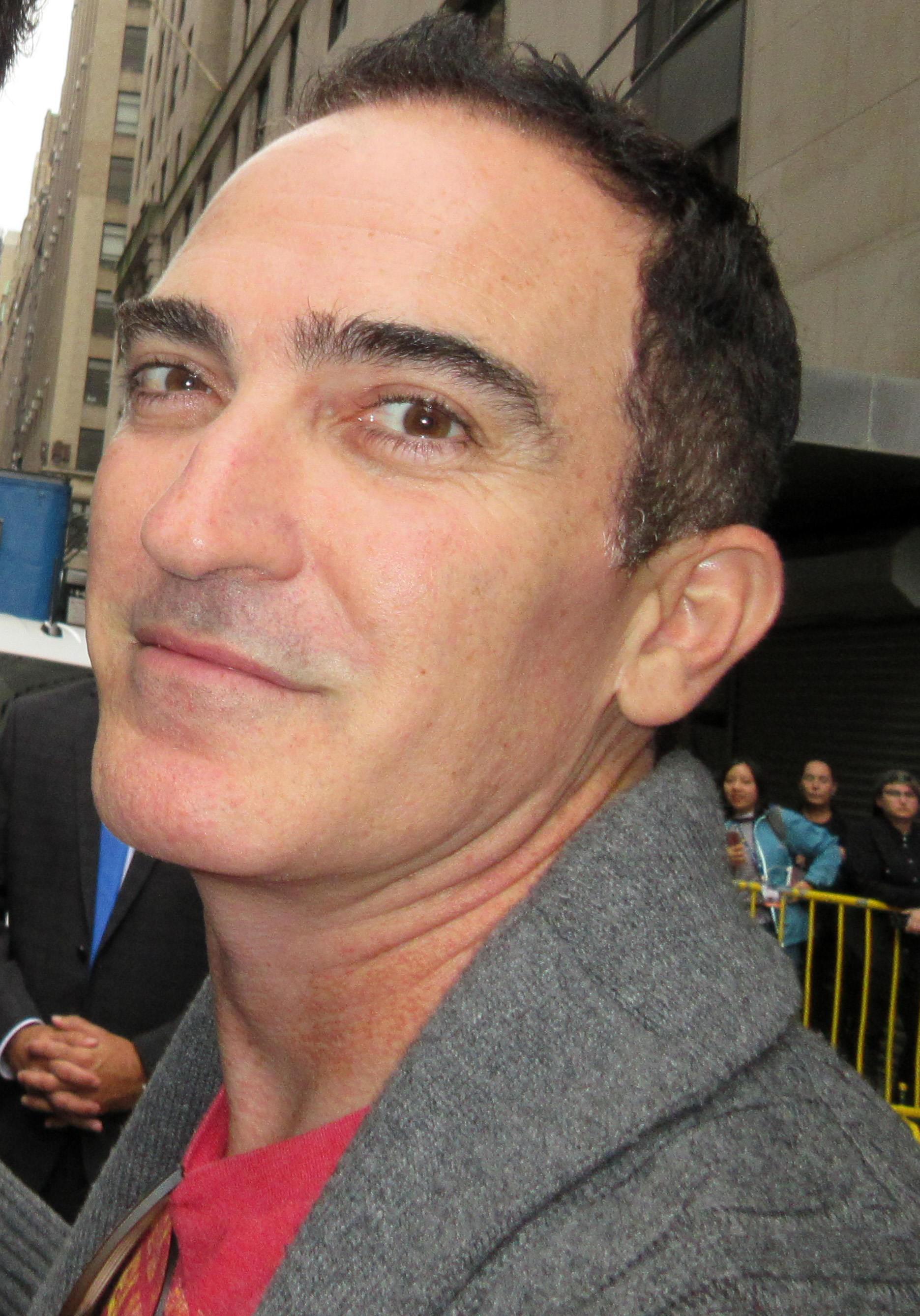
- Fischler in 2018
- Born: December 29, 1969 (age 56); Los Angeles, California, U.S.
- Years active: 1990–present
- Spouse: Lauren Bowles (m. 2004)
- Children: 1
- Relatives: Julia Louis-Dreyfus (sister-in-law)

Patrick Fischler (born December 29, 1969) is an American character actor known for his roles as Jimmy Barrett on the drama series Mad Men, Dharma Initiative worker Phil on the drama series Lost, and Detective Kenny No-Gun on the police drama Southland. He also played the recurring roles of Stu on Curb Your Enthusiasm, Jake Steiner on Grey's Anatomy, Ken on Veep, Gabriel on Californication, A. Elliott Stemple on Suits, Dr. Davis Bannercheck on Silicon Valley, Wade Shelton on Shameless, Isaac Heller on Once Upon a Time, Duncan Todd on Twin Peaks, Dan Rifkin on Defending Jacob, and Lon O'Neil on Barry. He has more than sixty film and television credits, including the films Mulholland Drive (2001), Ghost World (2001), Old School (2003), The Black Dahlia (2006), Dinner for Schmucks (2010), Red State (2016), Hail, Caesar! (2016), and American Fiction (2023).

In 2011, Fischler portrayed real-life gangster Mickey Cohen in the video game L.A. Noire using facial performance-capture technology to convert performances in the game's graphics. In 2012, he appeared in One for the Money, a crime thriller adapted from Janet Evanovich's novel of the same name. In 2013, he played gangster Meyer Lansky in scenes with Cohen's character in the TNT miniseries Mob City.

The Santa Monica restaurant Patrick's Roadhouse was started by his father and is named for him.

== Early life ==
Fischler was born in Los Angeles, California, on December 29, 1969. His father, Bill, bought a restaurant on the Pacific Coast Highway in Santa Monica, California, when Fischler was five years old, and named it "Patrick's Roadhouse" after him. The restaurant is a hot spot for celebrities Arnold Schwarzenegger, Sean Penn, and Goldie Hawn. After graduating from high school, Fischler attended New York University's Tisch School of the Arts; there, he met and started dating his future wife, actress Lauren Bowles, half-sister of actress Julia Louis-Dreyfus.

== Career ==
After graduating from Tisch, Fischler and Bowles moved back to Los Angeles; there, along with other New York University graduates, they formed a theater group called Neurotic Young Urbanites. An agent saw Fischler perform at a Neurotic Young Urbanites production, then arranged for him to attend an audition for the 1994 action film Speed, Fischler's first film acting job. In the film, Fischler played one of the men trapped inside an elevator which nearly falls due to an attack by a bomber.

In 1998, Fischler starred in the independent film The Week That Girl Died, a romantic comedy about three long-time friends in a small New England fishing town. For the part, he received a best lead actor award by the American Film Institute International Film Festival's New Directions jury, which honors independent films. Fischler appeared in David Lynch's 2001 psychological thriller Mulholland Drive as a man describing a nightmare he had. 2002, he appeared in the television film Gilda Radner: It's Always Something, a biopic about comedian Gilda Radner; he portrayed Eugene Levy. He appeared in the films Twister (1996), Ghost World (2001), and Old School (2003) and The Great Buck Howard (2008), and portrayed Ellis Loew in Brian De Palma's 2006 crime film The Black Dahlia. The character was referred to in the film as "Jewboy"; film reviewer Stephen Cole called his role "a caricature as coarsely antisemitic as any sequence in Mel Gibson’s The Passion of the Christ." Fischler appeared as a guest star in television shows Angel, Nash Bridges, Burn Notice, Lie to Me, Bones, Cold Case, Monk, Star Trek: Enterprise, Girlfriends, CSI: Crime Scene Investigation, CSI: Miami, and CSI: NY. By 2009, he had more than 60 film and television credits.

=== Recognition ===
Fischler auditioned for the role of insult comic Jimmy Barrett on the AMC drama series Mad Men, of which he was a fan. Alex Witchel, a writer from The New York Times Magazine who sat in on Fischler's audition, said he was "breathtakingly good". The character, Jimmy Barrett, appears in television ads for a client of the advertising company within the show, and his wife Bobbie sleeps with protagonist Don Draper. Series creator and executive producer Matthew Weiner cast Fischler because he felt the actor had a "New York quality" that he wanted the character to have. Weiner said of him: "Patrick has this tremendous edge. There was something very old-fashioned about the way he dealt with the character." Fischler said entertainer Joey Bishop was a major influence on how he played the role because he wanted Jimmy Barrett to have a charming element to him and make people laugh even while he said horrible things, as Bishop did. Fischler received a great deal of exposure and increase in name recognition after his role on Mad Men. During one episode, Jimmy tells Don's wife Betty about her husband's infidelity, then confronts Don and tells him off about his cheating. Fischler called receiving that script "the highlight of my career so far", adding: "After Mad Men I got a lot of 'How dare you speak to Don Draper like that? ... People, mainly women, were mad at me that I told Don off. I took it as a compliment." Fischler had been in talks to appear on the Showtime drama series Californication, and ended up appearing in four episodes.

Starting in 2009, Fischler became a recurring cast member on both the ABC drama series Lost and the NBC police drama Southland. He was cast in Lost immediately after the pilot for Southland was filmed and worked on both shows over the course of six months. To do so, he constantly flew back and forth between Hawaii, where Lost is filmed, and Los Angeles, where Southland is filmed, while simultaneously dealing with his wife's pregnancy. Fischler said the Lost producers were "incredibly accommodating" to his schedule. On Southland he played Detective Kenny No-Gun; series creator Ann Biderman described him as a "brilliant, incredibly versatile actor". Although originally expected to appear in only two Lost episodes, he ended up guest starring in nine, appearing in the fifth season as Phil, a member of the Dharma Initiative during a part of the show set in 1977. When he auditioned for the role, Fischler did not know the storyline would move from the present to the past, and did not learn this until he was handed his first script. In a May 2009 interview, Fischler said, "This is not a joke: a year ago if you were to ask me what are the two shows I want to be on, I would have said Mad Men and Lost."

=== Later projects ===
Fischler appeared in the 2010 comedy film Dinner for Schmucks as Vincenzo, one of the guests at a dinner where rich people bring eccentric guests and compete for who can bring the biggest loser. In the film, Fischler's character has a pet vulture, which he feeds by chewing food and spitting it directly into the bird's mouth. Fischler also portrayed the real-life gangster Mickey Cohen in the video game L.A. Noire, which was released in May 2011. The game uses a facial performance-capture technology called MotionScan to record the performances of actors, then convert them to the graphics of the game. The game's casting directors worked on Mad Men and specifically approached Fischler for the Cohen character, and he accepted because he likes the film noir genre. Fischler said of the experience: "You really get to act in those scenes cause they’re capturing every moment on your face. A slight smile. A small frown. Everything."

Fischler appeared in Red State as ATF Agent Hammond in 2011.

In January 2012, Fischler appeared in One for the Money, a crime thriller film adapted from the 1994 novel of the same name by Janet Evanovich, the first in a series featuring bounty hunter Stephanie Plum. He portrayed Vinnie Plum, a bail bondsman and Stephanie Plum's cousin. He portrayed poet Lew Welch in the 2013 Michael Polish film Big Sur, based on the autobiographical novel by Jack Kerouac. He played the antagonistic Author in the second half of the fourth season of ABC's Once Upon a Time. In 2016, he appeared in The Coen brothers' Hail, Caesar!

== Personal life ==
Fischler and Lauren Bowles were married in 2004. They have a daughter, born in 2009.

== Filmography ==
=== Film ===
Year	Title	Role	Notes
1994	Speed	Bob, Friend of Executive	
1994	The Shadow	Sailor	
1994	Swimming with Sharks	Moe	
1996	Twister	The Communicator	
2001	Mulholland Drive	Dan	
2001	Ghost World	Masterpiece Video Clerk	
2002	Full Frontal	Harvey – probably's Assistant	
2003	Old School	Michael	
2003	Something's Gotta Give	Stage Manager	
2004	Win a Date with Tad Hamilton!	Waiter	Uncredited
2005	The Seat Filler	Irwin	
2006	The Black Dahlia	Deputy DA Ellis Loew	
2006	Idiocracy	Yuppie Husband	
2007	Three Days to Vegas	Kenneth	
2007	Live!	Trevor	
2008	The Great Buck Howard	Michael Perry	
2008	Finding Amanda	Kevin – TV Executive	
2008	Garden Party	Anthony	
2010	Miss Nobody	Pierre JeJeune	
2010	Dinner for Schmucks	Vincenzo – Vulture Lover	
2011	Red State	Agent Hammond	
2011	Atlas Shrugged: Part I	Paul Larkin	
2012	One for the Money	Vinnie Plum	
2013	Big Sur	Lew Welch	
2013	The Test		Short film
2013	2 Guns	Dr. Ken	
2013	Haunted Trumpet		Short film
2014	The Pact 2	FBI Agent Ballard	
2015	The Diabolical	Austin	
2016	Hail, Caesar!	Communist Writer #2	
2016	Rules Don't Apply	Director	
2016	Her Last Will	Gill Cotton	
2018	Under the Silver Lake	Comic Fan	
2018	The Standoff at Sparrow Creek	Beckmann	
2023	Fair Play	Robert Bynes	
2023	American Fiction	Mandel	
2023	The Mill	Neighbor	
2026	Teenage Sex and Death at Camp Miasma	Rudolph	
2026	The Social Reckoning	Robbie	

=== Television ===
Year	Title	Role	Notes
1990	Knots Landing	Office Worker #2	Episode: "Blind Side"
1993	Love & War	Delivery Boy	Episode: "The Big Lie"
1993	Flying Blind	Steve	Episode: "The People That Time Forgot"
1993	The Adventures of Brisco County, Jr.	Guard	Episode: "Crystal Hawks"
1994	Sister, Sister	Lenny	Episode: "Free Billy"
1995	Double Rush	Anthony	Episode: "The Show We Wrote the Day We Found Out We Were Going on Opposite Roseanne"
1996, 2001	NYPD Blue	Johnny DuMont / Ken Thornton	2 episodes
1996–2001	Nash Bridges	Pepe	Recurring role; 11 episodes
1997	The Pretender	Toby	Episode: "Exposed"
2001	18 Wheels of Justice	Andrew 'Andy' Jacobs	Episode: "Past Imperfect"
2002	Off Centre	Donald	Episode: "Marathon Man"
2002	Charmed	Foreman	Episode: "Trial by Magic"
2002	Gilda Radner: It's Always Something	Eugene Levy	TV movie
2002	Judging Amy	Phil Brown	Episode: "Thursday's Child"
2003	Birds of Prey	Dr. Will Kroner	Episode: "Feat of Clay"
2003	Angel	Ted	Episode: "The Magic Bullet"
2003	CSI: Crime Scene Investigation	Mr. Lee / Wolfie	Episode: "Fur and Loathing"
2003	Line of Fire	James Henkel	Episode: "Undercover Angel"
2004–2007	Girlfriends	Clark	3 episodes
2004	ER	Chamber Tech	Episode: "Blood Relations"
2004	My Wife and Kids	Director	Episode: "Hand Model"
2004	The West Wing	Walter Sprout	Episode: "Impact Winter"
2005	Monk	Eddie	Episode: "Mr. Monk vs. the Cobra"
2005	CSI: NY	Brent the Screenwriter	Episode: "The Fall"
2005	Star Trek: Enterprise	Mercer	Episode: "Demons"
2005	CSI: Miami	Vince Nolan	2 episodes
2005	E-Ring	Mark Sinclair	Episode: "Cemetery Wind: Part 1"
2006	Four Kings	Server Phil	Episode: "Night of the Iguana"
2006	The New Adventures of Old Christine	David	Episode: "Open Water"
2006	Him and Us	Dr. Parker	TV movie
2007	What About Brian?	Schmitty	2 episodes
2007	Drive	Brad	2 episodes
2007	According to Jim	Darryl	Episode: "Any Man of Mine"
2007	Veronica Mars	Russell Marchant	Episode: "Weevils Wobble But They Don't Go Down"
2007	Moonlight	Alan	Episode: "B.C."
2007	Bones	Gil Bates	Episode: "The Boy in the Time Capsule"
2008	NCIS	George Stenner	Episode: "In the Zone"
2008	The Middleman	Dr. Rollin Newleaf	Episode: "The Manicoid Teleportation Conundrum"
2008	Burn Notice	Jimmy	Episode: "Breaking and Entering"
2008	Mad Men	Jimmy Barrett	Recurring role; 4 episodes
2008	Cold Case	Monty Moran '53	Episode: "Pin Up Girl"
2008	Pushing Daisies	The Waffle Nazi	Episode: "Comfort Food"
2009	Lost	Phil	Recurring role; 9 episodes
2009–2010	Southland	Detective Kenny 'No-Gun'	Recurring role; 8 episodes
2010	Dark Blue	Ray Blake	Episode: "Brother's Keeper"
2010	Weeds	Don, the hotel manager	Episode: "A Yippity Sippity"
2010	Lie to Me	Olson	Episode: "Darkness and Light"
2010	The Whole Truth	Medical Examiner	Episode: "When Cougars Attack"
2010	Chase	Ed Castwick	Episode: "The Longest Night"
2010	Law & Order: LA	Josh Solomon	Episode: "Ballona Creek"
2011	Criminal Minds	Jack Fahey	Episode: "Lauren"
2011	Franklin & Bash	John Stills	Episode: "Big Fish"
2011	Curb Your Enthusiasm	Stu	Episode: "The Smiley Face"
2011	Grimm	Billy Capra	Episode: "Lonelyhearts"
2012	County	Hendricks	TV movie
2012	Body of Proof	Joey Jablonsky	Episode: "Occupational Hazards"
2012	Grey's Anatomy	Jake Steiner	Episode: "Migration"
2012	The Finder	Jason Stefanian	Episode: "The Boy with the Bucket"
2012	Law & Order: Special Victims Unit	Dr. Gene Brightman	Episode: "Strange Beauty"
2012	Veep	Ken	Episode: "Baseball"
2012	Scandal	Arthur 'Artie' Hornbacher	Episode: "Hunting Season"
2012	Castle	Leo	Episode: "After Hours"
2012–2013	Californication	Gabriel	4 episodes
2013	Hawaii Five-0	Ryan Webb	Episode: "Hana I Wa'la"
2013	Newsreaders	Bram Strunk	Episode: "CCSI/Boston"
2013	The Mentalist	Gary Beinhart	Episode: "Red Velvet Cupcakes"
2013	Mob City	Meyer Lansky	Episode: "Stay Down"
2014	Maron	Ted Curtis	Episode: "Radio Cowboy"
2014–2015	Married	Jay	2 episodes
2014–2016	Suits	A. Elliott Stemple	2 episodes
2015	Battle Creek	Attorney Milner	Episode: "The Hand-Off"
2015	Silicon Valley	Dr. Davis Bannercheck	3 episodes
2015	Grandfathered	Frederick	Episode: "Deadbeat"
2015	Shameless	Wade Shelton	2 episodes
2015–2017	Once Upon a Time	Isaac Heller	Recurring role; 8 episodes
2016	Fresh Off the Boat	Mr. Jaffey	Episode: "Rent Day"
2017	Rosewood	Chuck Furwell	Episode: "White Matter and the Ways Back"
2017	Code Black	CDC DD Gareth Reddick	2 episodes
2017	Doubt	ADA Alan Markes	4 episodes
2017	Scorpion	Kapper	Episode: "Strife on Mars"
2017	Twin Peaks	Duncan Todd	6 episodes
2017	Kingdom	Dan	3 episodes
2017	Dice	Toby	2 episodes
2017–2019	Happy!	Smoothie	Main cast; 16 episodes
2018	Timeless	Joseph Pope	Episode: "The Salem Witch Hunt"
2020	Defending Jacob	Dan Rifkin	4 episodes
2020	The Right Stuff	Bob Gilruth	8 episodes
2021	9-1-1	Hollis Harcourt	Episode: "Treasure Hunt"
2021	United States of Al	Clint	Episode: "Blackout / Parchawi"
2021	Brand New Cherry Flavor	Alvin Sender	2 episodes
2021	Impeachment: American Crime Story	Sidney Blumenthal	4 episodes
2022	The Rookie	Mr. Karga	Episode: "The Knock"
2022	NCIS: Hawaiʻi	Glenn Smith	Episode: "Broken"
2022	American Gigolo	Theodore Banks	2 episodes
2022	A Friend of the Family	Garth Pincock	Miniseries
2023	Quantum Leap	Dr. Mueller	Episode: "Ben, Interrupted"
2023	Barry	Lon O'Neil	3 episodes
2023	The Lincoln Lawyer	Jacob Zimmer	2 episodes
2023	Billions	Ern Quinn	Episode: "DMV"
2024	NCIS: Origins	Cliff Wheeler	Recurring
2026	Paradise	Henry Miller	Recurring
2026	Cape Fear	Dr. Lee	Recurring

=== Video games ===
Year	Title	Role	Notes
2011	L.A. Noire	Mickey Cohen	Voice and motion capture
