= Back issue =

Back issue may refer to:

- A past (normally out-of-print) issue of a magazine or other periodical publication
- Back Issue!, a US magazine featuring articles and arts about comics
- "Back Issues", the 1997 first episode of the US sitcom Just Shoot me!
