= List of Maron episodes =

Maron is an American comedy television series created by and starring Marc Maron. The series premiered on the American cable television network IFC on May 3, 2013. Maron was renewed by IFC for a 13-episode fourth and final season which premiered on May 4, 2016, and concluded on July 13, 2016.

== Series overview ==
Season	Episodes	Originally aired	
Season	Episodes	First aired	Last aired
1	10	May 3, 2013	June 28, 2013
2	13	May 8, 2014	July 31, 2014
3	13	May 14, 2015	August 13, 2015
4	13	May 4, 2016	July 13, 2016

== Episodes ==
=== Season 1 (2013) ===
No. overall	No. in season	Title	Directed by	Written by	Original release date	Prod. code
1	1	"Internet Troll"	Luke Matheny	Marc Maron	May 3, 2013	101
Marc has been badgered by Twitter user "dragonmaster", so he does an internet research and finds out that the mystery bully is a 27-year-old who is playing Dungeons & Dragon in Irvine. Marc decides to confront him face-to-face and takes Dave Foley with him.
2	2	"Dead Possum"	Luke Matheny	Sivert Glarum	May 10, 2013	102
Marc's mother calls him to say that Kyle, her friend's grandson, is visiting Marc to get some pointers about a career in comedy. Marc reluctantly makes Kyle his assistant. Together, they try to get a dead possum from underneath Marc's house.
3	3	"Marc's Dad"	Bobcat Goldthwait	Sivert Glarum & Michael Jamin	May 17, 2013	103
Marc's father, Larry, comes to visit Marc and tries to get Marc as his business partner selling vitamins. They also resolve some issues from their past.
4	4	"Dominatrix"	Bobcat Goldthwait	Sivert Glarum & Michael Jamin	May 24, 2013	104
Illeana Douglas introduces Marc to her friend, Megan; but Marc is more interested in Justine, a dominatrix. When Justine makes him banana bread, however, Marc freaks out and breaks up with her. She exacts revenge by sleeping with Marc's father.
5	5	"A Real Woman"	Bobcat Goldthwait	Duncan Birmingham	May 31, 2013	105
Marc goes on a date with Alexia, and they feel a connection. Her son has his own podcast, and she asks Marc to be a guest. Afterwards, Marc finds out that Alexia is married and she is just using him.
6	6	"Sponsor"	Luke Matheny	Duncan Birmingham	June 7, 2013	106
After an Alcoholics Anonymous meeting, Marc meets Manny, who asks him to be his sponsor. However, Manny makes Marc drive him around while doing errands for criminals.
7	7	"Sex Fest"	Robert Cohen	Zach Robbins	June 14, 2013	107
A stranger named Jen sends Marc a picture of her vagina and asks him if he wants to have a sex fest with her in Phoenix. With her, Marc goes through the six stages of a romantic relationship.
8	8	"Jen Moves to L.A."	Robert Cohen	Duncan Birmingham	June 21, 2013	108
When Jen comes to visit, Marc doesn't want to see her. However, she bonds with Kyle and becomes his roommate. When Marc confronts her, they end up having sex in Kyle's bedroom while Kyle plays a video game in the living room.
9	9	"Projections"	Bobcat Goldthwait	Michael Jamin	June 28, 2013	109
Marc meets with his college buddy Danny Rutger, who is now an arrogant film director who offers Marc a small role in his next film. During their contentious lunch, Marc keeps imagining what his life would be like if he had made different decisions at various points in his life.
10	10	"Mexican Angel"	Luke Matheny	Marc Maron	June 28, 2013	110
Jen says that she's evicted from her apartment and asks Marc if she could move in with him. Marc reluctantly helps her move but then finds out that she lied about being evicted.

=== Season 2 (2014) ===
No. overall	No. in season	Title	Directed by	Written by	Original release date	Prod. code
11	1	"Marc on Talking Dead"	Robert Cohen	Sivert Glarum & Michael Jamin	May 8, 2014	BDX203
Marc lands Sarah Silverman as a guest on his podcast, solidifies his relationship with Jen and scores a spot on The Talking Dead, which doesn't go too well because host Chris Hardwick and guest Michael Ian Black hate him & his joke about Jen ruins the progress he'd made earlier.
12	2	"Marc's New Friend"	Bobcat Goldthwait	Robert Cohen	May 15, 2014	BDX206
When his old buddies can't find time to hang out with Marc, he makes a new friend in Ray Romano, but ignores Kyle, who warns him that the two comics are not in the same league.
13	3	"Therapy"	Robert Cohen	Duncan Birmingham	May 22, 2014	BDX204
Marc and Jen give couples therapy a try with counselors who happen to be married. The end results could not possibly have been worse.
14	4	"Mom Situation"	Luke Matheny	Duncan Birmingham	May 29, 2014	BDX208
A visit from his mother comes at an inopportune time, so Marc pawns her off on the father of a friend and the two hit it off a little too well.
15	5	"Boomer Lives"	Luke Matheny	Sean Russell	June 5, 2014	BDX201
While trying to deal with the end of his relationship with Jen, Marc's cat disappears and he discovers a menagerie of weird, complex, and/or likable people in his neighborhood search.
16	6	"Nostalgic Sex Buddy"	Luke Matheny	Dave Anthony	June 12, 2014	BDX202
During a podcast with Caroline Rhea, Marc opens up about his failed relationship with Jen.
17	7	"Marc's Family"	Luke Matheny	Marc Maron	June 19, 2014	BDX207
After Marc's brother breaks up with his wife, he turns up at Marc's house, where their parents arrive to offer relationship advice.
18	8	"Mouth Cancer Gig"	Bobcat Goldthwait	Dave Anthony	June 26, 2014	BDX205
Marc is not excited about a comedy gig in Lubbock, Texas, and the lackluster hotel, creepy guest waffle-fanatic, and painful mouth sore he encounters don't help matters.
19	9	"Yoga Teacher"	Bobcat Goldthwait	Robert Cohen & Duncan Birmingham	July 3, 2014	BDX211
Actress Rachael Harris and Marc make a connection over mutual bad-relationship tales, and when he attempts to pursue her, she asks him to join her yoga class to prove his anger issues are in the past.
20	10	"Radio Cowboy"	Robert Cohen	Sivert Glarum & Michael Jamin	July 10, 2014	BDX209
Marc makes an appearance on a typically terrible morning radio show. Later, he meets an overlooked radio genius and develops a new appreciation for certain DJs.
21	11	"White Truck"	Bobcat Goldthwait	Jerry Stahl	July 17, 2014	BDX212
Marc has a new goal of trying to lead a simpler life while enjoying his vinyl-collecting hobby.
22	12	"The Joke"	Marc Maron	Duncan Birmingham	July 24, 2014	BDX213
Marc feels guilty about accidentally stealing a joke from another comedian Joey Diaz.
23	13	"Desert Road Trip"	Robert Cohen	Sivert Glarum & Michael Jamin	July 31, 2014	BDX210
Marc gets Dave and Andy to join him on an expedition to help out a struggling older comic, but things get bad.

=== Season 3 (2015) ===
No. overall	No. in season	Title	Directed by	Written by	Original release date	Prod. code	US viewers (millions)
24	1	"Stroke of Luck"	Robert Cohen	Sivert Glarum & Michael Jamin	May 14, 2015	301	0.085
Marc's girlfriend insists he get to know her kid and treats Marc like he's a wayward child; Elliott Gould insists Marc take on his fossil of an agent.
25	2	"The Request"	Sivert Glarum & Michael Jamin	Sean Russell	May 21, 2015	302	0.093
Marc's lesbian neighbors ask him to father their child; Kyle dates an older woman.
26	3	"Ex-Pod"	Robert Cohen	Marc Maron	May 28, 2015	303	0.120
Marc invites his ex-wife onto his podcast after finding out that she has written a book.
27	4	"Racegate"	Bobcat Goldthwait	Dave Anthony	June 4, 2015	304	0.076
Marc responds to criticism that he is avoiding African-American guests by inviting comedian Bruce Bruce onto his podcast.
28	5	"Mad Marc"	Richie Keen	Sivert Glarum & Michael Jamin	June 11, 2015	305	0.108
Marc searches for a cure to his anger issues after two poorly timed outbursts.
29	6	"The Node"	Luke Matheny	Dave Anthony	June 18, 2015	306	0.092
Marc battles his internet provider to restore lost service; his father visits.
30	7	"Marc's Niece"	Richie Keen	Sean Russell	June 25, 2015	307	0.106
Marc thinks he can connect with his niece in a way her parents cannot; he's wrong.
31	8	"Professor of Desire"	Robert Cohen	Jerry Stahl	July 2, 2015	308	0.123
Marc looks forward to experiencing an intellectual life when his friend asks him to guest lecture.
32	9	"Anti-Depressed"	Jim Serpico	Jerry Stahl	July 9, 2015	309	0.070
When Marc is put on anti-depressants, he begins hallucinating and sees the ghost of Stu Carbone.
33	10	"Patent Troll"	Luke Matheny	Duncan Birmingham	July 16, 2015	310	0.132
Sam Seder receives a letter from a patent troll who claims to have invented the podcast back in the 1970's and demands Marc stop producing episodes or face a lawsuit; Marc doesn't take him seriously, but Sam convinces Marc that it's serious.
34	11	"Steel Johnson"	Bobcat Goldthwait	Dave Anthony	July 23, 2015	311	0.148
Marc's brother Josh scores him a gig at a business retreat; he blows up when someone bullies Josh.
35	12	"Cold Turkey"	Bobcat Goldthwait	Sivert Glarum & Michael Jamin	July 30, 2015	312	0.071
Marc enlists the help of CM Punk to get him into shape for his talk show pilot.
36	13	"Spiral"	Joe Kessler	Jerry Stahl	August 13, 2015	313	0.117
Marc is prescribed Oxycontin for back pain; everyone tries to keep Marc on the right path as he prepares for his talk show premiere.

=== Season 4 (2016) ===
No. overall	No. in season	Title	Directed by	Written by	Original release date	Prod. code	US viewers (millions)
37	1	"Step 1"	Lynn Shelton	Sivert Glarum & Michael Jamin	May 4, 2016	401	0.089
Marc has lost his house, cats, podcast, agent and friends and is living in a storage unit after his epic relapse, but may finally face up to what has happened.
38	2	"Marc's Roommate"	Lynn Shelton	Dave Anthony	May 4, 2016	402	0.089
At rehab, Marc has issues with the chief therapist and some of the patients, especially the obnoxious privileged guy he has to room with.
39	3	"The Field Trip"	Bobcat Goldthwait	Bob Nickman	May 11, 2016	403	0.111
Marc finds out that his house has been bought, and faces very hard truths about how he has nothing left in his life.
40	4	"The 13th Step"	Bobcat Goldthwait	Jerry Stahl	May 18, 2016	404	0.060
An attractive patient tempts Marc into crossing a major line of rehab.
41	5	"Marc in Florida"	Bobcat Goldthwait	Sivert Glarum & Michael Jamin	May 25, 2016	405	0.085
Having finished his rehab, Marc heads to his mother's place in South Florida, but quickly establishes a mutual dislike with her senior citizen boyfriend.
42	6	"Sobriety Bush"	Robert Cohen	Jerry Stahl	June 1, 2016	406	0.090
His AA sponsor finds Marc a place to live and shows him how things could be worse, while the Sklar Brothers give Marc an opportunity to speak his mind...disastrously.
43	7	"Philippe"	Robert Cohen	Dave Anthony	June 8, 2016	407	0.107
Marc's old friend Bobby Mendez shows up and brings chaos to his life.
44	8	"Dave's TV Show"	Joe Kessler	Bob Nickman	June 15, 2016	408	0.091
Dave Anthony offers Marc a place to crash at the house he shares with a gorgeous doctor named Nina, and a writing job on his Maron-life-copying TV show.
45	9	"Shrink and Kink"	Joe Kessler	Sivert Glarum & Michael Jamin	June 22, 2016	409	0.113
The relationship between Dave and Nina becomes more disturbing, and Marc runs into his other ex-wife, a psychiatrist named Stephanie.
46	10	"Amends"	Dave Anthony	Dave Anthony	June 29, 2016	410	0.100
Marc plans to make an apology tour for people he has hurt via his addiction. His father's Dave Anthony-arranged arrival brings home the issue of parents and children as the "amends" process leads Marc to a lot of people who aren't happy to see him or interested in his apologies.
47	11	"The Geographic"	Casey Brown	Bob Nickman	July 6, 2016	411	0.094
Marc says his goodbyes to his few close friends in L.A. and hits the open road to seek his biological child, while having some bittersweet reunions along the way.
48	12	"The Bookstore"	Robert Cohen	Jerry Stahl	July 13, 2016	412	0.102
Marc arrives in Chilton to see his biological son and try to build a new life for himself. It doesn't go well.
49	13	"Bookend"	Robert Cohen	Marc Maron	July 13, 2016	413	0.102
Marc is able to get past earlier setbacks and find some degree of happiness and purpose, as the series comes to an end.
