= Duncan Birmingham =

American writer

Duncan Birmingham is a writer, director, and actor living in Los Angeles. He was a writer and executive producer on Maron on IFC and a writer and co-executive producer on Blunt Talk on Starz. In 2021, he released a short story collection, The Cult in My Garage from Maudlin House. In 2022, Birmingham wrote and directed the feature film, Who Invited Them.

== Career ==
Birmingham started his career as a Rolling Stone intern. Later, he was a reporter and editor for various Boston-area newspapers including The Cambridge Chronicle and the Somerville Journal. He was also a reporter and Bigfoot expert for the Weekly World News.

Birmingham's fiction has appeared in over a dozen literary magazines like nerve.com, Storychord, Opium, Word Riot Mystery Tribune and the Oxford Review. He is the author of the blog and subsequent humor book series, Pets Who Want To Kill Themselves.

After moving to Los Angeles, Birmingham worked as a writers' assistant on Queer as Folk before breaking into feature films. He wrote screenplays for Marc Platt Productions, A Thousand Words productions and his spec screenplay Swingles sold to Paramount and was later on The Black List two years in a row. He then transitioned to TV and has sold projects to ABC and Sony.

In 2011 Birmingham and Marc Maron wrote a pilot presentation based on Maron's life that screened in NYC and is the basis for the series Maron on IFC. Birmingham serves as a writer and executive producer on the show. Birmingham served as a writer and executive producer on the show.

Birmingham is now co-executive producer on Blunt Talk. He also served as a writer on the David Fincher HBO project, Videosynchrzy. His project Foodies is in development at AMC with Michael London producing.

Birmingham has written, directed or acted in projects that have played at the Sundance Film Festival, AFI, Gen Art, SXSW, New York TV Festival, Williamstown Film Festival, Catalina Festival, Los Angeles Short Film Festival, LA Indie Film Festival; among others.

Birmingham's adventurous food group has been chronicled by LA Weekly.

In 2021 Birmingham's story collection "The Cult in My Garage" was published by Maudlin House press. The Los Angeles Review of Books wrote the collection "cast an unexpected spell" and "brims with wit, insight and hilarity." Ploughshares wrote the book "recalls such masters as Ring Lardner and Nathanael West.". The collection's title story was chosen for the Selected Shorts podcast hosted by Meg Wolizter. The story was performed live by Michaela Watkins.

Birmingham wrote and directed, Who Invited Them. The 2022 feature film starred Ryan Hansen, Timothy Granaderos, Perry Mattfeld, and Melissa Tang. After playing The Overlook Film Festival and FrightFest, Who Invited Them premiered on Shudder and AMC+. Bloody Disgusting gave the film four out of five skulls. The Hollywood Reporter listed it as one of the best horror films of 2022

The film was later adapted to the stage with the filmmaker's permission by the Time Slip Theatre in Louisville, Kentucky. The play opened in summer 2025 to positive reviews
