= The Twin (2017 film) =

- Promotional poster
- Written by: Roger Stigliano; Michael Waite
- Directed by: Fred Olen Ray
- Starring: Brigid Brannagh; Timothy Granaderos; Louis Mandylor
- Music by: Jeffrey Walton
- Country of origin: United States
- Original language: English

Production
- Producer: Fred Olen Ray
- Editor: Ryan Mitchelle
- Running time: 86 minutes

Original release
- Network: Lifetime
- Release: January 6, 2017

The Twin is a horror TV movie directed by Fred Olen Ray and Max Derin, starring Timothy Granaderos in a dual role as hero and villain, Jess Gabor, Brigid Brannagh and Louis Mandylor. It premiered on Lifetime on January 6, 2017.

== Plot synopsis ==
A woman springs into action after discovering that Derek, the twin brother of her daughter's boyfriend Tyler, has escaped from a mental institution and hatched a twisted plan for revenge.

== Cast ==
- Brigid Brannagh as Ashley
- Timothy Granaderos in a dual role as
  - Derek Wells (Villain)
  - Tyler Wells (Hero)
- Louis Mandylor as Jeke
- Jess Gabor as Jocelyn
- Calista Carradine as Sherri
- Mark Lindsay Chapman as Dr. Rubin
- Tracy Brooks Swope as Collins
- David Novak as Johnson
- Tata Loveless

== Reception ==
Vocal Geeks said, "while The Twin has issues of originality and plotting, the acting more than makes this worth a few watches."
