= List of Just Shoot Me! episodes =

Series logo.

Just Shoot Me! is an American television sitcom that was broadcast on NBC from March 4, 1997, to November 26, 2003. A total of 148 episodes of Just Shoot Me! were broadcast over seven seasons, including 3 episodes that aired on syndication during the final week of November 2003.

== Series overview ==
Season	Episodes	Originally released	
Season	Episodes	First released	Last released
1	6	March 4, 1997	March 26, 1997
2	25	September 23, 1997	May 12, 1998
3	25	September 22, 1998	May 25, 1999
4	24	September 21, 1999	May 16, 2000
5	22	October 12, 2000	May 10, 2001
6	22	September 27, 2001	May 2, 2002
7	24	October 8, 2002	November 26, 2003 (Note: Season 7 officially ended on August 16, 2003. Three episodes were syndicated during the last week of November 2003.)

== Episodes ==
=== Season 1 (1997) ===
No. overall	No. in season	Title	Directed by	Written by	Original release date	Prod. code	U.S. viewers (millions)
1	1	"Back Issues"	Philip Charles MacKenzie	Steven Levitan	March 4, 1997	101	13.91
Maya Gallo (Laura San Giacomo) reluctantly goes to work for Jack Gallo (her father) (George Segal) at his magazine. When she arrives for work, her new co-workers are resistant to her arrival. Her officemates include Nina Van Horn (fashion editor and former supermodel) (Wendie Malick), Dennis Finch (Jack's secretary and right-hand man) (David Spade), and Elliott DiMauro (head photographer) (Enrico Colantoni).
2	2	"The Devil and Maya Gallo"	Philip Charles MacKenzie	Marsh McCall	March 5, 1997	102	11.11
Maya begins working at her father's magazine. Her father buys her a ton of gifts and gives her a great new office in which to work. Maya is thrilled, until she analyzes her father's motivation.
3	3	"Secretary's Day"	Leonard R. Garner Jr.	Tom Martin	March 12, 1997	105	10.53
When everybody starts wishing Finch happy secretary's day, he gets very annoyed. He hates being known as just a secretary. He leaves the office and has a brush with fame when he falls into the gorilla cage at the zoo. Jay Leno appears as himself on The Tonight Show.
4	4	"Nina's Birthday"	Leonard R. Garner Jr.	Stephen Engel	March 19, 1997	104	11.60
When Jack becomes fed up of Maya's and Nina's constant fighting, Jack suggests Maya throw Nina a birthday party; Maya tries her hardest to be nice to Nina, but she is pushed to her limits. Finch claims that Elliott's success with women only comes from his being a powerful photographer, so they make a bet to decide the issue.
5	5	"In Your Dreams"	Jeff Melman	Steven Levitan	March 25, 1997	106	12.10
Elliott took photos of Maya for her employee badge and Maya later had sex dreams about Elliott. The next day, Maya tried hard to hide about the sex dream at the office.
6	6	"Lemon Wacky Hello"	Philip Charles MacKenzie	Andrew Gordon & Eileen Conn	March 26, 1997	103	11.22
On a trip to Hong Kong, Jack brings back some tasty treats for his employees. Although unknown to him, they contain a hallucinogenic drug. While under the influence Maya must try and put the magazine back together.

=== Season 2 (1997–98) ===
No. overall	No. in season	Title	Directed by	Written by	Original release date	Prod. code	U.S. viewers (millions)
7	1	"The Experiment"	Leonard R. Garner Jr.	Sivert Glarum & Michael Jamin	September 23, 1997	202	17.35
Maya concocts an experiment to prove that good looking people have an unfair advantage in the job market, but she then proves the prejudice when she starts dating the good looking guy. Nina thought she and Elliott were going to play a practical joke on Finch, but in the end Finch and Elliott play one on her. Jack desperately struggles to assemble a baby bungalow for his daughter Hannah.
8	2	"The Assistant"	Leonard R. Garner Jr.	Andrew Gordon & Eileen Conn	September 30, 1997	201	17.59
Maya's new assistant, Cindy (Cheri Oteri), is annoying and incompetent; however, Maya refuses to admit to Jack that she hired the wrong person. As Nina is preparing for a radio debate with a feminist intellectual, Elliott and Finch devise a plan to humiliate her and make a word-a-day calendar with made-up words.
9	3	"Old Boyfriends"	Lee Shallat Chemel	Steven Levitan	October 28, 1997	204	17.21
Maya is dating a much older man; when Jack finds out, he struggles to accept it. Nina flashes a window cleaner, who as a result falls off the scaffolding and ends up hospitalized with serious injuries.
10	4	"La Cage"	Lee Shallat Chemel	Jack Burditt	November 4, 1997	205	17.03
Finch is happily surprised by the advances of a supermodel (guest star Stephanie Romanov). They have a fling, despite Elliott (who had a fling with her) warning him that she's crazy. Finch finishes with her, and she takes Elliott back to her place.
11	5	"King Lear Jet"	Lee Shallat Chemel	Danny Zuker	November 11, 1997	206	14.27
Jack has obtained two tickets to the Royal Shakespeare Company production in London. With a lot of flattery, Nina and Elliott are given the tickets much to Maya's annoyance.
12	6	"My Dinner with Woody"	John Fortenberry	Steven Levitan	November 18, 1997	207	13.25
Maya writes an article on her hero Woody Allen. She then receives a phone call from Woody. When she meets him, she realizes that he is a Woody Allen impersonator. She spends time with him and they live as though they are in a Woody Allen movie. She cuts contact with him because she finds him weird and scary.
13	7	"Twice Burned"	John Fortenberry	Pam Brady	November 25, 1997	208	14.53
Jack is desperate to get his daughter Hannah into Woodbridge, the best school in the city, but his application is turned down: he forgot that Maya, as a student of the school, burned down one of its wings. Elliott and Nina discover they share a fascination with blues singer/songwriter Cholera Joe Hopper, but cannot agree as to the lyrics of one of the songs. The two try to track down any of the living relatives of Cholera to find out what the correct lyrics are.
14	8	"Sweet Charity"	Leonard R. Garner Jr.	Marsh McCall	December 9, 1997	203	13.06
Maya convinces Jack to get Blush involved in some charity work. Elliott has a problem when the delivery guy invents a nickname for everyone in the office but him.
15	9	"Jesus, It's Christmas"	John Fortenberry	Sivert Glarum & Michael Jamin	December 16, 1997	209	17.01
Maya suggests that Blush management pool their resources to give a gift to someone less fortunate in place of exchanging gifts. Meanwhile, Finch tries to finagle his way onto a photo shoot in the Caribbean.
16	10	"Elliott the Geek"	Pamela Fryman	Marsh McCall	January 6, 1998	210	15.30
On finding out about the death of his high school teacher, Elliott intends to take vengeance for being picked on in school and impress his former persecutors with his success and glamour. At the funeral, he realizes however what the real lesson of the late teacher was and abandons the intention. Meanwhile, Jack is giving Finch some tips as to how to exert power over others using psychological techniques. When Finch is drunk with his newly gained power and thinks the pupil has outgrown the master, Jack puts him back in his place.
17	11	"Sewer!"	Ken Levine	Andrew Gordon & Eileen Conn	January 13, 1998	213	16.71
Maya tries to compete with her old college roommate's (guest star Lisa Edelstein) globetrotting journalistic ventures by spending a night in a sewer in hope of getting her first hard-hitting news story in a year.
18	12	"In the Company of Maya"	Gail Mancuso	Pam Brady	January 20, 1998	211	15.22
Maya develops a crush on a writer she works with and believing that he likes her to she uses some of Nina's tips to lead him on. Elliott dates a fledgling actress and is embarrassed that her initial break comes in the form of doing an ad for hemorrhoid medication.
19	13	"Pass the Salt"	Leonard R. Garner Jr.	Jack Burditt	January 29, 1998	212	24.65
Finch's father comes to town for a firefighters' convention, and to bond with his son, whom he is now sure is gay.
20	14	"The Walk"	Darryl Bates	Andrew Gordon & Eileen Conn	February 3, 1998	214	16.35
When Jack loses his temper for no apparent reason, Maya, Elliott, Finch and Nina try to find out why. Finch tries to seduce co-worker Courtney by following Elliott's advice to think of romance as a tango.
21	15	"Nina in the Cantina"	Pamela Fryman	Sivert Glarum & Michael Jamin	February 24, 1998	216	15.61
Nina thinks she is the Nina in the song title and regales Maya with the story of her most romantic evening. Maya lets slip at an interview with the singer she knows Nina and arranges a meeting between the two only to find out that Nina's love is not the singer.
22	16	"College or Collagen"	Pamela Fryman	Marsh McCall	February 26, 1998	215	21.82
Mentoring seems to be going really well for Maya - her protégé; Karey is doing well in her first year of college. However, Karey comes to a crossroads wondering what to do with her life. Meanwhile, Finch replaces Allie as Jack's bridge partner and then becomes jealous when Jack wants to play again with her.
23	17	"Nina's Bikini"	Pamela Fryman	Sivert Glarum & Michael Jamin	March 3, 1998	218	15.51
Nina's famous bikini is going to be put in the Model cafe and Jack has Elliott take boudoir photos of him as an anniversary present for his wife.
24	18	"The Kiss"	Darryl Bates	Tom Maxwell & Don Woodard	March 19, 1998	219	22.91
Maya agrees to pose as Elliott's wife in order to get him a great deal on an apartment. Meanwhile, Jack discovers that Finch has been renting out his parking space.
25	19	"Bravefinch"	Leonard R. Garner Jr.	Andrew Gordon & Eileen Conn	March 26, 1998	221	22.04
Jack hires a personal assistant when Finch complains about doing petty errands. Meanwhile, Maya's interview is ruined when she thinks a nicotine patch is a band-aid.
26	20	"Jack's Old Partner"	Leonard R. Garner Jr.	Marsh McCall	April 9, 1998	220	20.03
While writing his memoirs, Jack is unable to write the chapter where he fires his old business partner, Herb. Believing guilt to be the cause of his writer's block, Jack re-employs Herb, only to remember why he fired him all those years ago. Nina tries to evade an IRS audit, first by hiring Finch, then by using Elliott to romantically distract the auditor.
27	21	"Amblushed"	Pamela Fryman	Pam Brady	April 16, 1998	217	21.09
Jack persuades Maya to go and make a speech to a group neglecting to add that the group want to know why the magazine denigrates women; Maya then defends herself but insults her co-workers. Nina decides she wants to stage a comeback as a model, and Elliott decides to cover her in gold paint for the photo shoot.
28	22	"The Emperor"	Jean Sagal	Don Woodard & Tom Maxwell and Sivert Glarum & Michael Jamin	April 23, 1998	223	21.62
Nina decides not to go to a designer's party and Maya goes in her place, making some very choice comments regarding the designer and losing the magazine advertising revenue. She then tries to redeem the situation. At Jack's suggerstion, Elliott starts dating a certain Meredith Baker; yet, Jack's meddling in their relationship makes Elliott look creepy.
29	23	"Rescue Me"	Steven Levitan	Steven Levitan	April 30, 1998	225	22.77
An office blood drive turns into a storytelling session, as Finch, Elliott and Nina tell Maya how her father rescued them from desperate situations.
30	24	"Eve of Destruction"	Pamela Fryman	Jack Burditt and Pam Brady	May 5, 1998	222	14.64
Maya's mother visits the magazine and she and Jack get into a fight about a painting. Elliott, Finch and Nina get nervous when it appears Jack has brought in an efficiency consultant who seems intent on shaking things up.
31	25	"War and Sleaze"	Leonard R. Garner Jr.	Marsh McCall	May 12, 1998	224	14.29
Nina proposes a double date for her and Maya, and Maya senses trouble. She is then proven right when her date, after throwing his back out in her apartment, is revealed to be a United States congressman - and a married one. Meanwhile, the magazine staff participates in a paintball match where Finch unwittingly eliminates Jack three minutes into the war.

=== Season 3 (1998–99) ===
No. overall	No. in season	Title	Directed by	Written by	Original release date	Prod. code	U.S. viewers (millions)
32	1	"What the Teddy Bear Saw"	Leonard R. Garner Jr.	Andrew Gordon & Eileen Conn	September 22, 1998	303	15.29
Jack enlists Finch to stop off at his house and check up on his new nanny.
33	2	"Steamed"	Leonard R. Garner Jr.	Marsh McCall	September 29, 1998	302	13.03
Jack wants the tenants on the floor above Blush to move. Maya is taken in by Finch's lie that he wants them to move so he can build a free daycare center. Nina meets with Greta (Sharon Wyatt), a former model whom she has not seen for years, and is shocked at Greta's putting on weight.
34	3	"The Mask"	Pamela Fryman	Don Woodard & Tom Maxwell	October 27, 1998	304	12.23
Finch claims he wasn't scared by Psycho, so Elliott sets out to prove he's lying. Meanwhile, Maya finds a family photo of Jack taking her out trick-or-treating, and discovers a disturbing secret behind it. Finch and Elliott wonder whether Binnie is real or not.
35	4	"Funny Girl"	Leonard R. Garner Jr.	Danny Zuker	November 3, 1998	305	11.85
Elliott feels harassed when a photography fan starts mailing photos to Elliott, requesting approval and asking for meetings. After Finch claims women are no good at practical jokes, Maya's attempts to prove him wrong go awry. Jack explores the possibility of getting plastic surgery.
36	5	"Two Girls for Every Boy"	Pamela Fryman	Moses Port & David Guarascio	November 10, 1998	306	14.55
Finch is convinced that a model likes him, only it turns out that she likes Maya instead. He sets out to create the ultimate male fantasy: two women. Jack tries to get Nina and Elliott to treat him as just another staff member.
37	6	"The Withholder"	Leonard R. Garner Jr.	Sivert Glarum & Michael Jamin	November 17, 1998	301	13.31
Elliott helps Finch get back at Courtney, Jack makes another bet with Donald Trump: whoever loses less weight has to wear a dress during their golf game.
38	7	"Puppetmaster"	Pamela Fryman	Pam Brady	November 17, 1998	307	12.34
Maya dates the host of a children's puppet show, Steven (played by French Stewart). Maya soon begins to suspect that he is using their dates as subject matter for his TV show. Meanwhile, Nina invests in a nightclub.
39	8	"The List"	Leonard R. Garner Jr.	Marsh McCall	November 24, 1998	309	13.30
Jack drops on the a list of 100 most powerful men, whilst Finch meets Mark Hamill (guest-starring as himself).
40	9	"How Nina Got Her Groove Back"	Leonard R. Garner Jr.	Sivert Glarum & Michael Jamin	December 8, 1998	308	11.66
Nina gets into a catfight with her rival, Vogue's fashion editor, Margo Langhorne, then becomes upset when Margo decides to retire. Having found out that Donald Trump has a sandwich named after him, Jack wants to have something named after him too. Elliott has obtained a pair of designer shoes and even though he is unable to walk in them, he refuses to put them off. Maya meets a good looking guy with chiseled torso, yet she becomes irritated when she realizes that he takes off his shirt at any opportunity.
41	10	"How the Finch Stole Christmas"	Jean Sagal	Stephen Engel	December 15, 1998	310	13.55
Finch sneaks a look at the office Christmas presents; angered by the trivial gift he'll be receiving, he decides to ruin Christmas for the others. Kelsey Grammer narrates.
42	11	"Slow Donnie"	Steven Levitan	Steven Levitan	January 5, 1999	313	14.55
Elliott invites Maya to his house to celebrate his 'slow' brother Donny's birthday. But when left alone with Maya, Donny (played by David Cross) reveals a shocking secret. Donnie also debates Jack on mechanics of the pneumatic tube.
43	12	"A Spy in the House of Me"	Craig Zisk	Andrew Gordon & Eileen Conn	January 12, 1999	314	14.56
Maya's first love, John Kenny, returns to town; while Maya is as happy as ever to be reunited with her old love, Jack and Elliott are not so thrilled. Finch oversees a new group of interns, running things in a manner similar to the bootcamp in An Officer and a Gentleman.
44	13	"Lies & Dolls"	Craig Zisk	Sivert Glarum & Michael Jamin	February 2, 1999	315	13.97
A visiting United States senator becomes smitten with Nina, who he falsely believes to be a Christian homemaker. Nina's true personality is revealed after she is asked to prepare a home cooked meal for the senator. Elliott is ridden by guilt when he recalls that he stole an action figure when a little boy, so he decides to give it back, much to Finch's chagrin.
45	14	"Nina Sees Red: Part 1"	Pamela Fryman	Jack Burditt	February 9, 1999	311	12.42
When Finch's father (played by Brian Dennehy) visits, his romantic overtures toward Nina make Finch uncomfortable.
46	15	"Nina Sees Red: Part 2"	Pamela Fryman	Jack Burditt	February 16, 1999	312	13.45
Finch's father and Nina become engaged. Finch takes the news badly. Brian Dennehy guest stars.
47	16	"Hostess to Murder"	Pamela Fryman	Pam Brady	February 23, 1999	316	13.25
Maya's attempt to host a murder mystery party is plagued with problems.
48	17	"Toy Story"	Pamela Fryman	Danny Zuker	March 2, 1999	318	12.02
As a prank, Finch switches the cards on two of Elliott's birthday gifts: those from Maya and Persky.
49	18	"Miss Pretty"	Pamela Fryman	Story by : David Spancer; Teleplay by : Michael Gara	March 23, 1999	319	13.90
Finch has been secretly writing Blush's advice column under the name Miss Pretty. When Maya, impressed by Finch's writing, asks to meet Miss Pretty, Finch pays a sleazy friend to pose as the columnist.
50	19	"Maya's Nude Photos"	Pamela Fryman	Moses Port & David Guarascio	April 6, 1999	317	13.58
Maya's enrollment in a photography class causes problems on multiple levels between her and Elliott when her teacher assigns Maya to do nude self-portraits. Meanwhile, Finch and Nina both feel cast aside when Jack takes a liking to Nina's new assistant on the basis of his ability to do magic tricks.
51	20	"And the Femmy Goes To..."	Pamela Fryman	Marc Abrams & Michael Benson	May 4, 1999	320	8.57
The nominations for the annual Femmy awards are in and Maya, Nina and Elliott are nominated, while Finch isn't even invited to the ceremony. However, the evening doesn't go exactly as planned for all.
52	21	"Softball"	Pamela Fryman	Jack Burditt	May 4, 1999	321	11.91
The staff prepares for the annual softball game against the magazine Cosmo.
53	22	"Shaking Private Trainer"	Pamela Fryman	Pam Brady	May 11, 1999	322	11.66
After throwing his back out playing with his daughter, Jack vows to get in shape and hires a personal trainer who used to be a Navy SEAL. Nina can't figure out why she's not attracted to the trainer, despite his good looks and his obvious interest in her. Maya enlists Finch's help to co-write a screenplay about a vampire cop.
54	23	"Nina's Choice"	Pamela Fryman	Moses Port & David Guarascio	May 18, 1999	325	11.35
Nina has to choose between two men: a convict and a cop chasing him. Jack, Finch and Elliott bet on each other.
55	24	"The Odd Couple"	Steven Levitan	Don Woodard & Tom Maxwell	May 25, 1999	323	11.78
56	25	"The Odd Couple"	Steven Levitan	Marsh McCall	May 25, 1999	324	11.78
A visit from a successful former acquaintance, Barry (played by Bob Odenkirk), causes Finch to try his luck with a depressed model. Finch announces his engagement to Adrienne. Unfortunately for Finch, Adrienne's hockey playing ex-boyfriend arrives to win her back.

=== Season 4 (1999–2000) ===
No. overall	No. in season	Title	Directed by	Written by	Original release date	Prod. code	U.S. viewers (millions)
57	1	"A Divorce to Remember"	Pamela Fryman	Marsh McCall	September 21, 1999	401	12.60
The cracks begin to show in Finch and Adrienne's relationship as he repeatedly lies to her so he can attend a cat show. Maya and Elliott attend Nina's cult in order to obtain a divorce.
58	2	"When Nina Met Elliott"	Pamela Fryman	Moses Port & David Guarascio	September 28, 1999	402	11.41
Elliott is upset to discover that Nina was responsible for a car accident which destroyed his chance of marriage many years before. Finch and his new wife come under scrutiny from immigration officials when her work permit expires.
59	3	"Blackmail Photographer"	Peter Bonerz	Kell Cahoon & Tom Saunders	November 2, 1999	406	12.13
Elliott is forced to employ an aspiring photographer who is blackmailing him. Maya tries to convince Nina that the Moon landing was not a hoax.
60	4	"Finch Gets Dick"	Pamela Fryman	Sivert Glarum & Michael Jamin	November 9, 1999	403	11.33
Kyle, one of Adrienne's model friends (played by Andy Dick) visits intent on stealing Adrienne away from Finch. In order to defend himself from Kyle's accusations, Finch admits that he's been constantly lying. Adrienne decides to try and salvage their marriage by getting to know the real Dennis "Quimby" Finch. Meanwhile, Nina finds joy singing at a home for the elderly.
61	5	"Jack Vents"	Matthew Diamond	Pam Brady	November 9, 1999	404	11.87
Nina overhears Jack talking to his therapist through an air conditioning vent. She uses this information to control him. Maya dabbles in gambling and accidentally bets $5,000 on a dog race.
62	6	"Hello Goodbye"	Matthew Diamond	Story by : Steven Levitan; Teleplay by : Jack Burditt and Mike Reynolds	November 16, 1999	405	9.61
After meeting each other's friends, Finch and Adrienne admit they have nothing in common. At Jack's command, Maya is doing staff evaluations. Elliott overreacts to a minor criticism.
63	7	"An Axe to Grind"	Pamela Fryman	Brian Reich	November 23, 1999	408	8.97
Finch is in denial about the breakup of his marriage. Maya dates a friend of Elliott's.
64	8	"First Date"	Pamela Fryman	Susan Dickes	November 25, 1999	407	15.45
Maya's annoying assistant Cindy returns, now a major advertising buyer.
65	9	"Love is in the Air"	Pamela Fryman	Kell Cahoon & Tom Saunders	November 30, 1999	409	9.13
Jack runs into an ex-wife and her lover on a flight to Paris, and tries to convince the pair to marry. Back at the office, Nina enlists Kevin to play a practical joke on Dennis and Elliott.
66	10	"Jack Gets Tough"	Leonard R. Garner Jr.	Howard Gewirtz	December 14, 1999	410	9.61
Jack publishes a fabrication in his memoirs claiming that he once beat up Robert Conrad. An attractive saleswoman tricks Finch into buying expensive clothing he cannot afford. Guest starring Conrad as himself.
67	11	"Prescription for Love"	Leonard R. Garner Jr.	Jeff Lowell	January 11, 2000	411	9.65
Elliott's new girlfriend, a beautiful, intelligent doctor, brings out insecurity in Elliott and jealousy in Maya. Finch and Nina bond after finding themselves temporarily homeless and living in the office.
68	12	"When Nina Met Elliott's Mother"	Jean Sagal	Moses Port & David Guarascio	January 25, 2000	412	9.05
While visiting Elliott's parents to lecture a group of girl scouts, Nina inspires Elliott's mother to leave her husband in search of adventure. Jack and Maya accidentally kill Finch's cat, Spartacus, and have trouble dealing with the guilt.
69	13	"Dial 'N' for Murder"	Pamela Fryman	Sivert Glarum & Michael Jamin	February 8, 2000	413	8.98
Nina's first modelling coach asks Nina to euthanise her, but changes her mind after meeting Finch. Maya discovers her new boyfriend is a fat fetishist intent on making her gain weight.
70	14	"Paradise by the Dashboard Light"	Pamela Fryman	Susan Dickes	February 15, 2000	415	8.19
Maya and Elliott struggle with their feelings for each other, while Nina and Jack use a dating service to audition a potential boyfriend for Maya.
71	15	"Tea & Secrecy"	Pamela Fryman	Brian Reich	February 15, 2000	416	8.19
Maya and Elliott try to keep their relationship a secret from the rest of the office, but with little success.
72	16	"The Pirate of Love"	Pamela Fryman	David Nichols	February 22, 2000	414	13.01
Finch attends a sex addicts anonymous meeting and is shocked to see his ex wife there confessing to fantasising about him. Jack bullies his staff into buying cookies to raise money for his daughter's school. Maya's objections to this creates a rift between her and Elliott.
73	17	"With Thee I Swing"	Jean Sagal	Michael Gara	February 29, 2000	418	13.55
Elliott and Maya try to make new friends as a couple. Due to a misunderstanding, they befriend a couple who believe them to be swingers. Jack is so desperate to buy Donald Trump a better gift than Trump buys for him, he forces Finch to betray a friend.
74	18	"Blackjack"	Pamela Fryman	Sivert Glarum & Michael Jamin	March 28, 2000	417	12.59
Jack confronts a man who has been posing as his son (Kadeem Hardison). He takes his fake son on as a protégé, excluding Finch and Maya. Nina and Elliott are judges at the fashion awards, but Elliott is disturbed to find the awards are corrupt and the judges are bribed.
75	19	"Blinded by the Right"	Pamela Fryman	Kell Cahoon & Tom Saunders	April 4, 2000	421	12.42
A morality group is pressuring a supermarket to remove Blush from its shelves because of the smutty cover lines. Finch attends bodyguard school.
76	20	"Hot Nights in Paris"	Pamela Fryman	Moses Port & David Guarascio	April 18, 2000	419	12.42
Maya moves in with Elliott, but their domestic bliss is short lived. Jack and Nina both try to avoid their annual anniversary night out. Guest appearance by Elliott Gould as himself.
77	21	"When Nina Met Her Parents"	Pamela Fryman	Howard Gewirtz	April 27, 2000	420	17.90
Nina is contacted by her birth parents. But when a blood test proves that she is not their real daughter, Nina ignores the result. After seeing Finch nude in a sauna, Elliott and Jack are struck by feelings of inadequacy.
78	22	"Finch on Ice"	Dana De Vally Piazza	Susan Dickes and Brian Reich	May 2, 2000	422	12.49
Finch's old skating partner returns, and asks him to coach her and her new partner. Just before the skating competition, she twists her ankle, forcing Finch to take her place. Maya has dyed her hair blonde. Nina is thrilled that her A&E biography is airing, but when Ed McMahon is struck by a bus, she fears that his death will lead to the cancellation of her program. Ed McMahon appears as himself.
79	23	"A&E Biography: Nina Van Horn"	Pamela Fryman	Pam Brady	May 9, 2000	424	10.79
Nina's exploits are presented on A&E's Biography (The actress playing Van Horn, Wendie Malick would host a series of episodes on the show the week of May 22, 2000.).
80	24	"Fast Times at Finchmont High"	Steven Levitan	Story by : Kell Cahoon & Tom Saunders; Teleplay by : Moses Port & David Guarascio and Robert Cohen	May 16, 2000	423	14.01
Finch returns to high school to research an article for Maya, but is reluctant to leave after becoming popular. Jack discovers Kevin's hidden talent. Nina decides to become celibate. She is then put through a test when a Latino pilot appears. Special Guest: Melissa Joan Hart as Krissy.

=== Season 5 (2000–01) ===
No. overall	No. in season	Title	Directed by	Written by	Original release date	Prod. code	U.S. viewers (millions)
81	1	"Hit the Road, Jack"	Pamela Fryman	Brian Reich	October 12, 2000	501	20.37
Allie leaves Jack for another man. Nina is frustrated after Finch spurns her advances, only to discover that he has been holding a grudge for the past nine years.
82	2	"A Night at the Plaza"	Dana De Vally Piazza	Gabe Sachs & Jeff Judah	October 19, 2000	506	16.49
Jack checks into a hotel suite, and wants to be left alone. However, he is repeatedly interrupted.
83	3	"Mum's the Word"	Peter Bonerz	Maria A. Brown	October 26, 2000	504	15.81
Nina begins dating the star of a TV show who has been filming outside Blush's office. She soon discovers that he lives with his mother, who is determined to destroy their relationship. Elliott confesses to Maya that he once spent a month in jail.
84	4	"Donnie Returns"	Pamela Fryman	Marsh McCall and Tom Maxwell & Don Woodard	November 2, 2000	502	18.04
Elliott's brother Donnie returns. Since his last appearance, he has made a success of himself selling insurance. However, he is unable to regain Maya's trust until an unfortunate event in the hospital.
85	5	"Choosing to be Super"	Pamela Fryman	Moses Port & David Guarascio	November 9, 2000	508	16.48
Maya's best friend from high school arrives. He confesses to Maya that he is a recovering alcoholic, and got in touch to apologise for spreading rumours about her in high school. Maya's refusal to accept his apology causes him to start drinking again. Jack is having a recurring dream in which Kevin attempts to kill him.
86	6	"Brandi, You're a Fine Girl"	Pamela Fryman	Story by : Brian Reich and Maria A. Brown; Teleplay by : Susan Dickes and David Hemingson	November 16, 2000	509	20.20
Finch discovers that childhood friend, Bert, has had a sex change and is now Brandi (Jenny McCarthy). After seeing Nina abusing her new assistant, Elliott tells her that she is Tommy Hilfiger's daughter.
87	7	"The First Thanksgiving"	Pamela Fryman	Howard Gewirtz	November 23, 2000	507	14.65
Maya's perfect thanksgiving turns into a farce due a number of misunderstandings.
88	8	"Slamming Jack"	Pamela Fryman	Susan Dickes	December 7, 2000	503	19.48
After yelling at Jack, Finch is transferred to a dingy downtown office where he meets Jack's previous assistant. Elliott spots Maya's gynaecologist in a strip club.
89	9	"Dog Day Afternoon"	Dana De Vally Piazza	David Hemingson	December 14, 2000	505	19.19
When Maya asks to keep a lost dog, Elliott believes she is testing his suitability as a parent. He pretends to neglect the dog, but when Maya returns him to his rightful owners, Elliott is upset and later kidnaps the dog. Jack wins $50,000 on the lottery, but Finch lied about buying the ticket and must find some way to stop Jack claiming the money.
90	10	"Finch and the Fighter"	Peter Bonerz	Brian Reich	January 4, 2001	510	19.46
Dennis dates a woman boxer, but is threatened by her ex, another woman boxer. Nina, Elliott and Jack cheat at a board game so they can beat Maya.
91	11	"The Gift Piggy"	Peter Bonerz	Gabe Sachs & Jeff Judah	January 11, 2001	511	18.01
Nina and Maya are invited to a party, but suspect they were only asked for the presents. Kevin brings his pet spider to work, but after Jack leaves its cage open, it escapes. Elliott must attend a traffic school being taught by Finch, who refuses to renew Elliott's licence after he misbehaves.
92	12	"The Proposal: Part 1"	Pamela Fryman	Maria A. Brown	January 25, 2001	512	14.84
Jack's engagement ring is returned as part of his divorce settlement. This inspires Elliott to propose to Maya. He agonises over the perfect proposal, but it is almost ruined when a depressed Nina tags along. Elliott convinces her to leave, only to sabotage the event himself by having a panic attack when she accepts his proposal.
93	13	"The Proposal: Part 2"	Pamela Fryman	Moses Port & David Guarascio	February 1, 2001	513	17.22
Elliott proposes to Maya a second time, and she accepts again. However, Elliott has another panic attack. Maya later decides that she cannot stay with him, and kicks him out of their apartment. Finch discovers that Nina rented out Jack's office for a porn shoot, and demands she show the director (Penn Jillette) a script he has written. The director loves his work, and wants to shoot the film in Jack's office.
94	14	"The Auction"	Pamela Fryman	Ross McCall & Aaron Peters	February 8, 2001	515	17.74
Blush is holding a charity auction, with Finch as auctioneer. Jack throws away a present given to him by Finch, upsetting Finch and causing him to misbehave at the auction. Maya and Elliott attend the auction with new partners - Elliott with an illiterate prostitute (Lucy Lawless) posing as a surgeon, and Maya with one of her clients.
95	15	"Maya's and Tigers and Dean, Oh My"	Pamela Fryman	Story by : Ross McCall & Aaron Peters; Teleplay by : Maria A. Brown and Gabe Sachs & Jeff Judah	February 15, 2001	518	16.06
Nina is dating a magician who everyone, including her, believes to be gay. Maya mistreats a new intern (Ashton Kutcher) after comparing him to her high school boyfriend.
96	16	"Sid & Nina"	Pamela Fryman	Brian Reich	February 22, 2001	516	16.67
Finch is working as a DJ at a Bar Mitzvah for Sid. Sid persuades Nina to attend by telling her it will be a glitzy showbiz event. When she arrives and promptly goes to leave, Finch convinces her to stay by telling her Sid is dying.
97	17	"Where's Poppa?"	Pamela Fryman	Susan Dickes and David Hemingson	March 15, 2001	514	14.73
Finch stages a fake burglary to avoid being kicked out of Elliott's apartment. Maya dates a man who Jack worries may be her brother.
98	18	"Erlene and Boo"	Kevin C. Slattery	David Hemingson and Brian Reich	March 29, 2001	520	14.85
Nina's "baby" sister, Erlene (Brooke Shields), arrives at Blush and is an instant hit with the staff. Feeling excluded, Nina destroys her chances of a permanent position at the magazine by telling her that she is disliked. When Nina hears that Erlene has started working at a sleazy bar, she and Finch set off to rescue her. The end of this episode breaks the fourth wall when Brooke Shields objects to her character sleeping with Finch.
99	19	"Fanny Finch"	Pamela Fryman	Story by : Moses Port & David Guarascio; Teleplay by : Susan Dickes and David Hemingson	April 19, 2001	517	13.28
When Finch is visited by his mother, he spots an opportunity to pair her up with Jack. To do this, he must first break up Jack's current relationship. Elliott tries to convince an iconic photographer who has not worked in years to pick up a camera.
100	20	"Sugar Momma"	Richard Boden	Moses Port & David Guarascio	April 26, 2001	521	14.92
Finch is dating an older woman (Kathie Lee Gifford). Nina embarrasses Jack by insulting an actor in a wheelchair at an awards ceremony.
101	21	"Maya Stops Thinking"	Gerren Keith	Susan Dickes and Moses Port & David Guarascio	May 3, 2001	519	12.23
Maya has a one night stand with a man she meets in a bar (Dean Cain), and is surprised to find out the next morning that he is a new employee at Blush. Elliott tries to make the world a better place by doing a good deed to Finch, who however refuses to follow Elliott's example and is intent on proving that evil will always triumph.
102	22	"At Long Last Allie"	Pamela Fryman	Marsh McCall and Tom Maxwell & Don Woodard	May 10, 2001	522	12.92
Jack's ex-wife Allie returns, asking for a job at the magazine. She confides in Finch that she wants to reunite with Jack. Elliott's new girlfriend, a psychiatrist, dumps him after Nina calls him a commitment phobic womaniser during a session.

=== Season 6 (2001–02) ===
No. overall	No. in season	Title	Directed by	Written by	Original release date	Prod. code	U.S. viewers (millions)
103	1	"Finch in the Dogg House"	Pamela Fryman	Brian Reich	September 27, 2001	601	18.60
Finch lands a new job as an assistant to rap star Snoop Dogg after Jack fires him.
104	2	"The Two Faces of Finch: Part 1"	Pamela Fryman	David Hemingson	October 11, 2001	602	18.33
Finch begins dating Betsy (Amy Sedaris), whose personality matches his too closely for comfort.
105	3	"The Two Faces of Finch: Part 2"	Pamela Fryman	David Walpert	October 18, 2001	603	13.86
Betsy uses Elliott to make Finch jealous, while Maya's fight for a raise leads to a showdown with Jack.
106	4	"Bye Bye Binnie"	Pamela Fryman	Maria A. Brown	October 25, 2001	605	14.32
The office is concerned when Nina carries the urn containing a friend's ashes everywhere she goes.
107	5	"Maya Judging Amy"	Pamela Fryman	Donick Cary	November 1, 2001	607	15.99
Maya's new assistant (Tiffani Thiessen) stirs jealousy in the office with her credentials and her good looks. Meanwhile, Elliott helps Kevin make a good impression on his date.
108	6	"Finch Chasing Amy"	Pamela Fryman	Allison Adler	November 8, 2001	606	16.11
Finch and Elliott compete for the affections of the magazine's new sex columnist, Amy (Tiffani Thiessen).
109	7	"The Impossible Dream"	Pamela Fryman	Joe Port & Joe Wiseman	November 15, 2001	608	14.26
Amy decides to separately date both Finch and Elliott. Jack and Nina try to tempt Kevin into taking a promotion by getting him to crave risotto and then revealing that risotto is expensive and requires the money a promotion would bring.
110	8	"The Haves and the Have-Mores"	Pamela Fryman	David Finkel & Brett Baer	December 6, 2001	604	13.27
Jack is determined to impress his billionaire peer; Maya helps a mail clerk get over his obsession with Nina.
111	9	"Christmas? Christmas!"	Pamela Fryman	David Finkel & Brett Baer	December 13, 2001	611	17.79
Ray Liotta visits the Blush Christmas party, and he and Maya bond over their love of the holiday season. They begin dating, and Maya finds out just how crazy Ray is about Christmas.
112	10	"Nina Van Mom"	Pamela Fryman	Story by : Joe Port & Joe Wiseman; Teleplay by : Brian Reich	January 10, 2002	612	16.70
Nina is tracked down by the child she gave up for adoption. The two have nothing in common, but Nina eventually decides to get to know her daughter, only to be told that she is also a grandmother. Jack takes up darts and challenges Elliott to a game, but reacts badly when he loses.
113	11	"Nina Van Grandma"	Pamela Fryman	David Walpert	January 17, 2002	614	15.52
Nina finds she has much more in common with her granddaughter than her daughter. Jack can't understand why Maya rejects his birthday gift.
114	12	"Liotta? Liotta!"	Pamela Fryman	Allison Adler	January 31, 2002	615	16.65
Maya dates Ray Liotta, but struggles to cope with his celebrity. As a result, Ray quits show business. Jack becomes obsessed with George Washington after buying Washington's desk. Jay Leno makes his second guest appearance.
115	13	"About a Boy"	Pamela Fryman	David Hemingson	February 7, 2002	617	18.93
Finch pretends to be the father of a small child to trick an au pair (Shannon Elizabeth) into sleeping with him. Elliott feels betrayed by Jack after falling victim to a loyalty test.
116	14	"Friends and Neighbors"	Pamela Fryman	David Hemingson and Maria A. Brown	February 28, 2002	610	15.42
Finch and Kevin move into the apartment above Maya, much to her annoyance. However, when a space opens up in student accommodation, Finch moves out. Elliott sells Jack his beloved classic Ford Mustang, only to be dismayed when Jack fails to take care of it.
117	15	"Blind Ambition"	Pamela Fryman	Donick Cary	March 7, 2002	613	15.45
Maya dates Nina's blind ex-boyfriend. Finch takes a television course at college, and begins making a television show in which he humiliates Elliott.
118	16	"A Beautiful Mind"	Pamela Fryman	Allison Adler	March 25, 2002	621	9.60
Maya dates a sweet, but unintelligent exterminator. Finch and Elliott pay Kevin to eat disgusting foods.
119	17	"Educating Finch"	Pamela Fryman	Jessica Kaminsky	March 28, 2002	616	13.58
Elliott displays a nude photo of Maya at an art gallery without her consent. Dismayed at Finch's failing grades, Jack hires him a tutor.
120	18	"The Book of Jack"	Pamela Fryman	Story by : Hillel Abrams; Teleplay by : Taylor Hamra	April 4, 2002	609	14.71
Jack takes some time off to write the "Great American Novel", but after suffering from writer's block, pays someone else to write it for him. Left in charge of Blush, Maya, Elliott and Nina bicker over every decision.
121	19	"Blush Gets Some Therapy"	Pamela Fryman	Brian Reich	April 11, 2002	620	14.29
After an argument scares off an important client, Jack hires a corporate therapist (guest star Stephen Root). While Nina, Finch and Maya excel, Elliott feels victimised by the therapist.
122	20	"The Burning House"	Pamela Fryman	Donick Cary and David Walpert	April 18, 2002	622	11.51
A behind the scenes documentary following Finch as he films his class project The Burning House, the story of a family torn apart by divorce. This episode is unusual in that it is filmed with handheld cameras interspersed with talking head interviews, and there is no studio audience. Guest starring David Hasselhoff.
123	21	"The Bad Grandma"	Pamela Fryman	Joe Port & Joe Wiseman	April 25, 2002	619	13.08
Elliott feels rejected after his grandmother chooses to spend all her time with Finch. Meanwhile, in order to display his patriotism, Jack has an enormous flag hung from the side of the building, only to regret his decision when it blocks his office window.
124	22	"The Boys in the Band"	Pamela Fryman	Story by : Erica Rothschild; Teleplay by : David Finkel & Brett Baer	May 2, 2002	618	14.12
Nina is embarrassed by her new boyfriend's air guitar band. Jack draws Maya into his personal competition with Alan Thicke. Guest stars Huey Lewis, Alan Thicke and C.C. Deville.

=== Season 7 (2002–03) ===
No. overall	No. in season	Title	Directed by	Written by	Original release date	Prod. code	U.S. viewers (millions)
125	1	"Guess Who's Coming to Blush"	Pamela Fryman	Jon Pollack & Judd Pillot & John Peaslee	October 8, 2002	701	6.62
Jack employs a woman off the street to work at Blush, but the staff think it's just because Jack wants to seduce her. Meanwhile, Finch tries to get an upset female co-worker to take comfort in his arms.
126	2	"Mr. Jealousy"	Pamela Fryman	David Hemingson	October 15, 2002	702	7.96
When Jack starts liking Vicki, Finch gets scared, so he sets her up to look bad, but he's not sure if Vicki will try to get him back. Meanwhile, Nina brings in a woman off the street to show Jack that it was wrong to employ Vicki.
127	3	"Nina and the Rocker"	Pamela Fryman	David Walpert	October 22, 2002	703	7.17
Nina starts going out with a British rock star named Simon Leeds. Meanwhile, Maya persuades Vicki to give her details about her divorce. Also, Jack starts showing off his new pocket watch.
128	4	"Halloween? Halloween!"	Pamela Fryman	David Finkel & Brett Baer	October 29, 2002	705	6.60
Nina throws a party to celebrate Halloween, where Finch and Jack compete for Blush's new model, Kelly. Meanwhile, Elliott tries to keep Vicki from going home with a guy she met at the party.
129	5	"Da Sister Who Loved DiMauro"	Pamela Fryman	Mike Lisbe & Nate Reger	November 12, 2002	706	6.82
Rhonda, the beautiful sister of Vicki, immediately falls for Elliott. However, when Elliott tries to use Rhonda to make Vicki jealous, he finds himself in an awkward situation. Meanwhile, Jack sets up cameras to keep an eye on everyone, while he's at home recovering from his foot surgery.
130	6	"That Burning Passion"	Pamela Fryman	Stephen Lloyd	November 19, 2002	708	6.69
Maya falls in love with a gorgeous fire fighter, but it turns out that he is Vicki's separated husband. Jealousy causes friction between Nina and Simon.
131	7	"The Write Stuff"	Pamela Fryman	Paul A. Kaplan & Mark Torgove	December 3, 2002	704	6.51
Finch thinks up a scheme to use sad stories from his college life to gain sympathy from Maya. Meanwhile, Nina redoes the pin-up shot that brought her fame.
132	8	"It's Raining Babies"	Pamela Fryman	Brett Baer & David Finkel	January 7, 2003	707	6.19
Finch tries to set up Vicki and Nina telling each of them that the other one is a lesbian. When they find out, they decide to wreak revenge on him. Finch also gets to know that Jack is meeting George Lucas and is desperate to be allowed to be there too. Meanwhile, Elliott feels underappreciated after some magazine publishes a photo that was rejected by Jack and behaves arrogantly, so Jack to teach him a lesson gives him absolute artistic freedom, thinking that Elliott will not cope without having any limits; yet, his plan backfires.
133	9	"Watch Your Backdraft"	Pamela Fryman	Vivien Mejia	January 14, 2003	709	6.32
When Finch wants a reserved parking space, Elliott discovers his plan and seeks to make sure that it does not work. Meanwhile, Nina makes Maya's romantic life the subject of office gossip.
134	10	"Pictures Of Lily"	Pamela Fryman	Mark Torgove & Paul A. Kaplan	April 22, 2003	712	4.68
A former fashion model finds herself very confused by Finch's behavior. Meanwhile, Jack tries to bond with Nina's new boyfriend, a British rock star.
135	11	"The Comedy Stylings Of Rivers & Red"	Pamela Fryman	David Finkel & Brett Baer	April 22, 2003	721	4.87
Finch's father accepts a job as Jack's chauffeur. Meanwhile, Elliott tries to get revenge against an insult comic who has made Elliott his latest target. A meeting with a past boyfriend of Maya's has her very nervous.
136	12	"The Talented Mr. Finch"	Pamela Fryman	Nate Reger & Mike Lisbe	July 12, 2003	713	2.51
Finch doesn't remember to tell Jack about an important meeting with foreign clients, so he pretends to be Jack, and attempts to make a deal with the clients, without Jack's knowledge.
137	13	"There's Something About Allison"	Pamela Fryman	Ellen Byron & Lissa Kapstrom	July 12, 2003	716	2.61
Finch's old buddy Brandy - a transsexual woman whom Finch knew as Bert - joins Finch at their high school reunion. Meanwhile, Maya and Elliott decide to become intimate, but without any strings attached.
138	14	"Rivals In Romance"	Pamela Fryman	David Hemingson	July 19, 2003	711	2.39
Finch and Jack prepare for a meeting with the publisher of Blush's biggest rival magazine, Tate Gittling, in an attempt to join forces for a charity function.
139	15	"A Simple Kiss Of Fate"	Pamela Fryman	Hillel Abrams	July 19, 2003	717	2.62
Simon is about to ask Nina to marry him, but she panics when she has to tell him that she's married to her last husband (Jon Lovitz). Jack is not happy with the environmentalist Maya's dating, when he eventually accepts him the man shows up super-high. After Finch finds out that Jack has left him a million dollars in his will, he has dreams of killing Jack.
140	16	"Donnie Redeemed"	Pamela Fryman	David Hemingson	August 2, 2003	720	2.15
Elliott's brother returns, accompanied by his new fiancée, and is now sorry for conning his brother in the past. However, Elliott doesn't trust him and thinks that this is another one of his scams.
141	17	"My Fair Finchy"	Pamela Fryman	David Walpert	August 2, 2003	718	2.20
Maya tries to curb the overt flirtation between Finch and Rhonda (Gina Gershon); she invites them for dinner so that they could watch Maya and her boyfriend Adam "interact as a couple". Meanwhile, to get the best treatment from Blush's office cleaner Marjorie (Megan Cavanagh), Nina and Jack pretend fondness for her.
142	18	"Son Of A Preacher Man"	Pamela Fryman	Paul A. Kaplan & Mark Torgove	August 9, 2003	719	2.18
After Elliott moves into the building that Jack lives in, he forms a protest against the building association. Meanwhile, Simon's parents leave Nina with an erroneous first impression.
143	19	"The Last Temptation Of Elliott"	Pamela Fryman	Aaron Korsh	August 9, 2003	722	2.20
A new Blush intern takes a strong liking to Maya. Finch pretends to be a sinner needing salvation when he goes to Elliott's Bible-study class.
144	20	"For The Last Time, I Do"	Pamela Fryman	Jon Pollack & Judd Pillot & John Peaslee	August 16, 2003	723	2.4
Prenuptial tensions beset Nina upon learning that the minister is her intended's former girlfriend, who's still very fond of him.
145	21	"Future Issues"	Pamela Fryman	Steven Levitan	August 16, 2003	724	2.8
In the series finale, Jack retires, and his staff share memories, shed tears and pay affectionate tribute. Furthermore, Nina likens Jack to a nice glass of scotch.
146	22	"Evaluate This!"	Pamela Fryman	Ellen Byron & Lissa Kapstrom	November 24, 2003 (in syndication)	710	N/A
Jack ask the magazine staff for anonymous evaluations, but by a process of elimination he discovers that only Vicki was critical of him.
147	23	"The Goodbye Girl"	Pamela Fryman	David Walpert	November 25, 2003 (in syndication)	714	N/A
Nina takes the actress impersonating her in a cabaret show under her wing, and Finch abuses his new boss, Elliott.
148	24	"Strange Bedfellows"	Pamela Fryman	Stephen Lloyd	November 26, 2003 (in syndication)	715	N/A
Nina's friend Binny appears from the dead to tell her that she will cheat on Simon.
