= The Sacrifice (upcoming film) =

Upcoming Horror film

- Directed by: Prime Cruz
- Written by: Jerrold Tarog
- Produced by: Montgomery Blencowe; Mark Stewart
- Starring: Lovi Poe; Timothy Granaderos; Enchong Dee; Max Collins; Lav Diaz; Louie Chapman; Piolo Pascual; Pokwang
- Production companies: C'est Lovi Productions; Kind Hearts Entertainment
- Countries: Philippines; United Kingdom
- Language: English

The Sacrifice is an upcoming psychological horror film directed by Prime Cruz, written by Jerrold Tarog. The film stars Lovi Poe, Timothy Granaderos, Enchong Dee, and Lav Diaz.

== Premise ==
The film follows a group of travel vloggers who find themselves in a remote village haunted by ancient rituals and a terrifying legend.

== Cast ==
- Lovi Poe as Gail
- Timothy Granaderos as Mike
- Enchong Dee as Danny
- Lav Diaz as Pilo
- Max Collins as Anne
- Louie Chapman as Eric
- Pokwang as Hilda
- Piolo Pascual as Marty

== Production ==
In April 2025, it was announced that Lovi Poe, Timothy Granaderos, Enchong Dee, and Lav Diaz were part of the cast for The Sacrifice. Filming took place in the Philippines. Principal photography concluded as of June 2025.

Lav Diaz shared his views with Variety about his rare acting role "I love the character. He’s a conflicted person — he paints a picture of the type of person we see every day. The greatest struggle in life is how to be a good human being, and I think Pilo embodies that conflict".
