= Who Invited Them =

- Blu-ray Disc cover
- Directed by: Duncan Birmingham
- Screenplay by: Duncan Birmingham
- Produced by: Mary Pat Bentel
- Starring: Ryan Hansen; Melissa Tang; Timothy Granaderos; Perry Mattfeld
- Cinematography: Chananun Chotrungroj, Bruce Thierry Cheung
- Edited by: Patrick Lawrence
- Music by: Ben Lovett
- Production company: Shudder
- Distributed by: AMP International
- Release date: September 1, 2022 (USA)
- Running time: 81 minutes
- Country: United States
- Language: English

Who Invited Them is a 2022 American horror film directed by Duncan Birmingham and starring Ryan Hansen, Melissa Tang, Timothy Granaderos, and Perry Mattfeld. The film was released on Shudder on September 1, 2022, to a critical success.

== Plot ==
A married couple, Adam and Margo, buy a large, expensive house in a prestigious area. Although Margo thinks that such a place is too posh for them, Adam still throws a housewarming party to show off to his colleagues and superiors. When the guests have already left, the hosts suddenly discover an unfamiliar couple in the house. Profuse in apologies and compliments, they present themselves as wealthy neighbors who came to quarrel over parking slots but changed their minds about spoiling the event. Adam and Margo's child spends the night with friends, so they decide to continue the evening in the company of new acquaintances who are, in fact, duplicitous and dangerous impostors.

== Cast ==
- Ryan Hansen as Adam
- Melissa Tang as Margo
- Timothy Granaderos as Tom
- Perry Mattfeld as Sasha
- Tipper Newton as Teeny
- Barry Rothbart as Frank

== Reception ==
The film has an 80% rating on Rotten Tomatoes based on 23 reviews.

Simon Abrams of RogerEbert.com wrote, "A Hollywood Hills housewarming party eventually turns deadly in “Who Invited Them,” a staid home invasion thriller about a timid married couple who are bullied by two flirtatious strangers. More experienced—or funnier, or more exploitation-adept—filmmakers might have at least hit the mark for shock value in this ostensibly psycho-satirical button-pusher." Michelle Swope of Bloody Disgusting! commented, "Either way, from beginning to end, Who Invited Them is a blast, a party you won’t want to be over, and an impressive directorial debut." Katie Rife of Dread Central mentioned. "Birmingham does a good job teasing the audience with the possibility of violence, while coyly withholding the orgy of bloodshed that seems sure to explode at some point."
