= Out of Practice =

- Genre: Sitcom
- Created by: Joe Keenan; Christopher Lloyd
- Starring: Christopher Gorham Paula Marshall Ty Burrell Jennifer Tilly Henry Winkler Stockard Channing
- Composers: Bruce Miller; Jason Miller
- Country of origin: United States
- Original language: English
- No. of seasons: 1
- No. of episodes: 22 (8 unaired)

Production
- Executive producers: Joe Keenan; Henry Winkler; Christopher Lloyd; James Widdoes
- Producer: Maggie Blanc
- Camera setup: Multi-camera
- Running time: 30 minutes
- Production companies: Knotty Entertainment; Picador Productions; Paramount Television

Original release
- Network: CBS
- Release: September 19, 2005 – March 29, 2006

Out of Practice is an American sitcom television series that was produced by Paramount Television and originally broadcast on sister company CBS from September 19, 2005, to March 29, 2006. With producers Joe Keenan and Christopher Lloyd (Frasier's producers) at the helm, the show was about a family of five doctors who had little in common and usually did not get along. CBS officially cancelled it on May 17, 2006, at its upfront presentation.

== Plot ==
Ben Barnes is the youngest son and central character. As a marriage counselor and the only non-physician, the rest of his family sees him as a lesser doctor. His wife left him in the pilot episode.

Ben's father, Stewart Barnes, is a gastroenterologist who is happy to be free from the influence of his ex-wife, Lydia Barnes (Stockard Channing in her third sitcom starring role following Stockard Channing in Just Friends and The Stockard Channing Show), a status-conscious cardiologist and mother of their three children.

Ben's brother, Oliver Barnes, is a self-centered plastic surgeon and committed womanizer. Their sister, Regina Barnes, is a lesbian E.R. doctor, who like Oliver, is infatuated with attractive women. Crystal, Stewart's girlfriend and receptionist, is a source of frustration and awkwardness for all except Stewart. Tilly was a late addition to the cast and is not seen much in the pilot.

== Cast ==
- Christopher Gorham as Benjamin "Ben" Barnes
- Paula Marshall as Regina Barnes, Ben's older sister
- Ty Burrell as Oliver Barnes, Ben's older brother
- Jennifer Tilly as Crystal, Stewart's girlfriend
- Henry Winkler as Stewart Barnes, Ben's father
- Stockard Channing as Lydia Barnes, Ben's mother

== Episodes ==
No.	Title	Directed by	Written by	Original release date	Prod. code	Viewers (millions)
1	"Pilot"	Kelsey Grammer	Joe Keenan & Christopher Lloyd	September 19, 2005	001	13.18
Ben, who is a couples counselor, learns that his wife may be leaving him. This news comes to him at his own 30th birthday party with all his family present, including his father's new girlfriend.
2	"We Wanna Hold Your Hand"	James Widdoes	Joe Keenan	September 26, 2005	003	11.51
The Barnes family bands together to help Ben get over his broken marriage.
3	"And I'll Cry If I Want To"	Sheldon Epps	Tucker Cawley	October 3, 2005	005	11.73
When their coworkers discover Stewart's dating Crystal, Lydia decides to throw a party to prove that she's moved on, but disaster ensues when Oliver scores her a date with a gigolo.
4	"The Truth About Nerds & Dogs"	Sheldon Epps	Bob Daily	October 10, 2005	004	12.26
Lydia is jealous of Stewart because Monty, the family dog, likes him more.
5	"Brothers Grim"	James Widdoes	Alex Barnow & Marc Firek	October 17, 2005	002	12.25
When Oliver is forced out of his fabulous apartment, he moves in with his brother Ben.
6	"The Heartbreak Kid"	Scott Ellis	DJ Nash	October 24, 2005	008	13.09
Ben is forced to "break up" with his mother when he realizes she is using him to avoid dating again.
7	"Key Ingredients"	Mark Cendrowski	Sivert Glarum & Michael Jamin	November 7, 2005	010	12.17
Lydia and Regina are forced into a cooking class together, and Lydia gets friendly with the chef. Crystal misunderstands a simple gesture by Stewart, so he asks Ben and Oliver for advice.
8	"The Wedding"	Sheldon Epps	Sivert Glarum, Michael Jamin & DJ Nash	November 14, 2005	012	12.20
As the family attends the wedding of one of Oliver's old girlfriends, Lydia frets over feeling awkward at the ceremony since she is now divorced. Meanwhile, Oliver wants to show up the bride by bringing a hot date to the ceremony, but his companions keep leaving him.
9	"Thanks"	Mark Cendrowski	Christopher Lloyd	November 21, 2005	009	13.26
The siblings and their parents gather together for Thanksgiving (Crystal is out of town). Then they start to reminisce about the past Thanksgiving family get-togethers, before Stewart and Lydia's divorce: 1 year ago, 6 years ago, 7 years ago... and 1 year ago, again.
10	"Guilt Trip"	Sheldon Epps	David Litt	November 28, 2005	006	12.99
Lydia becomes jealous when the kids befriend Crystal, then makes them go with her to visit their former housekeeper.
11	"New Year's Eve"	Philip Charles MacKenzie	Joe Keenan	December 19, 2005	011	15.02
Ben, Oliver and Regina throw a wild New Year's Eve party so they can meet hot dates, but their plans are quickly thwarted by the arrival of their parents. Lydia has invited a handsome man she met at the hospital to the party and has no idea that he is Crystal's father.
12	"Yours, Mine or His?"	Gail Mancuso	Alex Barnow & Marc Firek	January 9, 2006	015	13.74
The whole family gets stuck together in a snowy mountain cabin and the guys find a pregnancy test, but they don't know if it belongs to Crystal or Oliver's new girlfriend (who has slept with Oliver and Ben).
13	"Model Behavior"	Joe Regalbuto	David Litt	March 22, 2006	017	6.94
Stewart and Lydia pretend to still be married to one another while his former receptionist visits. Oliver wants to stop dating a woman whom he finds annoying, but feels horrible because she happens to be friends with Ben.
14	"Hot Water"	Joe Regalbuto	Sivert Glarum & Michael Jamin	March 29, 2006	016	5.94
Stewart ends up in the ER with a backache on, of all days, Valentine's Day. Ben somehow gets locked in Crystal's bathroom while she is taking a bath, and Oliver tries his best to get out of a Valentine's dinner with his mother.
15	"You Win Some, You Use Some"	Mark Cendrowski	Alex Barnow & Marc Firek	Unaired	022	N/A
Oliver, Regina and Lydia all decide to use family members for their own personal gain. Meanwhile, Stewart tries to find a way to get Ben to take his lazy housekeeper.
16	"Doctor of the Year"	Joe Regalbuto	DJ Nash	Unaired	020	N/A
Stewart ends up being named one of the city's top doctors by a Manhattan magazine. However, he is less than thrilled when his old rival shows up at his celebration party with none other than Lydia.
17	"Restaurant Row"	Bob Koherr	Bob Daily	Unaired	014	N/A
At the funeral of an uncle, Oliver and Ben meet a girl they both were in love with when they were kids. When she calls the next day and leaves a message to meet for a date, no one knows whom she meant and both are convinced to be the one she asked for. Meanwhile, Lydia and Stewart are arguing about what their inheritance might be.
18	"Losing Patients"	Kelsey Grammer	Joe Keenan	Unaired	019	N/A
Ben loses a patient to Oliver, then Oliver loses a patient to Ben. Meanwhile, Stewart and Lydia are audited by the IRS.
19	"Doctors Without Bidders"	Joe Regalbuto	Alex Barnow & Marc Firek	Unaired	018	N/A
Lydia is arranging a bachelor auction and Benjamin feels left out when his mother doesn't ask him to be in it. Oliver helps Lydia to set Regina up with a doctor she has interviewed, but they know it won't work if Lydia shows signs of support.
20	"If These Floors Could Talk"	Sheldon Epps	Alex Barnow & Marc Firek	Unaired	013	N/A
Stewart has the brilliant idea to put Lydia and Crystal in the same place in the hopes that they'll bond, but it backfires on him because they ended up sharing horror stories about Stewart instead. Meanwhile, Lydia's planning to have her living room floor redone but, unbeknownst to her, Ben and Oliver had stashed a hidden treasure underneath her floorboards since childhood — a treasure which Lydia had accused Regina of stealing for 25 years.
21	"The Lady Doth Protest Too Much"	Mark Cendrowski	Sivert Glarum & Michael Jamin	Unaired	007	N/A
While Stewart tries to hook Ben up with the new neighbor, he is far too busy keeping it a secret that his ex-wife Naomi has returned and possibly wants to rekindle the relationship.
22	"Breaking Up Is Hard to Do. And Do. And..."	Joe Regalbuto	Sivert Glarum & Michael Jamin	Unaired	021	N/A
Stewart accidentally suffered a hernia and has to go to the hospital for a surgery. While he's waiting to be prepped, the other Barnes family members are suffering relationship problems all around him. As Stewart wonders if the distractions his doctor and his anesthesiologist are having might cause his untimely death during surgery, the rest of the Barnes are wondering if they're cursed to be alone forever.

== Broadcast ==
Rumors of cancellation circulated after midseason replacement The New Adventures of Old Christine opened in the show's time slot in March 2006. In an interview, however, Burrell asserted that "[w]e're going on hiatus from the air for two months, but we're coming back in March with all-new shows." Two more episodes were shown on Wednesday, March 22, and Wednesday, March 29, at 8 ET/PT. The series was pulled from the schedule along with Courting Alex due to low ratings.

=== Syndication ===
As of December 2009, the show is being broadcast on Universal HD. The show's full 22 episodes are available to view as part of Amazon's streaming service.

=== International airings ===
Beginning in April 2008, the show was broadcast on Comedy Central Poland at a rate of three episodes per week. The series was also shown in Australia, at 6:30pm Saturdays from October 2006; however the series attracted low audience shares, and was consequently taken off after five weeks. It reappeared in mid-2007 in a late-night timeslot, where it completed its run. In Autumn of 2006 it was aired on AVALA in Serbia daily, with a re-run in 2007.

== Reception ==
In early July 2006, it was announced that Channing was nominated for the Primetime Emmy Award for Outstanding Lead Actress in a Comedy Series for her work on Out of Practice.
