= Blunt Talk =

- Genre: Sitcom
- Created by: Jonathan Ames
- Starring: Patrick Stewart; Jacki Weaver; Adrian Scarborough; Dolly Wells; Timm Sharp; Mary Holland; Karan Soni
- Theme music composer: Moby
- Opening theme: "Blunt Talk Theme"
- Country of origin: United States
- Original language: English
- No. of seasons: 2
- No. of episodes: 20

Production
- Executive producers: Seth MacFarlane; Jonathan Ames; Stephanie Davis; Tristram Shapeero
- Running time: 27–30 minutes
- Production companies: MRC Television; The Herring Wonder; Fuzzy Door Productions

Original release
- Network: Starz
- Release: August 22, 2015 – December 11, 2016

Blunt Talk is an American television sitcom on the Starz cable network starring Patrick Stewart, created by Jonathan Ames, and executive produced by Seth MacFarlane. The series' first two episodes were released online on August 15, 2015, and premiered on Starz on August 22, 2015. The first season concluded on October 24, 2015.

Starz ordered 20 episodes, which were split into two seasons. The second season premiered on October 2, 2016, and concluded on December 11, 2016. On December 20, 2016, the show was cancelled after two seasons.

== Premise ==
The show follows British newscaster Walter Blunt who moves to Los Angeles with the intention of conquering American nightly cable news. His misguided decisions on and off the air prove that his ultimate ambitions will be difficult to achieve.

Blunt's name was taken from the minor character Sir Walter Blunt in William Shakespeare's Henry IV, Part 1, which was Stewart's first role with the Royal Shakespeare Company.

== Cast ==
=== Main ===
- Patrick Stewart as Walter Blunt, Falklands War veteran and former Royal Marines major turned cable journalist.
- Jacki Weaver as Rosalie Winter
- Adrian Scarborough as Harry Chandler, Falklands War veteran and former Royal Marines lance corporal turned Walter's valet
- Dolly Wells as Celia, Walter's producer
- Timm Sharp as Jim Stone
- Mary Holland as Shelly Tinkle (recurring season 1; starring season 2)
- Karan Soni as Martin Bassi (recurring season 1; starring season 2)

=== Recurring ===
- Richard Lewis as Dr. Weiss, Walter's psychiatrist
- Golden Brooks as Vivian, Blunt's ex-wife
- Ed Begley, Jr. as Teddy Winter, Rosalie's husband
- Fred Melamed as Dr. Mendelson, Walter's second psychiatrist
- Romany Malco as Bob Gardner, Walter's boss
- Brent Spiner as Phil, a pianist at the bar Walter frequents.
- Lesley Ann Warren as Cornelia
- Erik Griffin as Gershawn
- Trace Lysette as Giselle
- Swati Kapila

=== Guest stars ===
- Elisabeth Shue as Suzanne Mayview
- Jason Schwartzman as Duncan Adler
- Sharon Lawrence as Sophie
- Moby as himself
- Daniel Stewart as Rafe Blunt

== Episodes ==
Season	Episodes	Originally released	
Season	Episodes	First released	Last released
1	10	August 22, 2015	October 24, 2015
2	10	October 2, 2016	December 11, 2016

=== Season 1 (2015) ===
No. overall	No. in season	Title	Directed by	Written by	Original release date	U.S. viewers (millions)
1	1	"I Seem to Be Running Out of Dreams for Myself"	Tristram Shapeero	Jonathan Ames	August 22, 2015	0.446
2	2	"I Experience Shame and Anticipate Punishment"	Tristram Shapeero	Jonathan Ames	August 29, 2015	0.341
3	3	"All My Relationships End in Pain"	Michael Lehmann	Jonathan Ames	September 5, 2015	0.204
4	4	"A Beaver That's Lost Its Mind"	Michael Lehmann	Reed Agnew & Eli Jorne and Jonathan Ames	September 12, 2015	0.221
5	5	"The Queen of Hearts"	Bill D'Elia	Kirsten Kearse and Jonathan Ames	September 19, 2015	0.169
6	6	"Goodnight, My Someone"	Bill D'Elia	Sam Sklaver and Jonathan Ames	September 26, 2015	0.179
7	7	"Meth or No Meth, You Still Gotta Floss"	Michael Lehmann	Duncan Birmingham and Jonathan Ames	October 3, 2015	0.160
8	8	"Who Kisses So Early in the Morning?"	Michael Lehmann	Jim Margolis and Jonathan Ames	October 10, 2015	0.183
9	9	"I Brought a Petting Goat!"	Tristram Shapeero	Jonathan Ames	October 17, 2015	0.136
10	10	"Let's Save Central Florida! Let's Save Midtown!"	Tristram Shapeero	Sam Sklaver and Jonathan Ames	October 24, 2015	0.161

=== Season 2 (2016) ===
No. overall	No. in season	Title	Directed by	Written by	Original release date	U.S. viewers (millions)
11	1	"I Remember That Time More Like a Movie I Saw Than a Life I Lived"	Tristram Shapeero	Jonathan Ames	October 2, 2016	0.160
12	2	"If It Comes in a Plastic Bag, Don't Eat It"	Tristram Shapeero	Sam Sklaver and Jonathan Ames	October 9, 2016	0.135
13	3	"Your Therapist and His P.... Are Here"	Leslye Headland	Duncan Birmingham & Jonathan Ames	October 16, 2016	0.095
14	4	"How Is It That Every Conversation We Have Comes Back to the Size of Your Penis"	Leslye Headland	Jeanne Darst and Jonathan Ames	October 23, 2016	0.112
15	5	"It's Been Months Since I Kidnapped You"	Bill D'Elia	Kirsten Kearse & Jonathan Ames	October 30, 2016	0.105
16	6	"Love Is Not Linear"	Tristram Shapeero	Robbie Macdonald and Jonathan Ames	November 6, 2016	0.119
17	7	"I Can't Believe I Made Love to a Sociopath"	Michael Lehmann	Sam Sklaver & Jonathan Ames	November 13, 2016	0.155
18	8	"A Cell Doesn't Have to Be a Closet"	Michael Lehmann	Duncan Birmingham & Jonathan Ames	November 20, 2016	0.107
19	9	"Walter Has to Look After Walter"	Tristram Shapeero	Kirsten Kearse & Jonathan Ames	December 4, 2016	0.098
20	10	"Is This All Because I Didn't Call You"	Tristram Shapeero	Jonathan Ames	December 11, 2016	0.077

== Ratings ==
=== Season 1 ===
Viewership and ratings per episode of Blunt Talk
No.	Title	Air date	Rating/share (18–49)	Viewers (millions)	Ref.
1	"I Seem to Be Running Out of Dreams for Myself"	August 22, 2015	0.13	0.446	
2	"I Experience Shame and Anticipate Punishment"	August 29, 2015	0.15	0.341	
3	"All My Relationships End in Pain"	September 5, 2015	0.07	0.204	
4	"A Beaver That's Lost Its Mind"	September 12, 2015	0.10	0.221	
5	"The Queen of Hearts"	September 19, 2015	0.05	0.169	
6	"Goodnight, My Someone"	September 26, 2015	0.03	0.179	
7	"Meth or No Meth, You Still Gotta Floss"	October 3, 2015	0.06	0.160	
8	"Who Kisses So Early in the Morning?"	October 10, 2015	0.07	0.183	
9	"I Brought a Petting Goat!"	October 17, 2015	0.05	0.136	
10	"Let's Save Central Florida! Let's Save Midtown!"	October 24, 2015	0.04	0.161	

=== Season 2 ===
Viewership and ratings per episode of Blunt Talk
No.	Title	Air date	Rating/share (18–49)	Viewers (millions)	Ref.
1	"I Remember That Time More Like a Movie I Saw Than a Life I Lived"	October 2, 2016	0.06	0.160	
2	"If It Comes in a Plastic Bag, Don't Eat It"	October 9, 2016	0.05	0.135	
3	"Your Therapist and His P.... Are Here"	October 16, 2016	0.03	0.095	
4	"How Is It That Every Conversation We Have; Comes Back to the Size of Your Penis"	October 23, 2016	0.04	0.112	
5	"It's Been Months Since I Kidnapped You"	October 30, 2016	0.03	0.105	
6	"Love Is Not Linear"	November 6, 2016	0.05	0.119	
7	"I Can't Believe I Made Love to a Sociopath"	November 13, 2016	0.07	0.155	
8	"A Cell Doesn't Have to Be a Closet"	November 20, 2016	0.04	0.107	
9	"Walter Has to Look After Walter"	December 4, 2016	0.02	0.098	
10	"Is This All Because I Didn't Call You"	December 11, 2016	0.02	0.077	

== Reception ==
=== Critical response ===
Blunt Talk received generally mixed reviews from critics. Review aggregator Rotten Tomatoes gives the first season of the show a rating of 53%, based on 34 reviews, with an average rating of 6.5/10. The site's consensus states: "Blunt Talk squanders Sir Patrick Stewart's considerable gifts on a show that too often mistakes forced vulgarity for wit." Metacritic gives the show a score of 54 out of 100, based on reviews from 24 critics, indicating "mixed or average reviews".

Dominic Patten of Deadline Hollywood stated in his review: "If the new series from creator Jonathan Ames and executive producer Seth MacFarlane was just a mix between another Network-inspired show about journalism and some very consistently bad behavior on the part of Patrick Stewart’s cable news host Walter Blunt, it would be hard to recommend giving such a collection of clichés much of your time. However, Blunt Talk, which debuts August 22 on Starz, is more than that and worth going along for the ride."

TV Columnist Brian Lowry of Variety stated in his review: "The premiere starts with a rambunctious energy that temporarily promotes a sense of good will. Stewart’s Walter Blunt goes on a bender, sings rap and picks up a transgender prostitute. When the hooker politely asks if he’s troubled at all by who she is, he replies cheerfully, “No, I’m English.” The adventure ends fantastically badly, at least for Blunt's reputation. But from there, the series—which Ames produced with the seemingly ubiquitous Seth MacFarlane — pretty rapidly disintegrates, relying too heavily on Stewart's madcap antics and an assortment of not particularly distinctive supporting players, including Walter's sycophantic producers, Richard Lewis as his therapist and Romany Malco as the harried network boss."

The Guardian's Brian Moylan stated in his review: "Blunt Talk is an odd bird. It's sort of like if The Newsroom and Veep had a love child and it was raised by Nanny McPhee in the Royal Shakespeare Company. It takes a close look at cable news and the personalities and celebrity involved, but it's essentially about one man who is trying to change himself and do the right thing, but is incredibly bad at it. A crew as colorfully inept as Selina Meyer's also surrounds him, but they don't have the stinging bile of Veep's crew.

Mike Hale of The New York Times stated in his review: "It’s not accurate to say that Patrick Stewart hasn’t done comedy. He was funny playing himself as a poker-faced pervert in an episode of Extras, or dancing with Kelsey Grammer and telling him how sexy he looked in a tux on Frasier. And he’s lent his plummy voice to a raft of animated shows from Family Guy to Robot Chicken. But it’s fair to say that Blunt Talk, a new sitcom beginning on Saturday night on Starz, offers Patrick Stewart as we haven’t seen him before. Shuffling around an airport men’s room stall with his pants around his ankles, for instance, losing his patience as he tries unsuccessfully to cover the toilet seat, or gravely asking a transgender prostitute whether he can feed at her breasts."

=== Accolades ===
For the 73rd Golden Globe Awards, Patrick Stewart was nominated for Best Actor in a Television Series – Musical or Comedy.
