= Just Shoot Me! =

American sitcom (1997–2003)

- Genre: Sitcom
- Created by: Steven Levitan
- Starring: Laura San Giacomo; George Segal; Wendie Malick; Enrico Colantoni; Chris Hogan; David Spade; Rena Sofer; Brian Posehn
- Theme music composer: Korban Kraus; John Adair; Steve Hampton
- Ending theme: "Life Keeps Bringin' Me Back to You" (vocals by Lauren Wood)
- Composers: John Adair; Steve Hampton; Korbin Kraus
- Country of origin: United States
- Original language: English
- No. of seasons: 7
- No. of episodes: 145 (+ 3 episodes aired in syndication) (list of episodes)

Production
- Executive producers: Steven Levitan; Brad Grey; Bernie Brillstein (entire series); Marsh McCall; Don Woodard; Tom Maxwell (all; season 4); David Guarascio & Moses Port (seasons 5–6); Pamela Fryman (seasons 5–7); Judd Pillot & John Peaslee; Jon Pollack; Kevin C. Slattery (season 7)
- Camera setup: Videotape; Multi-camera
- Running time: approx. 22–23 minutes
- Production companies: Steven Levitan Productions; Brad Grey Television (Note: Credited as Brillstein-Grey Communications (1997–1998; seasons 1–2) and Brillstein-Grey Entertainment (1998–1999; seasons 3–4).); Universal Studios Network Programming (1999–2003; seasons 4–7); Sony Pictures Television (Note: Credited as Columbia Pictures Television (1997–1998; seasons 1–2), Columbia TriStar Television (1998–2001; seasons 3–6) and Columbia TriStar Domestic Television (2001–2002; seasons 6–7).)

Original release
- Network: NBC
- Release: March 4, 1997 – August 16, 2003
- Network: Syndication
- Release: November 24 – November 26, 2003

Just Shoot Me! is an American sitcom television series originally aired on NBC from March 4, 1997, to August 16, 2003, and later in syndication from November 24 to November 26, 2003, with a total of 145 half-hour episodes spanning seven seasons, including three episodes aired on syndication. The show, created by Steven Levitan, one of the show's executive producers, is set in the office of a fictional fashion magazine called Blush, comparable to the real-life magazine Vogue. The show's story revolves around several staff members at the magazine, including Jack Gallo, the owner and publisher; his daughter Maya, a writer for the magazine; secretary Finch; former model and now-fashion correspondent Nina; and photographer Elliot.

== Series history ==
Early on, the series was a very competitive hit, consistently winning its time slot. The first season of six episodes was all aired by NBC in a single month in March 1997. It was renewed for a 13-episode second season and fitted at 9:30 p.m. after Frasier, and then was moved in the spring to Thursdays between Friends and Seinfeld. After just two of these airings, the order was bumped up to a full season. When Seinfeld ended in 1998, Just Shoot Me! was one of the contenders to take the coveted 9:00 p.m. Thursday slot. Frasier instead won the slot, and Just Shoot Me! was instead given Frasier's 9:00 p.m. Tuesday slot.

The series' main cast, from left to right: Colantoni, Malick, Spade, San Giacomo, and Segal

Just Shoot Me! was never given a definitive time slot during its series run. The show ended up being moved around on the NBC schedule. It still retained good ratings, though; in its fourth season, it was the top-rated show for NBC Tuesday nights and had an average rating/share of 6.1/16 in the 18–49 demographic.

In March 2020, the cast reunited for a sketch on the late-night comedy program Lights Out with David Spade, which concerned a fictional reboot of the show. That June, the cast also reunited for a virtual reunion on Hulu's YouTube page.

=== Nielsen ratings ===
Season	Episodes	Timeslot (ET)	Season premiere	Season finale	TV Season	Rank	Viewers (in millions)
1	6	Tuesday 9:30; Wednesday 9:30	March 4, 1997	March 26, 1997	1996–1997	#64	8.10
2	25	Tuesday 9:30; Thursday 8:30	September 23, 1997	May 12, 1998	1997–1998	#12	11.66
3	25	Tuesday 9:00	September 22, 1998	May 25, 1999	1998–1999	#37	11.40
4	24	Tuesday 8:00; Tuesday 9:30	September 21, 1999	May 16, 2000	1999–2000	#53	11.70
5	22	Thursday 9:30	October 12, 2000	May 10, 2001	2000–2001	#19	15.61
6	22	Thursday 9:30	September 27, 2001	May 2, 2002	2001–2002	#20	14.40
7	24 (21 aired)	Tuesday 8:00; Tuesday 8:30; Saturday 8:00; Saturday 8:30	October 8, 2002	November 26, 2003	2002–2003	#107	6.39

== Cast ==
- Laura San Giacomo – Maya Gallo
- George Segal – Jack Gallo
- Wendie Malick – Nina Van Horn
- Enrico Colantoni – Elliot DiMauro
- Chris Hogan – Wally Dick (1997)
- David Spade – Dennis Finch
- Rena Sofer – Vicki Costa (2002–2003)
- Brian Posehn – Kevin Liotta

== Characters ==
=== Maya Gallo ===
The character of Maya Gallo is portrayed by Laura San Giacomo. In the pilot, Maya is largely characterised as a hot-tempered, sassy journalist who takes on a job at the fictional glamour fashion magazine Blush, owned by her father Jack Gallo, after she was fired for tampering with an anchorwoman's teleprompter and making her cry on the air. She is shown to have headstrong smarts despite her naïveté about life. Though she is seen as attractive and uses this if a situation calls for it, Maya frowns upon men looking at women solely as objects of sexual desire, and in keeping with her feminist views, instead encourages people to admire women for their intelligence or other attributes. However, this view puts her at odds with most of the magazine's staff, thereby providing much of the series' comedic conflict.

She is commonly mistaken for being Puerto Rican. Her birthday is January 1, but her father, Jack, cannot remember it. (Ep. "Sweet Charity").

Maya is often seen dating other characters on the show. She and Elliot are shown as a couple for quite some time, and they are briefly engaged. However, Elliot's fear of commitment causes him to instantly have a panic attack moments after he proposes to her. Among her other dates were Michael Tenzer (David Rasche), Chris (Dean Cain), Ray Liotta, and another man named Chris (Joe Rogan). Although she is involved in several relationships, she is never depicted getting legally married in the series. She is also very skilled at pitching; when she pitches a softball to Dennis Finch, he thinks his hand is broken. However, if Maya starts pitching, she can't stop.

=== Jack Gallo ===
The character of Jack Gallo, portrayed by George Segal, is the owner and publisher of Blush. During his daughter Maya's childhood, Jack was an absent workaholic. The relationship between the two of them develops throughout the series, reaching its pinnacle when he hands the magazine over to Maya in the series finale after retiring. When extolling the virtues of an assistant to Maya, he notes that an assistant (in his case, Finch) can even become one's "best friend," although the sentiment was slightly dulled by his use of the pronoun "it" to refer to the hypothetical assistant (and therefore to Finch).

Jack is four times divorced, although he was married to Maya's high school classmate Allie for the first half of the series. They have a daughter (Maya's half-sister) named Hannah who was born in the first episode, "Back Issues." Jack showers Hannah with affection, prompting Maya's jealousy. This resentment disappears when Jack explains that he does not want to repeat with Hannah the mistakes he made with Maya. Jack has a running contest with Donald Trump over who is, among other things, the smartest, the richest, and the best gift-giver.

In The Book of "Jack," Finch refers to Jack as 'Jackson Gilbert Gallo'; however, in "La Cage" Nina refers to Jack as 'Jackson H. Gallo'.

=== Nina Van Horn ===
The character of Nina Van Horn (born Claire Noodleman in Colby, Kansas in 1953), portrayed by Wendie Malick, is the fashion editor at Blush. As a teenager, she had a daughter (Cloe) whom she gave up for adoption. When reuniting with her and finding out Cloe has a teenage daughter (Tess) she is initially shocked, but later proudly accepts that she is a grandmother. She was a cover girl and movie star in the 1970s and 1980s. She found that when she retired, people forgot her as quickly as they knew her. In a special Biography program about her, Pat Sajak says that no one can guess her name, and the contestants are sent home. Her partying once caused her to die in 1986 (to which she responded, "it was only for 12 minutes, I'm obviously fine!"). At one point, she mentions that she slept with Mick Jagger, broke up music bands such as The Eagles and The Jackson 5, and toured with Iggy Pop.

Nina is considered an alcoholic partially due to her casual nips of alcohol during the day at work. Due to her former status as a supermodel, she has been plagued by an obsession to party all night long and return to work the following morning with a hangover. She is also, if no longer an addict, extremely experienced in recreational pharmacy with a wide knowledge of (and access to) uppers, downers, mood regulators, and hallucinogenic compounds (she can identify not only that a Chinese sweet "Lemon Wacky Hello" is a hallucinogen, but also its chemical make up, by taste alone). She is understood to be promiscuous and possibly bisexual.

Nina is obsessed with her age and looks. In one episode, she mentioned that she had the telephone number of a plastic surgeon on speed dial, and when her age is nearly revealed over the P.A., she runs into Jack's office to destroy the P.A. so nobody will know her age. Throughout the run of the show, she was vaguely in her late forties to early fifties, once blurting out that life's no fun at fifty (Ep. "Sid and Nina").

In most seasons, Nina often talks about her friend Binny Belmont (her full name is mentioned in the Season 3, Episode 3, “The Mask”; this is also her only appearance, although her face is shown covered in bandages). She is never seen but is heard about all the time. This usually leads to groans by other members of Blush who have to listen. In the episode "The Mask," Finch and Elliot try to prove Binny isn't real, only to find out she is real at the end. In the episode "Bye Bye Binny," we hear that Binny dies and Nina must face the fact that she lost her only friend. Binny appears as a ghost to Nina in "Strange Bedfellows," but her face is almost never shown. The exception is a black-and-white clip, when her face was partially bandaged after a facelift.

=== Elliot DiMauro ===
The character of Elliot DiMauro, portrayed by Enrico Colantoni, is the lead photographer for Blush who often dates the models. Elliot's backstory was that he was "discovered" by Jack while selling his photography on the street. He also dated Maya for a period of time. In one episode, he mentions that he is not allowed to vote in an election, when he spills that he was once arrested and spent time in jail. In season four, episode 2, it is revealed that he had planned to propose to a former girlfriend but as he was buying flowers, he was subsequently the victim of a hit-and-run; the driver turned out to be Nina. Though Elliot is angry at Nina for ruining his relationship, upon meeting his ex later, Elliot discovers that his ex-girlfriend had three husbands who died in accidents involving boats. Elliot has a brother (in the episode "Slow Donnie" among other episodes) named Donnie (played by David Cross).

=== Dennis Finch ===
The character of Dennis Quimby Finch, the executive assistant to Jack often referred to as simply "Finch", was portrayed by David Spade. Born in Albany, New York (of Norwegian ancestry), Dennis attended Hudson River Junior College where he joined the cheerleading team. Dennis' father and brother are both firemen and they have suspected that Dennis may have been gay due to his effeminacy.

In general, Finch has been described as "a self-centered horny pig who'd stop at nothing to get laid." He is discovered to be well endowed but does not realize this until Jack and Elliot bring it to his attention; they react with disgust when Finch says he always believed he was merely "a little above average" as he'd only seen other naked men in porn movies. Surreptitiously, Dennis writes articles for the "Dear Miss Pretty" advice column. Dennis used to compete in figure skating, as revealed in the season 3 episode, 'Softball'. Dennis also likes to collect action figures and ceramic kittens. He lives in an apartment, number 803, in New York City (Manhattan), which was formerly Maya's apartment before she moved in with Elliot.

He is also known to have a fear of owls from his mother's side, though, ironically, he is friends with Kevin, who kept a pet owl in their shared apartment. He works as the executive assistant of Blush owner Jack Gallo, toward whom he has a slavish devotion (he once claimed he expected to be buried with Jack) and with whom he has a virtually telepathic rapport, enabling him to foresee Gallo's every need and provide answers to even his vaguest questions (e.g. "What's that song that I like?"). He also has a seemingly mystical ability to tell when something sexual is happening or even being mentioned; for example, he was able to figure out that Maya and Elliot were in a relationship simply by mentally comparing Elliot's bite mark on an apple he was eating with a hickey on Maya's neck, as well as seemingly appearing to cross a massive distance across countries to appear in a room just as Maya was propositioned by a photographer. In season 4, he marries a supermodel, Adrienne (Rebecca Romijn), although she asks for a divorce in the same season.

Highly intelligent, as a child he was able to hack into a German bank and steal $18,000 worth of Deutsche Mark as disclosed in season 3; he also reveals in the season 2 episode "Jack's Old Partner" that he is so adept at twisting tax laws to favor him that the previous year, the IRS paid him $20,000 not to grow corn. In Season 6, episodes 2 and 3, it is discovered that his entire personality is stolen from a girl he saw at college on his first day at the freshmen mixer, Betsy Frayne (Amy Sedaris). This is revealed when she ends up working as a security guard for Blush.

=== Kevin Liotta ===
The character of Kevin Liotta, portrayed by Brian Posehn on a recurring basis, was the mail guy at Blush and in the show's sixth season is discovered to be a cousin of film actor Ray Liotta. He is known for having an obsessive crush on Nina Van Horn, which often disturbed her. However, in one episode he develops a brief crush on Maya, about which she becomes disturbed after initially thinking when he was still interested in Nina that she should give him a chance. He is also found to be a very good operatic singer, which Jack discovers. Kevin is impoverished and has crippling low self-esteem, both of which Jack once tried to help him overcome, without success. He only buys plain rice for every meal and keeps an owl as a pet, which he feeds on rice "in a different bag".

=== Vicki Costa ===
The character of Vicki Costa, portrayed by Rena Sofer, was hired by Jack and worked at Blush for part of the seventh and final season. Throughout her time on the show, she served as a creative consultant. She is not afraid to be honest with her coworkers and has proven to be tough when necessary. However, she was written out of the series midway through the last season with the character opting to resign from Blush.

=== Wally Dick ===
Wally, portrayed by Chris Hogan, is Maya's roommate in season 1.

== Writing staff ==
- Chris Aable
- Steven Levitan
- Marsh McCall
- Stephen Engel
- Andy Gordon & Eileen Conn
- Pam Brady
- Tom Martin
- Brian Reich
- Sivert Glarum & Michael Jamin
- Jack Burditt
- Don Woodard & Tom Maxwell
- Moses Port & David Guarascio
- Susan Dickes
- Tom Saunders & Kell Cahoon
- Jeff Lowell
- Bill Steinkellner

== Episodes ==
Season	Episodes	Originally released	
Season	Episodes	First released	Last released
1	6	March 4, 1997	March 26, 1997
2	25	September 23, 1997	May 12, 1998
3	25	September 22, 1998	May 25, 1999
4	24	September 21, 1999	May 16, 2000
5	22	October 12, 2000	May 10, 2001
6	22	September 27, 2001	May 2, 2002
7	24	October 8, 2002	November 26, 2003 (Note: Season 7 officially ended on August 16, 2003. Three episodes were syndicated during the last week of November 2003.)

== Syndication ==
=== International ===
Just Shoot Me! has aired in Australia on Network Ten (1998–2005), and GO! (a sub-channel of Nine) (2009–2011), on 7mate (2014) and 7flix (2016–present), and on pay-TV channel TV1.

In Serbia, the show initially aired on RTV Pink. Beginning in April 2011, reruns have been aired on B92.

In South Africa, the show initially aired on SABC3, free-to-air channel e.tv and rerun on satellite provider Sony Channel

== Home media ==
Sony Pictures Home Entertainment has released the first three seasons of Just Shoot Me! on DVD in Region 1. Season 3 was released on February 24, 2009.

On August 27, 2013, it was announced that Mill Creek Entertainment had acquired the rights to various television series from the Sony Pictures library including Just Shoot Me!. They subsequently re-released the first two seasons on DVD on January 21, 2014.

On May 5, 2017, it was announced that Shout! Factory had acquired the rights to the series from the Sony Pictures library and released Just Shoot Me! – The Complete Series on DVD in Region 1 on September 5, 2017.

DVD name	Ep #	Release date
The Complete 1st & 2nd Seasons	31	June 8, 2004; January 21, 2014 (re-release)
The Complete 3rd Season	25	February 24, 2009
The Complete 4th Season	24	N/A
The Complete 5th Season	22	N/A
The Complete 6th Season	22	N/A
The Complete 7th Season	24	N/A
The Complete Series	148	September 5, 2017

== Streaming ==
In 2020, the entire series became available to stream on Hulu.

== Cultural impact ==
The season 3 episode "Slow Donnie", guest starring David Cross, has been cited as an all-time great episode of a sitcom.
