= Devil's Workshop (film) =

American horror drama film

- Directed by: Chris von Hoffmann
- Written by: Chris von Hoffmann
- Starring: Radha Mitchell; Timothy Granaderos; Emile Hirsch
- Distributed by: Lionsgate
- Release date: September 30, 2022
- Running time: 86 minutes
- Country: United States
- Language: English

Devil's Workshop is a 2022 American horror drama film directed by Chris von Hoffmann and starring Radha Mitchell, Timothy Granaderos and Emile Hirsch.

== Plot ==
Struggling actor Clayton is so desperate to land a role as a demonologist that he spends a weekend with Eliza, a practitioner of the dark arts, to "become" the character. While his arrogant rival Donald prepares for the same audition by partying and being shallow, Clayton undergoes a series of grueling and increasingly violent rituals at Eliza’s secluded home. Eliza claims Clayton is haunted by internal demons that block his success, forcing him to endure blood sacrifices, branding, and psychological torture. The weekend culminates in a horrific twist where Eliza reveals her true demonic form by peeling away her human face; she then immolates herself, taking Clayton with her in a lethal fire. The film concludes with Donald bombing his audition, while the casting directors lament that Clayton, the man they actually wanted never showed up, unaware he has been sacrificed to the very forces he sought to portray.

== Cast ==
- Radha Mitchell as Eliza
- Timothy Granaderos as Clayton
- Emile Hirsch as Donald
- Sarah Coffey as Nikki
- Brooke Ramirez as Petra
- Chris von Hoffmann as Sean

== Release ==
The film was released in select theaters and on demand and digital on September 30, 2022. It was also released on DVD and Blu ray on November 8, 2022.

== Reception ==
The film has a 57% rating on Rotten Tomatoes based on seven reviews.
