= Maron (TV series) =

American sitcom

- Genre: Sitcom
- Created by: Marc Maron
- Starring: Marc Maron
- Theme music composer: Four on the Floor (Anthony Rizzo)
- Opening theme: "Poisoned Well"
- Country of origin: United States
- Original language: English
- No. of seasons: 4
- No. of episodes: 49 (list of episodes)

Production
- Executive producers: Marc Maron; Michael Jamin; Sivert Glarum; Denis Leary; Jim Serpico; Olivia Wingate; Duncan Birmingham
- Producers: Mark Grossman; Ed Tapia; Frank Mosca
- Cinematography: Joe Kessler; Christopher Walters
- Editors: Kyle Gilman; Casey Brown; Josh Drisko; Scott van Beever
- Camera setup: Single-camera
- Running time: 21–23 minutes
- Production companies: Boomer Lives! Productions; Apostle; Fox 21 Television Studios (Note: Credited as Fox Television Studios for first two seasons)

Original release
- Network: IFC
- Release: May 3, 2013 – July 13, 2016

Maron is an American sitcom created by and starring Marc Maron as a fictionalized version of himself. The series premiered on the American cable television network IFC on May 3, 2013. Maron, Denis Leary, Jim Serpico, Olivia Wingate, Sivert Glarum, Michael Jamin and Duncan Birmingham served as the show's executive producers. Glarum and Jamin were the showrunners. Maron's second season premiered on May 8, 2014, and its thirteen-episode third season premiered on May 14, 2015. In November 2015, the series was renewed for a thirteen-episode fourth season. In 2016 the show was nominated for the Writers Guild of America Award for Television: Episodic Comedy. On July 11, 2016, Maron announced on his WTF podcast that the series would not have a fifth season, with the season four finale serving as the series finale. The series finale aired on July 13, 2016.

== Cast and characters ==
- Marc Maron as a fictionalized version of himself

=== Supporting ===
- Josh Brener as Kyle, Marc's assistant
- Dave Anthony as himself, Marc's pathetic friend
- Andy Kindler as himself, Marc's other pathetic friend
- Lucy Davis as Emily, Marc's manager
- Nora Zehetner as Jen, Marc's girlfriend
- Sally Kellerman as Toni Maron, Marc's mother
- Judd Hirsch as Larry Maron, Marc's father
- Troy Ruptash as Josh Maron, Marc's brother
- Rick Shapiro as Bernie, Marc's eccentric neighbor

=== Guest ===
- Steve Agee as Himself
- Maria Bamford as Herself
- Nate Bargatze
- Peter Berman
- Phil "CM Punk" Brooks as Himself
- Bruce Bruce as Himself
- Bill Burr as Himself
- Louis C.K. as Himself
- Colt Cabana as Himself
- Wyatt Cenac as Himself
- Carly Chaikin as Tina
- David Cross as Himself
- Whitney Cummings as Herself
- Erin Daniels as Female Vet
- Dov Davidoff as Himself
- Lucy Davis as Emily
- Joey Diaz as Bobby Mendez
- Andy Dick as Himself
- Illeana Douglas as Herself
- Mark Duplass as Himself
- Dave Foley as Himself
- M. C. Gainey
- Jeff Garlin
- Ralph Garman as Pete (voice)
- Gina Gershon as Alexa
- Adam Goldberg as Jack Ross
- Bobcat Goldthwait as Himself
- Dana Gould
- Elliott Gould as Himself
- Chris Hardwick as Himself
- Rachael Harris as Herself
- Phil Hendrie as Bill Shepard (a fictionalized version of himself)
- Pete Holmes as Himself
- Ken Jeong as Himself
- Anthony Jeselnik as Himself
- Jackie Kashian
- Louise Kelly
- Robert Kelly as Repairman #3
- Johnny Knoxville as Himself
- David Koechner as Himself
- Jerry Lambert
- Ted Lange as Wise Stranger
- Denis Leary as Himself
- Drew Lynch as Adam
- Ken Marino as Himself
- Maribeth Monroe
- Seth Morris as Jeremy
- Tig Notaro as Sydney
- Conan O'Brien as Himself
- Patton Oswalt as Himself
- Brian Palermo
- Jimmy Pardo as Himself
- Eddie Pepitone as Stu Carbone
- Ron Perlman as Mel
- Drew Pinsky as Himself
- Aubrey Plaza as Herself
- Mary Lynn Rajskub as Herself
- Caroline Rhea as Herself
- Andy Richter as Himself
- Rob Riggle
- Ray Romano
- Adam Scott as Himself
- Sam Seder
- Sarah Silverman as Herself
- Ryan Singer as Himself
- Bobby Slayton as Himself
- Amy Smart
- Jerry Stahl as Himself
- Fred Stoller as Himself
- Eric Stoltz as Danny
- Sally Struthers as Shirley
- Danny Trejo as Manny
- Derek Waters
- Constance Zimmer as Lindsey

== Episodes ==
Season	Episodes	Originally aired	
Season	Episodes	First aired	Last aired
1	10	May 3, 2013	June 28, 2013
2	13	May 8, 2014	July 31, 2014
3	13	May 14, 2015	August 13, 2015
4	13	May 4, 2016	July 13, 2016
