= Melissa Tang =

American actress

- Education: Carnegie Mellon University (BFA)
- Occupation: Actress
- Years active: 2006–present

Melissa Tang is an American actress.

== Early life and education ==
She graduated with a BFA in acting from Carnegie Mellon University in 2007.

== Career ==
She has guest starred in The Big Bang Theory, Mom, The Unit, Lie to Me, CSI: Crime Scene Investigation, Harry's Law, Good Luck Charlie, New Girl and Baby Daddy. She has also appeared in the films Beginners (2010) and the internet film Inside (2011).

She co-starred as April Cho in the Fox sitcom The Goodwin Games, which premiered in May 2013.

== Filmography ==
Year	Title	Role	Notes
2006	The Routes of Wild Flowers	Contestant #1	
2008	Man Stroke Woman	Various characters	TV film
2008	The Unit	Anna	Episode: "Sacrifice"
2009	Lie to Me	Young Woman	Episode: "Blinded"
2009	Post Grad	College Friend #1	
2010	CSI: Crime Scene Investigation	Erin Nagano	Episode: "Long Ball"
2010	Beginners	Liz	
2010	My Freakin' Family	Llewelyn	Unsold TV pilot
2011	Inside	Jennifer Myer	
2011	Harry's Law	Marnie Russert	Episode: "Head Games"
2012	New Girl	Jenn	Episode: "Backslide"
2012	Good Luck Charlie	Rita	Episode: "Special Delivery"
2012	Baby Daddy	Katie	Episode: "Something Borrowed, Something Ben"
2013	The Goodwin Games	April Cho	Series regular
2013	A Good Day To Die Hard	Lucas	
2013	How I Met Your Mother	Amanda	Episode: "The Broken Code"
2014	Mom	Suzanne Taylor	4 episodes
2015	The Big Bang Theory	Mandy Chao	Episode: "The Separation Oscillation"
2017	Young Sheldon	Ms. Fenley	Recurring role
2018–2019, 2021	The Kominsky Method	Margaret	Recurring role
2020	Hawaii Five-0	Erin Hong	Hawaii Five-0 and Magnum P.I. crossover event
2020	Magnum P.I.	Erin Hong	Hawaii Five-0 and Magnum P.I. crossover event
2022	Who Invited Them	Margo	
