= Timothy Granaderos =

American actor and model (born 1986)

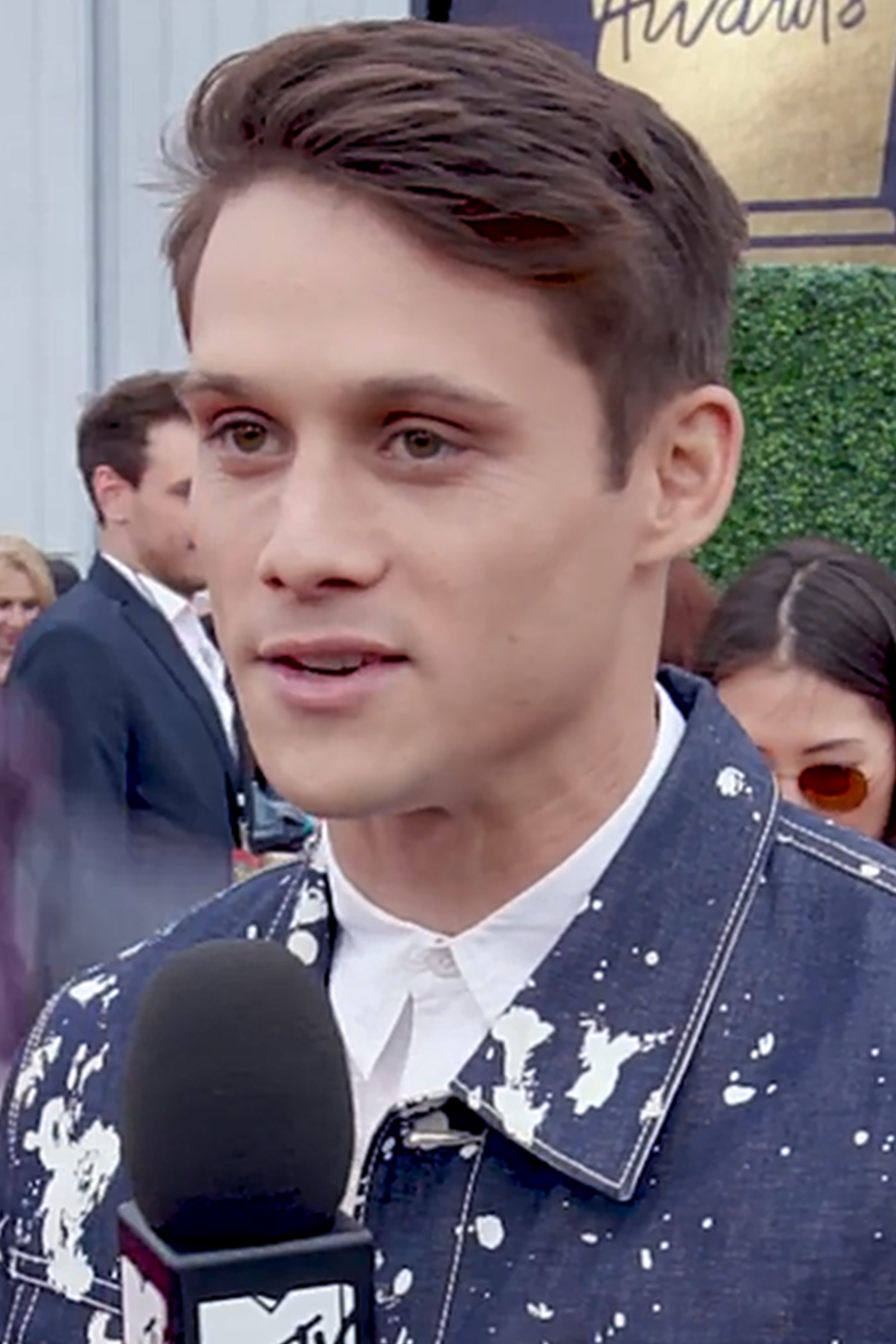
- Granaderos in 2018
- Born: September 9, 1986 (age 39); Ypsilanti, Michigan, U.S.
- Education: Michigan State University
- Occupations: Actor; model
- Years active: 2013–present
- Height: 5 ft 11 in (180 cm)

Timothy Granaderos (born September 9, 1986) is an American actor and model. He is known for his portrayals of Ash Franklin in the thriller web series Tagged (2016–18), Taylor Price in the TV series In the Vault (2017), and Montgomery de la Cruz in the Netflix teen drama series 13 Reasons Why (2017–20).

== Early life and education ==
Granaderos was born in Ypsilanti, Michigan, and raised in Portage, Michigan. He later moved to Los Angeles to pursue modeling and acting. Granaderos is half Filipino. His father is a Filipino of the Chavacano ethnic group from Zamboanga admixture. Granaderos graduated from Portage Northern High School and later attended Michigan State University, where he majored in advertising and played on the Michigan State Spartans men's soccer team.

== Career ==
=== Acting ===
Before beginning his acting career, he worked as a production assistant on the short film Committed. In 2016, he played Ash Franklin in the web series Tagged. He also appeared in the TV show In the Vault as Taylor Price.

Granaderos made recurring appearances in the first two seasons of 13 Reasons Why. He was promoted to series regular for season 3. Granaderos had originally auditioned for the roles of Justin Foley, Tony Padilla and Jeff Atkins, before being cast as Montgomery De La Cruz.

He was represented by Silver Mass Entertainment and AKA Talent Agency.

=== Modeling ===
Granaderos is represented by One Management, and appeared in various commercials and print ads. He also supported and modeled for a clothing company called "hnly".

== Filmography ==
=== Film ===
Year	Title	Role	Notes
2015	Killing Animals	Nick Dobbs	
2015	We Are Your Friends	Preppy Guy # 1	
2016	The Standoff	Jack Guthrie	
2017	The Archer	Daniel	
2020	Keep Hope Alive	Hank Alvaro	
2021	Untitled Horror Movie	Kip	Also executive producer
2021	Plan B	Xander	
2022	Who Invited Them	Tom	
2022	Devil's Workshop	Clayton	
2024	Good Bad Things	Marco	
2026	The Remedy	Jason	
TBA	The Sacrifice	Mike	

=== Television ===
Year	Title	Role	Notes
2013	Lab Rats	Griffin	Episode: "Llama Drama"
2014	CSI: Crime Scene Investigation	Teen Boy	Episode: "De Los Muertos"
2014	Liv and Maddie	Mailman	Episode: "Flashback-A-Rooney"
2015	Undateable	Jake	Episode: "Candace's Boyfriend Walks Into a Bar"
2015	Studio City	Mateo	Television film
2015	Chasing Life	Gabe	Episodes: "Truly Madly Deeply", "The Last W"
2016	Rosewood	Lane Piven	Episode: "Forward Motion & Frat Life"
2016–18	Tagged	Ash Franklin	Seasons 1–3 (main), web series; 28 episodes
2017	The Twin	Derek / Tyler	Television film
2017	In the Vault	Taylor Price	Season 1 (main), 8 episodes
2017, 2019	Runaways	Lucas	Episodes: "Reunion", "Fifteen", "Cheat the Gallows"
2017–20	13 Reasons Why	Montgomery "Monty" de la Cruz	Seasons 1–2 (recurring), seasons 3–4 (main); 43 episodes
2018	How May We Hate You?		Television film
2019	Betch	Tim	Episode: "I think I'm just gonna have to play all the lesbians"
2020	Room 104	Hunter	Episode: "Foam Party"
2021	The Sex Lives of College Girls	Hayden	Episode: "That Comment Tho"
2022	Buried in Barstow	Travis	Television film
2023	Walker: Independence	Shane	5 episodes
2024	S.W.A.T.	Jeb Webber	Episode: "Family Man"

=== Music videos ===
Year	Artist	Title
2011	Selena Gomez & the Scene	"Love You like a Love Song"
2015	Tamara Laurel	"Whiskey"
2017	Fall Out Boy	"Champion"
