= Michael Jamin =

American television writer and producer

- Education: Princeton University
- Occupations: Television producer; screenwriter
- Years active: 1995–present
- Website: michaeljamin.com

Michael Jamin is an American television writer and producer, known for his work on shows such as Just Shoot Me, King of the Hill, Wilfred, and Maron.

== Early life and education ==
Jamin grew up in a Jewish family. he attended Princeton University, graduating in 1992. While there, he performed stand-up comedy at various campus venues and wrote his senior thesis on the evolution of the sitcom. Jamin graduated with a degree in English Literature, concentrating in the plays of William Shakespeare. In later life he would explain self-deprecatingly that he had applied to the creative writing program but had been rejected on the basis that his writing was not strong enough.

== Career ==
After graduating from Princeton, Jamin moved to Los Angeles to pursue a career in television writing. Early on, he worked as a production assistant on several film and television shows. He also wrote infomercials for Dionne Warwick's Psychic Friends Network.

In 1996, Jamin and his writing partner Sivert Glarum were hired as staff writers on the NBC sitcom Just Shoot Me. They worked on the show for four seasons, writing episodes and serving as executive story editors.

After leaving Just Shoot Me in 2000, Jamin joined the writing staff of the animated series King of the Hill on Fox. He remained on the show through 2006, earning an Emmy nomination in 2002.

Throughout the 2000s and 2010s, Jamin worked as a writer and producer on shows like Rules of Engagement, Wilfred, Maron, Lopez, Mystery Girls, and Brickleberry.

When production slowed during the COVID-19 pandemic, Jamin turned to social media, building a large following for his screenwriting tips on TikTok and Instagram.

In 2022, Jamin wrote and performed a one-man show A Paper Orchestra. The show premiered in Los Angeles before touring. In February 2024 he published a collection of short autobiographical stories in a book titled A Paper Orchestra, based on the aforementioned show.

As a member of the Writers Guild of America (WGA) with a strong social media presence, Jamin is often asked to speak publicly about his experience as a professional screenwriter.

== Personal life ==
Jamin is married to actress Cynthia Mann.

== Filmography ==
=== Television production ===
Year	Title	Position	Notes
1995	Lois & Clark: The New Adventures of Superman	Writer	Episode: "Chip Off the Old Clark" (no. 52)
1997–2000	Just Shoot Me!	Producer	36 episodes
1997–2000	Just Shoot Me!	Writer	42 episodes
2001–2006	King of the Hill	Producer	58 episodes
2001–2006	King of the Hill	Writer	8 episodes
2005–2006	Out of Practice	Producer	21 episodes
2005–2006	Out of Practice	Writer	5 episodes
2007–2008	Rules of Engagement	Producer	15 episodes
2007–2008	Rules of Engagement	Writer	2 episodes
2009–2011	Glenn Martin DDS	Producer	38 episodes
2009–2011	Glenn Martin DDS	Writer	2 episodes
2011	Wilfred	Producer	12 episodes
2011	Wilfred	Writer	2 episodes
2011	Beavis and Butt-Head	Writer	2 episodes
2012	Brickleberry	Producer	9 episodes
2012	Brickleberry	Writer	4 episodes
2013–2016	Maron	Producer	49 episodes
2013–2016	Maron	Writer	12 episodes
2013–2016	Maron	Director	Episode: "The Request" (no. 25)
2014	Mystery Girls	Producer	7 episodes
2014	Mystery Girls	Writer	2 episodes
2015	Gigi Does It	Producer	8 episodes
2017	Lopez	Producer	12 episodes
2017	Lopez	Writer	2 episodes
2017	Rhett & Link's Buddy System	Producer	8 episodes
2017	Rhett & Link's Buddy System	Writer	2 episodes
2019–2023	Tacoma FD	Producer	28 episodes
2019–2023	Tacoma FD	Writer	8 episodes

=== Acting ===
Year	Title	Role	Notes
2007	Glenn Martin, DDS		Voice; episode: "Deck the Malls" (no. 12)
2009	King of the Hill	Carolyn	Voice; episode: "The Peggy Horror Picture Show" (no. 202)
