= List of horror films of 2022 =

This is a list of horror films that were released in 2022. This list includes films that are classified as horror as well as other subgenres.

== Highest-grossing horror films of 2022 ==
Highest-grossing horror films of 2022
Rank	Title	Distributor	Worldwide gross
1	Doctor Strange in the Multiverse of Madness	Walt Disney Studios Motion Pictures	$955.8 million
2	Smile	Paramount Pictures	$217.4 million
3	M3GAN	Universal Pictures	$181.8 million
4	Nope	Universal Pictures	$171.1 million
5	Morbius	Sony Pictures Releasing	$167.5 million
6	Scream	Paramount Pictures	$138.9 million
7	Halloween Ends	Universal Pictures	$105.4 million
8	Talk to Me	Maslow Entertainment / Umbrella Entertainment / Ahi Films	$92 million
9	Don't Worry Darling	Warner Bros. Pictures	$87.6 million
10	The Menu	Searchlight Pictures	$79.6 million

== 2022 horror films ==
Horror films released in 2022
A Party to Die For	Nanea Miyata	Jonetta Kaiser, Kara Royster, Jermaine Rivers	United States	Horror Thriller
A Town Full of Ghosts	Isaac Rodriguez	Andrew C. Fisher, Mandy Lee Rubio, Sarah Froelich, Keekee Suki, Ali Alkhafaji, Lauren Lox, Mike Dell	United States	Found footage horror
A Wounded Fawn	Travis Stevens	Josh Ruben, Malin Barr, Sarah Lind	United States	Horror
Abandoned	Spencer Squire	Emma Roberts, John Gallagher Jr., Michael Shannon	United States	Horror
All Eyes	Todd Greenlee	Jasper Hammer, Ben Hall, Danielle Evon Ploeger, Nick Ballard, Skyler Davenport	United States	Horror Comedy
Allegoria	Spider One	Krsy Fox, John Ennis, Bryce Johnson, Edward Hong, Adam Busch, Adam Marcinowski	United States	Horror Anthology
Alone at Night	Jimmy Giannopoulos	Ashley Benson, Jon Foster, Sky Ferreira, Jake Weary, Duke Nicholson	United States	Horror Thriller
Alone in the Dark	Brant Daugherty	Novi Brown, Terrell Carter, Kimberly Daugherty, Christopher Bencomo	United States	Horror Thriller
American Carnage	Diego Hallivis	Jorge Lendeborg Jr., Jenna Ortega, Eric Dane	United States	Comedy, Horror
Among the Living	Rob Worsey	Dean Michael Gregory, George Newton, Melissa Worsey, Leon Worsey, Emily Rose Holt, Alexander King, Gary Stead	United Kingdom	Horror drama
Bad Girl Boogey	Alice Maio Mackay	Lisa Fanto, Prudence Cassar, Steven Nguyen, Toshiro Glenn	Australia	Drama Horror Slasher
Bahay na Pula	Brillante Mendoza	Julia Barretto, Xian Lim, Marco Gumabao	Philippines	Horror
Barbarian	Zach Cregger	Georgina Campbell, Bill Skarsgård, Justin Long	United States	Horror-thriller
Beast	Baltasar Kormákur	Idris Elba, Iyana Halley, Leah Jeffries, Sharlto Copley	Iceland, South Africa, United States	Survival Action Monster Thriller
Bed Rest	Lori Evans Taylor	Melissa Barrera, Guy Burnet	United States	Supernatural horror thriller
Bhediya	Amar Kaushik	Varun Dhawan, Kriti Sanon, Deepak Dobriyal, Abhishek Banerjee	India	Comedy, horror
Bhool Bhulaiyaa 2	Anees Bazmee	Kartik Aaryan, Tabu, Kiara Advani	India	Comedy horror
Bitch Ass	Bill Posley	Tony Todd, Sheaun McKinney, Tunde Laleye, A-F-R-O	United States	Crime Horror Slasher
Blood	Brad Anderson	Michelle Monaghan, Skeet Ulrich, Finlay Wojtak-Hissong, June B. Wilde	United States	Vampire Horror
Bodies Bodies Bodies	Halina Reijn	Amandla Stenberg, Pete Davidson, Maria Bakalova	United States	Black comedy, Slasher
Bones and All	Luca Guadagnino	Taylor Russell, Timothée Chalamet	United States, Italy	Romantic Horror Cannibal
Bring It On: Cheer or Die	Karen Lam	Kerri Medders, Tiera Skovbye, Missi Pyle	United States	Slasher Comedy
ChadGetsTheAxe	Travis Bible	Spencer Harrison Levin, Michael Bonini, Taneisha Figueroa, Cameron Vitosh	United States	Horror
Choose or Die	Toby Meakins	Asa Butterfield	United Kingdom	Drama Horror Thriller
Christmas Bloody Christmas	Joe Begos	Riley Dandy, Sam Delich, Jonah Ray, Dora Madison Burge, Jeremy Gardner, Jeff Daniel Phillips, Abraham Benrubi	United States	Christmas-theme Slasher Horror
Cocaine Crabs from Outer Space	Chuck Magee	Chuck Magee, Kat Andrews, Brent G. Baker, Douglass Hoffman, Bo Bolin	United States	Comedy horror
Crimes of the Future	David Cronenberg	Viggo Mortensen, Léa Seydoux, Kristen Stewart, Scott Speedman	Canada, France, United Kingdom, Greece	Science Fiction Body horror Drama
Cryptid	Brad Rego	Ellen Adair, Kate MacCluggage, Kevin O'Rourke, Nicholas Baroudi	United States	Horror
Dampyr	Riccardo Chemello	Wade Briggs, Stuart Martin, Frida Gustavsson, Sebastian Croft, Luke Roberts, David Morrissey	Italy	Fantasy Horror
Dark Glasses	Dario Argento	Ilenia Pastorelli, Asia Argento	Italy, France	Giallo
Dawn Breaks Behind the Eyes	Kevin Kopacka	Jeff Wilbusch, Anna Platen	Germany	Gothic Horror
Day Shift	J. J. Perry	Jamie Foxx, Dave Franco, Snoop Dogg, Natasha Liu Bordizzo, Meagan Good, Karla Souza, Steve Howey, Scott Adkins	United States	Vampire Action Horror Comedy
Deadstream	Vanessa Winter, Joseph Winter	Joseph Winter, Melanie Stone	United States	Found footage Techno-horror Comedy
Deleter	Mikhail Red	Nadine Lustre, Louise delos Reyes, McCoy de Leon, Jeffrey Hidalgo	Philippines	Techno Horror
Devil's Workshop	Chris von Hoffmann	Radha Mitchell, Timothy Granaderos, Emile Hirsch	United States	Horror Drama
Dig	K. Asher Levin	Thomas Jane, Harlow Jane, Emile Hirsch, Liana Liberato	United States	Thriller
Doctor Strange in the Multiverse of Madness	Sam Raimi	Benedict Cumberbatch, Elizabeth Olsen, Xóchitl Gomez	United States	Superhero horror
Don't Worry Darling	Olivia Wilde	Florence Pugh, Harry Styles, Olivia Wilde, Gemma Chan, KiKi Layne, Nick Kroll, Chris Pine	United States	Psychological thriller
Everybody Dies by the End	Ryan Schafer, Ian Tripp	Vinny Curran, Bill Oberst Jr., Brendan Cahalan, Iliyana Apostolova, Ian Tripp, Joshua Wyble, Ryan Schafer, Caroline Amiguet, Paul Fisher III, Alan Vazquez	United States	Comedy horror
Flowing	Paolo Strippoli	Fabrizio Rongione, Cristiana Dell'Anna, Francesco Gheghi, Leon de la Vallée, Ondina Quadri, Orso Maria Guerrini	Italy, Belgium	Horror
Fresh	Mimi Cave	Sebastian Stan, Daisy Edgar-Jones, Charlotte Le Bon, Brett Dier, Andrea Bang, Jonica T. Gibbs, Dako Okeniyi, William Belleau, Lachlan Quarmby	United States	Comedy thriller
Firestarter	Keith Thomas	Zac Efron, Sydney Lemmon, Ryan Kiera Armstrong, Michael Greyeyes, Gloria Reuben	United States	Supernatural horror
Gatlopp: Hell of a Game	Alberto Belli	Emmy Raver-Lampman, Jim Mahoney, Jon Bass, Sarunas J. Jackson	United States	Comedy horror
Glorious	Rebekah McKendry	Ryan Kwanten, J. K. Simmons	United States	Comedy Horror
Goodnight Mommy	Matt Sobel	Joshua Astrachan, Nicolas Brigaud-Robert, V.J. Guibal, David Kaplan, Naomi Watts	United States	Psychological horror
Grimcutty	John Ross	Sara Wolfkind, Shannyn Sossamon, Usman Ally, Callan Farris	United States	Monster Horror
Halloween Ends	David Gordon Green	Jamie Lee Curtis, Andi Matichak, Kyle Richards, Nancy Stephens, Charles Cyphers	United States	Slasher
Hatching	Hanna Bergholm	Siiri Solalinna, Sophia Heikkilä, Jani Volanen	Finland	Body horror
He's Watching	Jacob Aaron Estes	Iris Serena Estes, Lucas Steel Estes	United States	Found Footage Horror
Hellblazers	Justin Lee	Bruce Dern, Billy Zane, Tony Todd, Adrienne Barbeau	United States	Action Horror
Hellhole	Bartosz M. Kowalski	Piotr Zurawski, Olaf Lubaszenko, Sebastian Stankiewicz	Poland	Horror Mystery
Hellraiser	David Bruckner	Odessa A'zion, Jamie Clayton	United States	Supernatural horror
Hocus Pocus 2	Anne Fletcher	Bette Midler, Sarah Jessica Parker, Kathy Najimy, Sam Richardson, Doug Jones, Whitney Peak, Belissa Escobedo, Tony Hale, Hannah Waddingham	United States	Horror Fantasy Family Comedy
HollyBlood	Jesús Font	Óscar Casas, Isa Montalbán, Jordi Sánchez	Spain	Teen Romantic Comedy horror
Hounded	Tommy Boulding	Samantha Bond, Malachi Pullar-Latchman, James Lance, Hannah Traylen, Nick Moran	United Kingdom	Action Horror Thriller
House of Darkness	Neil LaBute	Justin Long, Kate Bosworth, Gia Crovatin, Lucy Walters	United States	Vampire Black comedy Horror Thriller
Huesera: The Bone Woman	Michelle Garza Cervera	Natalia Solián, Alfonso Dosal, Mayra Batalla, Mercedes Hernández, Sonia Couoh, Aida López	Mexico, Peru	Supernatural Body horror
Huling Lamay	Joven Tan	Marlo Mortel, Buboy Villar, Lou Veloso, Mira Aquino, Waki Cacho	Philippines	Independent Horror
Hypochondriac	Addison Heimann	Zach Villa, Devon Graye, Madeline Zima, Yumarie Morales	United States	Drama Horror Thriller
Incantation	Kevin Ko	Tsai Hsuan-yen, Huang Sin-ting, Kao Ying-hsuan, Sean Lin	Taiwan	Found Footage Supernatural horror
Influencer	Kurtis David Harder	Emily Tennant, Cassandra Naud, Rory J. Saper, Sara Canning	United States	Psychological horror
In the Forest	Hector Barron	Debbon Ayer, Lyman Ward, Cristina Spruell, Mathew Thomas Odette, Don Baldaramos, Sharon Sharth, Time Winters and Kaitlyn Dias	United States	Horror-thriller
Ivanna	Kimo Stamboel	Caitlin Halderman, Jovarel Callum, Junior Roberts, Shandy William	Indonesia	Horror slasher
Jaula	Ignacio Tatay	Elena Anaya, Pablo Molinero, Eva Tennear, Carlos Santos, Eva Llorach, Eloy Azorín, Esther Acebo	Spain	Horror thriller
Jeepers Creepers: Reborn	Timo Vuorensola	Sydney Craven, Imran Adams, Dee Wallace, Gary Graham, Jodie McMullen	United States, United Kingdom, Finland	Supernatural Horror Slasher
Kaatteri	Deekay	Vaibhav Reddy, Sonam Bajwa, Varalaxmi Sarathkumar, Aathmika	India	Horror Comedy
Killer Book Club	Carlos Alonso Ojea	Veki Velilla, Iván Pellicer, Álvaro Mel, Daniel Grao	Spain	Slasher Horror Thriller
KillRoy Was Here	Kevin Smith	Azita Ghanizada, Ryan O'Nan, Harley Quinn Smith, Chris Jericho, Justin Kucsulain	United States	Horror anthology
Lullaby	John R. Leonetti	Oona Chaplin, Ramón Rodríguez, Liane Balaban, MaryAnne Stevens, Julie Khaner, Alex Karzis	United States, Canada	Horror
Margaux	Steven C. Miller	Madison Pettis, Vanessa Morgan, Jedidiah Goodacre, Phoebe Miu, Richard Harmon	United States	Horror Thriller
Master	Mariama Diallo	Regina Hall, Nike Kadri, Zoe Renee, Amber Gray, Molly Bernard	United States	Psychological Horror thriller
Matriarch	Ben Steiner	Jemima Rooper, Kate Dickie, Sarah Paul, Simon Meacock	United States	Horror
M3GAN	Gerard Johnstone	Allison Williams, Ronny Chieng	United States	Sci-fi horror thriller
Men	Alex Garland	Jessie Buckley, Rory Kinnear, Paapa Essiedu	United Kingdom	Horror drama, Folk horror
Mid-Century	Sonja O'Hara	Stephen Lang, Shane West, Bruce Dern	United States	Horror Thriller
Monolith	Matt Vesely	Lily Sullivan (on screen); Erik Thomson, Kate Box, Terence Crawford, Damon Herriman, (voices)	Australia	Sci-fi horror thriller
Monstrous	Chris Sivertson	Christina Ricci, Colleen Camp, Lew Temple, Nick Vallelonga, Santino Barnard	United States	Supernatural Thriller
Morbius	Daniel Espinosa	Jared Leto, Matt Smith, Adria Arjona, Jared Harris, Al Madrigal, Tyrese Gibson	United States	Superhero Vampire Horror
Murmur	Mark Polish	Logan Polish, Colin Ford, Cyrus Arnold, Johnny Jay Lee, Megan Lee, Brandon Wilson, D.W. Moffett	United States	
Mr. Harrigan's Phone	John Lee Hancock	Jaeden Martell, Donald Sutherland	United States	Horror-thriller
My Best Friend's Exorcism	Damon Thomas	Elsie Fisher, Amiah Miller, Rachel Ogechi Kanu, Cathy Ang, Clayton Royal Johnson, Cynthia Evans, Chris Lowell	United States	Supernatural Comedy horror
Nanahimik ang Gabi	Shugo Praico	Ian Veneracion, Heaven Peralejo, Mon Confiado	Philippines	suspense thriller
Nanny	Nikyatu Jusu	Anna Diop, Michelle Monaghan, Sinqua Walls, Morgan Spector, Rose Decker, Leslie Uggams	United States	Horror-thriller
Night's End	Jennifer Reeder	Geno Walker, Kate Arrington, Felonious Munk, Lawrence Grimm	United States	Horror
No Exit	Damien Power	Havana Rose Liu, Danny Ramirez	United States	Thriller
Nocebo	Lorcan Finnegan	Eva Green, Chai Fonacier, Mark Strong, Billie Gadsdon, Anthony Falcon, Cathy Belton	Ireland, Philippines	Psychological Horror Thriller
Nope	Jordan Peele	Daniel Kaluuya	United States	Sci-fi
Old Man	Lucky McKee	Marc Senter, Stephen Lang, Liana Wright-Mark, Patch Darragh	United States	Horror Thriller
Old People	Andy Fetscher	Jolene Anderson, Adolfo Assor, Betsy Baker, Louie Betton	Germany	Elderly Theme Horror
Orphan: First Kill	William Brent Bell	Isabelle Fuhrman, Julia Stiles, Rossif Sutherland	United States	Psychological horror Slasher
Pearl	Ti West	Mia Goth, David Corenswet, Tandi Wright	United States	Slasher, Psychological Horror
Phone Bhoot	Gurmmeet Singh	Katrina Kaif, Ishaan Khatter, Siddhant Chaturvedi	India	Supernatural Comedy
Piggy	Carlota Pereda	Laura Galán, Richard Holmes	Spain, France	Horror thriller
Play Dead	Patrick Lussier	Bailee Madison, Jerry O'Connell	United States	Horror Thriller
Prey	Dan Trachtenberg	Amber Midthunder, Dane DiLiegro	United States	Sci-fi, Action
Prey for the Devil	Daniel Stamm	Jacqueline Byers, Colin Salmon, Christian Navarro, Lisa Palfrey, Nicholas Ralph, Ben Cross, Virginia Madsen	United States	Supernatural horror
Project Legion	Lance Kawas	Brande Roderick, Donald Cerrone, Kelly Lynn Reiter, Christopher Maher	United States	Science fiction Horror Thriller
Qodrat	Charles Gozali	Vino G Bastian, Marsha Timothy, Randy Pangalila	Indonesia	Religious, Horror, Action
Qorin	Ginanti Rona	Zulfa Maharani, Omar Daniel, Aghniny Haque, Dea Annisa	Indonesia	Horror Thriller Mystery
Resurrection	Andrew Semans	Rebecca Hall, Grace Kaufman, Michael Esper, Tim Roth	United States	Psychological thriller
Rooftop	Yam Laranas	Ryza Cenon, Marco Gumabao, Ella Cruz, Marco Gallo, Epy Quizon, Allan Paule	Philippines	Horror
Room 203	Ben Jagger	Francesca Xuereb, Viktoria Vinyarska, Eric Wiegand, Scott Gremillion	United States	Horror
Sabel Is Still Young	Brillante Mendoza	Micaella Raz, Julio Diaz, JC Tan, Benz Sangalang, Rash Flores	Philippines	Crime Horror
Sadako DX	Hisashi Kimura	Fuka Koshiba, Kazuma Kawamura, Mario Kuroba	Japan	Supernatural, Comedy horror
Satan's Slaves 2: Communion	Joko Anwar	Tara Basro, Bront Palarae, Ratu Felisha	Indonesia	Supernatural horror
Scream	Tyler Gillett, Matt Bettinelli-Olpin	David Arquette, Neve Campbell, Courteney Cox, Marley Shelton	United States	Slasher
Shark Bait	James Nunn	Holly Earl, Jack Trueman, Catherine Hannay, Malachi Pullar-Latchman	Malta, United Kingdom	Survival Horror
She Came from the Woods	Erik Bloomquist	Cara Buono, Clare Foley, Spencer List, Michael Park, William Sadler	United States	Horror
Shut In	D.J. Caruso	Rainey Qualley, Jake Horowitz, Luciana VanDette, Vincent Gallo	United States	Thriller
Sick	John Hyams	Gideon Adlon, Bethlehem Million	United States	Slasher
Sissy	Hannah Barlow, Kane Senes	Aisha Dee, Hannah Barlow, Emily De Margheriti, Daniel Monks, Yerin Ha	Australia	Independent Horror Slasher
Skinamarink	Kyle Edward Ball	Lucas Paul, Dali Rose Tetreault, Ross Paul, Jaime Hill	Canada	Experimental
Slayers	K. Asher Levin	Thomas Jane, Kara Hayward, Jack Donnelly, Lydia Hearst, Malin Akerman, Abigail Breslin	United States	Comedy horror
Smile	Parker Finn	Sosie Bacon, Jessie T. Usher, Kyle Gallner, Caitlin Stasey, Kal Penn, Rob Morgan	United States	Psychological horror
Soft & Quiet	Beth de Araújo	Stefanie Estes, Olivia Luccardi	United States	Horror Thriller
Something in the Dirt	Justin Benson, Aaron Moorhead	Justin Benson, Aaron Moorhead	United States	Science fiction Comedy horror
Speak No Evil	Christian Tafdrup	Morten Burian, Sidsel Siem Koch, Fedja van Huêt, Karina Smulders, Liva Forsberg, Marius Damslev	Denmark	Psychological thriller horror drama
Spirited	Ruben Adrian	Ari Irham, Oka Antara, Cinta Laura	Indonesia	Horror
Student Body	Lee Ann Kurr	Christian Camargo, Montse Hernandez, Cheyenne Haynes, Anthony Keyvan, Harley Quinn Smith, Austin Zajur	United States	Horror Thriller
Studio 666	B. J. McDonnell	Dave Grohl, Taylor Hawkins	United States	Comedy horror
Swallowed	Carter Smith	Cooper Koch, Jose Colon, Jena Malone, Mark Patton	United States	Independent Body horror
Tainted Soul	Ginanti Rona	Emir Mahira, Zee JKT48, Andrew Barret, Angel Sianturi	Indonesia	Horror
Tales from the Occult	Fruit Chan, Chi-Keung Fung, Wesley Hoi Ip Sang	Charm Man Chan, Lawrence Cheng, Richie Jen, Kelvin Kwan, Jerry Lamb	Hong Kong	Horror Thriller
Talk to Me	Danny and Michael Philippou	Sophie Wilde, Alexandra Jensen, Joe Bird, Miranda Otto, Otis Dhanji, Zoe Terakes, Chris Alosio, Marcus Johnson, Alexandria Steffensen	Australia	Supernatural Horror
Terrifier 2	Damien Leone	Lauren LaVera, Elliot Fullam, Sarah Voight, Chris Jericho, Samantha Scaffidi, David Howard Thornton	United States	Slasher
Terror Train	Philippe Gagnon	Mary Walsh, Robyn Alomar, Nadine Bhabha	United States	Slasher
Terror Train 2	Philippe Gagnon	Robyn Alomar, Nadine Bhabha, Nia Roam, Romy Weltman	United States	Slasher
Texas Chainsaw Massacre	David Blue Garcia	Nell Hudson, Elsie Fisher, Jacob Latimore, Moe Dunford	United States	Slasher
The Accursed	Kevin Lewis	Sarah Grey, Meg Foster, Sarah Dumont, Mena Suvari, Alexis Knapp	United States	Horror
The Blackening	Tim Story	Grace Byers, Jermaine Fowler, Melvin Gregg, X Mayo, Dewayne Perkins, Antoinette Robertson, Sinqua Walls, Jay Pharoah, Yvonne Orji, Diedrich Bader	United States	Horror comedy
The Cellar	Brendan Muldowney	Elisha Cuthbert, Eoin Macken, Dylan Fitzmaurice Brady, Tara Lee	Ireland, Belgium	Supernatural Horror
The Curse of Bridge Hollow	Jeff Wadlow	Marlon Wayans, Priah Ferguson, Kelly Rowland, John Michael Higgins, Lauren Lapkus, Rob Riggle, Nia Vardalos	United States	Family, Horror, Comedy
The Devil Conspiracy	Nathan Frankowski	Alice Orr-Ewing, Joe Doyle, Eveline Hall, Peter Mensah, Joe Anderson, Spencer Wilding, Brian Caspe, James Faulkner	Czech Republic, United States	Science Fiction Horror
The Elderly	Raúl Cerezo, Fernando González Gómez	Zorion Eguileor, Gustavo Salmerón, Paula Gallego, Irene Anula	Spain	Elderly-themed horror
The Friendship Game	Scooter Corkle	Peyton List, Brendan Meyer, Kelcey Mawema, Dylan Schombing	Canada	Horror Science fiction
The Harbinger	Andy Mitton	Gabby Beans, Emily Davis, Raymond Anthony Thomas	United States	Horror
The House	Emma de Swaef, Marc James Roels, Niki Lindroth von Bahr, Paloma Baeza	Mia Goth, Claudie Blakley, Matthew Goode, Mark Heap, Miranda Richardson, Stephanie Cole, Jarvis Cocker, Yvonne Lombard, Sven Wollter, Will Sharpe, Paul Kaye, Susan Wokoma, Helena Bonham Carter	United Kingdom	Stop-motion Animated Horror Anthology
The Inhabitant	Jerren Lauder	Odessa A'zion, Leslie Bibb, Dermot Mulroney, Lizze Broadway	United States	Horror Thriller
The Invitation	Jessica M. Thompson	Nathalie Emmanuel, Thomas Doherty, Hugh Skinner, Sean Pertwee, Courtney Taylor, Alana Boden, Stephanie Corneliussen	United States	Horror-thriller
The Knocking	Max Seeck, Joonas Pajunen	Inka Kallén, Saana Koivisto, Pekka Strang	Finland	Supernatural horror drama
The Lair	Neil Marshall	Charlotte Kirk, Jamie Bamber, Jonathan Howard, Hadi Khanjanpour	United Kingdom	Monster Action Horror
The Lake	Lee Thongkham, Aqing Xu	Wanmai Chatborirak, Palita Chueasawathee, Su Jack	Thailand, Australia	Science Fiction Horror Thriller
The Legend of La Llorona	Patricia Harris Seeley	Autumn Reeser, Danny Trejo, Antonio Cupo, Zamia Fardiño	United States	Folk horror
The Long Night	Rich Ragsdale	Scout Taylor-Compton, Nolan Gerard Funk, Jeff Fahey, Deborah Kara Unger	United States	Horror
The Mean One	Steven LaMorte	David Howard Thornton, Krystle Martin, Chase Mullins, John Bigham, Erik Baker, Flip Kobler, Amy Schumacher	United States	Black comedy, Slasher
The Menu	Mark Mylod	Ralph Fiennes, Anya Taylor-Joy, Nicholas Hoult, Hong Chau, Janet McTeer, Reed Birney, Judith Light, John Leguizamo	United States	Comedy Horror
The Munsters	Rob Zombie	Sheri Moon Zombie, Jeff Daniel Phillips, Daniel Roebuck, Richard Brake, Jorge Garcia, Sylvester McCoy, Catherine Schell, Cassandra Peterson	United States	Horror Comedy
The Outwaters	Robbie Banfitch	Angela Basolis, Michelle May, Scott Schamell, Robbie Banfitch, Leslie Ann Banfitch, Christine Brown, Aro Caitlin	United States	Horror
The Pale Blue Eye	Scott Cooper	Christian Bale, Harry Melling, Gillian Anderson, Robert Duvall, Timothy Spall, Lucy Boynton, Charlotte Gainsbourg, Toby Jones, Harry Lawtey	United States	Gothic horror-thriller
The Privilege	Felix Fuchssteiner, Katharina Schöne	Lise Risom Olsen, Caroline Hartig, Lea van Acken, Roman Knizka, Nadeshda Brennicke	Germany	Drama Horror Mystery
The Reef: Stalked	Andrew Traucki	Teressa Liane, Ann Truong, Saskia Archer, Kate Lister, Tim Ross	Australia	Survival Horror
The Requin	Le-Van Kiet	Alicia Silverstone, James Tupper, Deirdre O'Connell	United States	Thriller
The Twin	Taneli Mustonen	Teresa Palmer, Steven Cree, Barbara Marten	Finland	Psychological horror
The Visitor	Justin P. Lange	Finn Jones, Jessica McNamee	United States	Psychological horror
The Witch: Part 2. The Other One	Park Hoon-jung	Shin Si-ah, Park Eun-bin, Seo Eun-soo, Jin Goo, Sung Yoo-bin, Jo Min-su	South Korea	Science Fiction Action Horror
The Womb	Fajar Nugros	Naysila Mirdad, Dimas Anggara, Lydia Kandou, Rukman Rosadi	Indonesia	Drama Horror
They/Them	John Logan	Theo Germaine, Carrie Preston, Anna Chlumsky, Austin Crute, Kevin Bacon	United States	Slasher
They Live in the Grey	Burlee Vang, Abel Vang	Michelle Krusiec	United States	Thriller
Those Who Walk Away	Robert Rippberger	Booboo Stewart, Scarlett Sperduto, Grant Morningstar, Bryson JonSteele, Nils Stewart	United States	Horror
Torn Hearts	Brea Grant	Katey Sagal, Abby Quinn, Alexxis Lemire, Joshua Leonard, Shiloh Fernandez	United States	Horror
Troll	Roar Uthaug	Ine Marie Wilmann, Kim Falck, Mads Sjøgård Pettersen, Gard B. Eidsvold, Pål Richard Lunderby, Eric Vorenholt	Norway	Monster Horror
Umma	Iris K. Shim	Sandra Oh, Fivel Stewart, Dermot Mulroney, Odeya Rush, MeeWha Alana Lee, Tom Yi	United States	Supernatural horror
Unhuman	Marcus Dunstan	Brianne Tju, Ali Gallo, Peter Giles, Benjamin Wadsworth, Uriah Shelton	United States	Horror Comedy
V/H/S/99	Johannes Roberts, Vanessa Winter, Joseph Winter, Maggie Levin, Tyler MacIntyre, Flying Lotus	Verona Blue, Dashiell Derrickson, Ally Ioannides, Isabelle Hahn, Steven Ogg, Amelia Ann, Luke Mullen, Emily Sweet, Joseph Winter, Archelaus Crisanto	United States	Found Footage Horror Anthology
Vengeance	B. J. Novak	B. J. Novak, Boyd Holbrook, Dove Cameron, Issa Rae, Ashton Kutcher	United States	Black comedy Mystery Crime Thriller
Venus	Jaume Balagueró	Ester Expósito, Ángela Cremonte, Magüi Mira, Fernando Valdivieso, Federico Aguado	Spain	Cosmic horror
Viking Wolf	Stig Svendsen	Liv Mjönes, Elli Rhiannon Müller Osborne, Arthur Hakalahti, Sjur Vatne Brean	Norway	Horror Thriller
Warhunt	Mauro Borrelli	Mickey Rourke, Robert Knepper, Jackson Rathbone	United States	War Horror
Watcher	Chloe Okuno	Maika Monroe, Karl Glusman, Burn Gorman	United Arab Emirates, United States, Romania	Psychological thriller
Wendell & Wild	Henry Selick	Keegan-Michael Key, Jordan Peele, Angela Bassett, Lyric Ross, Ving Rhames, James Hong	United States	Adult Stop Motion-Animated Horror Comedy
Werewolf by Night	Michael Giacchino	Gael García Bernal, Laura Donnelly, Harriet Sansom Harris	United States	Action-adventure Fantasy Horror Superhero
Who Invited Them	Duncan Birmingham	Ryan Hansen, Melissa Tang, Timothy Granaderos, Perry Mattfeld, Tipper Newton, Barry Rothbart	United States	Comedy Horror
X	Ti West	Mia Goth, Jenna Ortega, Martin Henderson, Brittany Snow, Scott Mescudi	United States	Slasher
You Won't Be Alone	Goran Stelevski	Sara Klimoska	Australia, United States	Drama Horror
