= Synchronic (film) =

2019 American science fiction thriller film

- Theatrical release poster
- Directed by: Justin Benson; Aaron Moorhead
- Written by: Justin Benson
- Produced by: Justin Benson; Aaron Moorhead; David Lawson Jr.; Michael Mendelsohn
- Starring: Anthony Mackie; Jamie Dornan
- Cinematography: Aaron Moorhead
- Edited by: Aaron Moorhead; Justin Benson
- Music by: Jimmy LaValle
- Production companies: XYZ Films; Patriot Pictures; Rustic Films
- Distributed by: Well Go USA Entertainment
- Release dates: September 7, 2019 (TIFF); October 23, 2020 (United States)
- Running time: 102 minutes
- Country: United States
- Language: English
- Budget: $2.5 million
- Box office: $1.5 million

Synchronic is a 2019 American science fiction horror film directed and produced by Justin Benson and Aaron Moorhead. Written by Benson, the film shares continuity with other films by Benson and Moorhead, following Resolution and The Endless. Synchronic stars Anthony Mackie and Jamie Dornan as paramedics who investigate a series of inexplicable deaths and their connection to a new designer drug.

It had its world premiere at the 2019 Toronto International Film Festival. It was released on October 23, 2020, by Well Go USA Entertainment.

== Plot ==
Steve, a womanizing New Orleans paramedic, and his devoted partner, Dennis, face a string of deaths all linked to a new designer drug, Synchronic. When Steve is accidentally pricked by a contaminated needle during a call, tests reveal not only possible infection but also an aggressive cancer in his underdeveloped pineal gland.

Driven to uncover the truth about Synchronic, Steve tracks down the drug's creator. He learns it warps the pineal gland's perception of time, sending users backwards through history. Children experience full time travel, while adults exist only as ghost-like figures in the past.

Meanwhile, Dennis's teenage daughter, Brianna, vanishes. His marriage collapses and he misjudges Steve, whose declining health and painkiller use he mistakes for drug addiction. Their conflict turns into a physical fight.

Fueled by his diagnosis and a desire to find Brianna, Steve experiments with Synchronic. He witnesses Louisiana's past, escaping encounters with a conquistador and the Ku Klux Klan. Using his dog, Hawking, he discovers the location of pill consumption dictates the destination year. But Hawking is lost in the 1920s, unable to return with Steve.

Steve deduces that physical contact with objects can anchor someone in a specific time. Returning to the park where Brianna disappeared, he encounters prehistoric tribesmen but learns Brianna might have simply wandered off before taking Synchronic.

Reconciling with Dennis, Steve reveals his cancer diagnosis. They review Steve's time-travel footage and go to the cemetery where Steve's family is buried. From there, they journey back to the park.

Within the chaos of the Battle of New Orleans, Steve locates a terrified Brianna. When a looter, mistaking Steve for a runaway slave, threatens them, Steve sacrifices himself as a distraction so Brianna can use his last pill to return to the present. Fatally injured and the looter killed by a landmine, Steve carves the word "ALLWAYS" into a boulder. This act casts him as the originator of the symbol found there in the present.

Dennis embraces a safely returned Brianna, as Steve's spectral form lingers. Dennis and Steve acknowledge each other. The film ends on a close-up of their hands clasped together.

== Cast ==
- Anthony Mackie as Steve Denube
- Jamie Dornan as Dennis Dannelly
- Ally Ioannides as Brianna Dannelly
- Katie Aselton as Tara Dannelly
- Ramiz Monsef as Dr. Kermani
- Rhonda Johnson Dents as Nurse Hall
- Bill Oberst Jr. as The Looter
- Natasha Tina Liu as Christina
- Martin Bats Bradford as Animal Bob
- Adam J. Yeend as Kyle T. Wentworth, III
- Devyn A. Tyler as Danika
- Betsy Holt as Leah
- Shane Brady as Travis

== Production ==
In September 2018, it was announced Jamie Dornan and Anthony Mackie had joined the cast of the film, with Justin Benson and Aaron Moorhead directing.

Synchronic shares continuity with previous films by Benson and Moorhead. It is mentioned that the titular drug was synthesized from a red flower grown in the California desert, referencing the plant smoked by members of a commune in the film The Endless.

== Release ==
The film had its world premiere at the Toronto International Film Festival on September 7, 2019. Shortly after, Well Go USA Entertainment acquired U.S. distribution rights to the film, announcing a 2020 release; Universal Pictures Home Entertainment notably acquired rights in several territories including German-speaking countries, France, Latin America, the Benelux, Scandinavia, the Middle East, Indonesia, Hungary, and Poland. It was released in theaters on October 23, 2020.

Synchronic was released on digital and video on demand in the United States on January 12, 2021. The movie was released on Netflix in the US on April 16, 2021.

== Reception ==
Review aggregator website Rotten Tomatoes reports an approval rating of 79% based on 155 reviews and an average rating of 6.8/10. The site's critics consensus reads: "Synchronic sets off on an intriguingly idiosyncratic journey that should satisfy fans of Aaron Moorhead and Justin Benson's earlier work." Metacritic reports a weighted average score of 64 out of 100 based on 23 critics, indicating "generally favorable reviews".
