= Mickey Faerch =

Danish-Canadian dancer and actress

- Born: Mickey Mae Farch; May 10, 1956 (age 70); Copenhagen, Denmark
- Other names: Mickey Farch; The Little Mermaid of Burlesque; Yung Mae
- Education: San Diego State University
- Occupations: Burlesque dancer; actress; rapper
- Years active: 1970s–present
- Known for: The Little Mermaid of Burlesque; Sincerely Saul
- Notable credits: Josie; Run! Bitch Run!
- Children: Daeg Faerch
- Awards: Burlesque Hall of Fame

Mickey Mae Faerch (born May 10, 1956), also known as Mickey Mae and Yung Mae, is a Danish-Canadian burlesque dancer, actress, and rapper who appeared in the films Sincerely Saul (2024), Josie (2018), Run! Bitch Run! (2009), and was inducted into the Burlesque Hall of Fame.

== Personal life ==
Faerch was born on May 10, 1956 in Copenhagen, Denmark. In 1966, she won a 9 years and under competition for playing the accordion, scoring an 85. In 1976, Faerch was injured in a single car accident near Grand Prairie, Alberta. In 1995, she gave birth to a son, Daeg Faerch.

Faerch lived in Guam, Las Vegas, and San Diego, graduating as a Phi Theta Kappa with 4 degrees from San Diego State University.

== Career ==
Before owning a tattoo shop in Guam, Faerch was a burlesque dancer. She started in the 1970s in Guam, before doing shows in France, Japan, Montreal, Quebec, Pittsburgh, Pennsylvania, New York City, and headlining acts in Great Falls, Montana and Vancouver, British Columbia. Known as "The Little Mermaid of Burlesque," Faerch was inducted into the Burlesque Hall of Fame in 2024.

In the 2000s and 2010s, Faerch acted in several films including Run! Bitch Run!, Vampie: The Silliest Vampire Movie Ever Made, Josie, and Killer Therapy.

In the 2020s, Faerch released a debut single as Yung Mae called "Whoop Whoop." She later co-starred as the titular character's "nasty, bedridden grandmother" in Ian Tripp's film Sincerely Saul. Her performance was praised by critics, including The New York Times.

== Filmography ==
Year	Title	Role	Notes
2007	Wiener Takes All: A Dogumentary	Herself	
2007–2010	Tim and Eric Awesome Show, Great Job!	Morning Meditation Woman	
2009	Lost Tapes	Skinwalker	Episode: "Skinwalker"
2009	Run! Bitch Run!	Shotgun Neighbor	
2010	Glee	Lunch Lady	Episode: "Home", uncredited
2011	Sebastián	Psychic Homeless Woman	
2012	Killer Kids	Mrs. / Margurite Gough	2 episodes
2012	American Horror Story	Hair Tugging Patient	Episode: "Nor'easter", uncredited
2013	Fat Planet	Serenity Ravish	
2014	Vampie: The Silliest Vampire Movie Ever Made	Wanda	
2015	Persephone Goes Home	Woman	
2015	Kittens in a Cage	Nurse	
2017	20/20 on ID	Dora	
2018	Adolescence	Diner	
2018	Josie	Gator's Mom	
2018	House of Demons	Older Maya	Uncredited
2019	Memory: The Origins of Alien	Greek-speaking Furie	
2019	Killer Therapy	Blake's Mother	
2020	BAB	Screaming Helen	
2022	I, Challenger	Joan	
2024	Sincerely Saul	Grandma Diana	
