= House of Darkness =

House of Darkness may refer to:

- House of Darkness (1948 film), a British film directed by Oswald Mitchell
- The House of Darkness, a 1913 American silent film
- House of Darkness, a 2016 film with Sara Fletcher
- House of Darkness (2022 film), a film directed by Neil LaBute
