= Resolution (film) =

2012 film directed by Justin Benson and Aaron Moorhead

- Directed by: Justin Benson; Aaron Moorhead
- Written by: Justin Benson
- Produced by: Justin Benson; David Lawson
- Starring: Peter Cilella; Vinny Curran; Zahn McClarnon; Bill Oberst Jr.
- Cinematography: Aaron Moorhead
- Edited by: Justin Benson; Aaron Moorhead
- Production company: Rustic Films
- Distributed by: Tribeca Film; Cinedigm
- Release dates: April 20, 2012 (Tribeca Film Festival); January 25, 2013
- Running time: 93 minutes
- Country: United States
- Language: English
- Budget: $20,000

Resolution is a 2012 American horror film directed by Justin Benson and Aaron Moorhead, written by Benson, and starring Peter Cilella and Vinny Curran. It follows a graphic designer who travels to a remote cabin to save his drug-addicted best friend. The films Spring (2014), The Endless (2017) and Synchronic (2019) share the same creative universe as Resolution and may be interpreted as partial sequels.

== Plot ==
Michael Danube, a graphic designer living in the city with his pregnant wife, receives an email containing a video of Chris Daniels, his best friend. Chris, a drug addict, has retreated to a remote rural area and has become delusional and erratic. A map is included with the video. Despite his wife's objections, Michael makes one last attempt to save Chris. He promises to return after one week and follows the map.

At his destination, Michael hears Chris ranting and shooting a pistol. Chris invites Michael in and starts ranting about various subjects. When Chris refuses to go into rehab, Michael subdues him with a stun gun, handcuffs him, and says that he will make Chris go cold turkey to get sober. In the morning, Michael staves off an attempted attack from Chris.

Later, Micah and Billy, Michael and Chris' old acquaintances, arrive and ask for drugs that Chris is holding. After Michael drives them off, Chris warns against messing with them, as they have become violent and unpredictable. As he takes a walk, Michael meets members of a UFO religion, then returns to the house and finds a set of strange photographs. Micah and Billy return, but Charles, a tribal security guard chases them off. Charles tells Michael that Chris is squatting on reservation land, but accepts Michael's bribe in exchange for letting them stay for five days.

After they discover disturbing film footage, Chris denies sending any emails or videos. Michael finds a book full of campfire stories on their doorstep, and, when he returns the book to the library, finds film slides in its place. Confused by the items that seem purposefully left for them to find, Michael suggests that it is a prank by Billy and Micah, which Chris dismisses.

Michael continues to find clues strewn about the area. When he bribes Charles for information, Charles warns him against digging into the past, only saying French students used the area for research, and they asked a lot about the nearby caves. They encounter a con artist who offers to buy the house and leaves after Michael says that they are only "renting." Michael re-watches the video he received in the e-mail and finds it has changed, it now shows an argument that Michael and Chris had moments before. Billy and Micah return and kill a dog that Chris had adopted, and Chris reveals that he is suicidal.

Michael explores the nearby caves, finding imagery of figures on the wall, then rushes out when a homeless man screams at him, causing Michael to sprain his ankle. He then tracks down the dog's original owner, an archeologist named Byron, a member of the original French research team. Byron, who smokes a hallucinogenic drug that is red in color, suggests that the two other student researchers were looking for monsters and found themselves. Byron believes the area is not haunted; instead, "something" there desires stories. While reflecting a small mirror into a large one, creating an infinity of reflections of himself and Michael, Byron stresses the need for a beginning, middle, and end. Unnerved by Byron's eccentricity, Michael leaves.

The next morning, Michael awakes to a image of two figures on the wall, similar to images from the cave, apparently carved by Chris' knife found on the floor. Chris questions Michael's sanity and they discuss the confusing, threatening situation and all the clues that seemed to be placed deliberately for them to find. Chris then admits that he will never go to rehab, and Michael needs to learn to let him go. As he turns to leave the cabin, the film projector Michael has been using turns on and projects gruesome deaths and funeral photos of himself and Chris. Michael's laptop then glitches to show their current self (as if through a livestream or webcam recording), which glitches and seemingly fast-forwards to footage of Micah and Billy beating them to death. Thinking of Byron's message, Michael theorizes that an entity has been watching them this whole time and wants an ending to their story.

Michael and Chris flee the house together. Michael spots the bag of meth in a truck that he owed to Billy, and Chris places it near the front door of the house for Billy to find in their absence. In Michael's car, they find and listen to a CD that has a recording of Charles murdering them and burning down the house. Chris wants to leave the property immediately; Michael, however, does not want to bring the curse home and wants to appease the entity instead.

The door to a nearby shed suddenly falls over. Chris and Michael reluctantly investigate and find a film reel, unsure of whether to open it now or bring it with them elsewhere. They spot Micah and Billy, who break Michael's truck windows; Chris and Michael hide behind the shed and check the reel, which reveals images of the pair, such as a scene of them outside, near a fire. Michael laments that there could be footage of them on cameras and recording devices anywhere in the world. They notice Micah and Billy entering the cabin and joyously consuming the meth.

Michael suggests hiding by the rocks in front of the cabin (the location shown at the end of the film reel), in order to appease the entities with following the story through to the end. They wait until nighttime, watching Micah and Billy partaking in the drugs, and talk positively about their memories, relationships, and their lives. Michael reveals that he is an expectant father, and affirms that Chris would be a great uncle to his future child.

They witness Charles and a companion from the reservation killing Micah and Billy before setting the house on fire. Chris and Michael panic; Chris breaks down and finally agrees to go to rehab. Their joy over achieving a happy ending to their story is abruptly cut short when the entity angrily confronts them. Chris kneels before it and apologizes profusely, and Michael asks the entity if they can try again. The creature roars in response.

== Cast ==
- Peter Cilella as Michael Danube
- Vinny Curran as Chris Daniels
- Zahn McClarnon as Charles
- Bill Oberst Jr. as Byron
- Kurt David Anderson as Billy
- Skyler Meacham as Micah
- Justin Benson as Justin
- Aaron Moorhead as Aaron

== Production ==
Although the film is often described as "genre-bending", this was not an intentional concept; it was always meant as a horror film about an unseen antagonist that manipulates reality to create interesting stories. The detox plotline was introduced to give the story more structure, as the directors needed a plot device to have the story unfold over seven days. The script was written in six months. The main parts of the film were shot in 17 days, but the side plots were shot over the course of several months on weekends. The directors were specifically interested in avoiding overt homage, and, instead, focused on parodying independent film tropes. The film was shot in East County, San Diego. The directors have no direct experience with detox; to perform research, they searched Google for information. Benson was acquainted with a crack addict, however, and he used some of the addict's ramblings as inspiration for Chris' dialog.

== Release ==
Resolution had its world premiere at the Tribeca Film Festival April 20, 2012. Tribeca Film gave the film an initial limited theatrical release on January 25, 2013. Cinedigm and Tribeca Film released Resolution on DVD, Blu-ray, and video-on-demand October 8, 2013.

== Reception ==
=== Reviews ===
Rotten Tomatoes, a review aggregator, reports that Resolution received positive reviews from 80% of 15 critics surveyed. Metacritic scored it 80/100 based on 5 reviews, which indicates "generally favorable reviews". Mark Adams of Screen Daily called it "a clever, twisted and very impressive slow-burner of a chiller". Rod Lott of the Oklahoma Gazette called it suspenseful and singled out the last 20 minutes as "seriously unnerving." Jason Jenkins of Dread Central rated the film 4.5/5 stars and wrote, "With its great cast, unique concept, and its sharply written script, Resolution is one of the very best films I’ve seen this year." Peter Gutierrez of Twitch Film said that the film has a "quietly mythic power" and takes many big risks that pay off. Adam Tyner of DVD Talk rated the film 5/5 stars and wrote, "There's a sense of unease that pervades almost every frame in Resolution, and a key part of it is not knowing what's lurking around the next bend. This is what horror movies are supposed to do, but it hardly ever really works in practice. Resolution not only nails it, but it does so without leaning on any jump scares, stings in the score, or cheap gore as a crutch."

Michael Nazarewycz of DVD Verdict said that Resolution is "a very good film" that gives new life to old tropes. Dennis Harvey of Variety wrote, "There are long buildups, and then there's Resolution, a movie that's virtually all nothing-much-happening setup until a still-teasing titular event that occupies just a few final seconds." Lonnie Nadler of Bloody Disgusting rated the film 4/5 stars and wrote that it "delivers a dashingly intelligent commentary on the horror genre, the nature of cinema, and the relationship viewers have to on-screen victims." Serena Whitney of Dread Central rated the film 5/5 stars and called it "a remarkable achievement" and "an inventive, character-based story" that "provides be the breath of fresh air the genre sorely needs". Robert Abele of the Los Angeles Times wrote that it offers "a strangely tense and humorous meta-narrative" that "manages to keep its eerier moments surprising and its emotional life arresting."

Many reviews compared it to The Cabin in the Woods. SFX rated it 3.5/5 stars and described it as "clever, creepy meta-horror" that is like a lo-fi version of The Cabin in the Woods. Kurt Halfyard of Twitch Film wrote, "Unlike the smug, offhand silliness of Joss Whedon and Drew Goddard's Cabin in the Woods, this one makes you give a damn; as much about the films building Lost-type puzzlebox, but moreso the two exceptionally well realized characters." Scott Weinberg of Fearnet called the film "a smart and subversive take" that is less entertaining than Cabin in the Woods. Nick Schager of The Village Voice wrote that it puts Cabin in the Woods "to shame on a fraction of the budget". Ian Buckwalter of NPR wrote, "Resolution is really a less self-conscious cousin to last year's Cabin in the Woods; both are hugely satisfying exercises in examining the way in which stories are told." Scott Tobias of The A.V. Club rated it B and called it "an indie analog to The Cabin In The Woods" that "gets further in its conceit than its execution".

=== Awards ===
At Macabro 2013, the directors were awarded Best Director. At the Toronto After Dark Film Festival, the film won four awards, including best screenplay and most innovative film. The directors won Best Director at the 2013 Fantastic Planet film festival.
