= Sincerely Saul =

- Official poster
- Directed by: Ian Tripp
- Written by: Ian Tripp
- Produced by: Ryan Schafer; Ian Tripp; Alan Vazquez
- Starring: Ryan Schafer; Mickey Faerch; Augie Duke; Karl Backus; Brendan Cahalan; Amber Grayson; Paul Fisher III; Randy Davison; Luis Martinez; Beth Gallagher; T.K. Richardson
- Cinematography: Oscar Perez
- Edited by: Ian Tripp
- Music by: Sam Sprague
- Production company: Children of Celluloid
- Distributed by: Children of Celluloid
- Release dates: September 26, 2024 (Philadelphia Unnamed Film Festival); September 29, 2025 (VOD)
- Country: United States
- Language: English
- Budget: $60,000

Sincerely Saul is a 2024 black-and-white horror comedy film written and directed by Ian Tripp. It stars Ryan Schafer, Mickey Faerch, Augie Duke, and Karl Backus.

== Premise ==
Living with his grandmother, Saul attempts to end his life if he can't lose his virginity by his 27th birthday.

== Cast ==
- Ryan Schafer as Saul
- Mickey Faerch as Grandma Diana
- Augie Duke as Becky Baby
- Karl Backus as Officer Porter
- Brendan Cahalan as Verne
- Amber Grayson as Joni
- Paul Fisher III as Franklin
- Randy Davison as Carry the Counsellor
- Luis Martinez as Lucho Maximo Supreme
- Beth Gallagher as Elizabeth
- T.K. Richardson as Damon
- Nathan Chapman as Derek
- Ty Mabrey as Comic Clerk Carl
- Kenneth Long as Ronnie the Pizza Boy
- Caroline Amiguet as The Madam
- Mark Atkinson as Stew the Suit
- Jackson Banks as New Years Eve Broadcaster
- Paisley Bird as Jessie Star
- Melissa Browne as Alicia Anon
- Joe Castro as Joe
- Vinny Curran as Trigger-Fingers
- Anthony De La Cruz as Casino Patron
- Mike Egbert as Mr. Money Man
- Mickey Farhat as N.P.C.
- Xairan Gutierrez as A.M.V.
- Jason Hughes as Nurse Benjamin
- Jesse Keller as Convention Manager
- Tori King as Angry Mom
- Tomlyn Nicholson as Verne's Dad
- Suzana Norberg as Bank Agent
- Ruben O'Neill as A.M.V.
- Beto Ochoa as A.M.V.
- Ryan Ohm as Pizza Delivery Dispatcher
- Kimberly Ransom as Marie's Mom
- Sam Sprague as A.M.V.
- Michael Tripp as Casino Patron
- Wendy Tripp as Social Worker Sally
- Raquel Trivino as Convention Goer
- Alan Vazquez Gregory as Gothico
- Carl Wyble Access as Impairment Driver
- Joshua Wyble as Nightmare Doctor

== Production ==
Children of Celluloid produced, which was shot in black and white and printed on 16 mm film. Principal photography occurred in San Diego.

== Release ==
The film premiered on September 26, 2024, at the Philadelphia Unnamed Film Festival. It was released on video on demand on September 29, 2025.

== Reception ==
The New York Times wrote it is a "gloriously demented low-fi horror comedy." Reel Reviews scored the film 4 out of 5, writing it is "a madhouse of modern day dilemmas." Upcoming Horror Movies and HorrorBuzz scored it 7 out of 10. Variety wrote that it is "a surreal black and white treat."

Projected Figures called it a "low-budget, lo-fi cringe-comedy freakout." Bloody Flicks said that it "lingers like a bruise, a reminder that life on the margins is rarely kind." Some critics wrote the film is similar to Clerks and Eraserhead, and compared Saul to the titular character in Napoleon Dynamite.

Film critic Daniel M. Kimmel scored it 2 out of 5, writing "Those of a certain age with an especially twisted sense of humor may be able to relate. Everyone else will wonder what the hell is going on."
