= Vinny Curran =

American actor

- Education: Grossmont High School; Southwestern College
- Occupations: Actor; bartender
- Years active: 2009–present
- Known for: Everybody Dies by the End; Resolution
- Notable credits: The Endless; Something in the Dirt; Spring
- Father: Pat Curran

Vinny Curran is an American actor who starred in the films Resolution (2012), Everybody Dies by the End (2022) and appeared in Spring (2014), The Endless (2017), Something in the Dirt (2022) and Machine Head (2011).

== Personal life ==
Curran grew up in El Cajon, California, playing in Little League Baseball, coached by his father Pat Curran. He is an entertainer with a stage and theater background who graduated from Grossmont High School. In the early 1990s, Curran played football in high school, and later at Southwestern College, before settling to live in Pacific Beach, San Diego in 1996. His lifestyle and business has kept him away from relocating for acting gigs.

== Career ==
In 2011, Curran became a manager and co-owner of a dive bar called Thrusters Lounge in Pacific Beach. He caught the attention of EBaum's World in 2019 after responding to several negative reviews of his business on Yelp. Curran's replies attracted a lot of attention for himself and the bar after news outlets picked up the story.

=== Acting ===
Curran acted in several films by Justin Benson and Aaron Moorhead including Spring and Something in the Dirt. He filmed a behind the scenes documentary for his time on set of The Endless which Arrow Films included as part of the film's Special Edition Contents on physical media. Curran portrayed a Ghostfaced-like serial killer in Machine Head, and was also cast in Ian Tripp's next three upcoming films.

=== 2012: Resolution ===
Curran starred alongside Peter Cilella in Benson and Moorhead's debut film Resolution after working with Benson on a beer commercial. His performance was positively received from critics Serena Whitney at Dread Central and Anton Bitel at Little White Lies. Ian Buckwalter at NPR said his character "bounces frenetically from meth-fueled mania to sarcasm-laced depression to an oddly calm acceptance."

=== 2022: Everybody Dies by the End ===
In 2022, Curran starred in Everybody Dies by the End as film director Alfred Costella, a part written only for him. Evan Jordan at Void Video Podcast and Anton Bitel at Projected Figures praised his performance. David and Tara Court at Ginger Nuts of Horror said that he was "perfectly cast as the maniacal director." Pip Ellwood-Hughes at Entertainment Focus said his delivery was shouted without nuance. Curran's performance earned him Best Lead Actor at the 2023 San Diego Film Awards. Gabby Foor at Warped Perspective described him as an "artistic train wreck."

== Filmography ==
Year	Title	Role	Ref.
2012	Resolution	Chris Daniels	
2014	Machine Head	Machine Head	
2014	Spring	Mike	
2017	The Endless	Chris Daniels	
2022	Everybody Dies by the End	Alfred Costella	
2022	Something in the Dirt	Dr. Vincent Daniels	
2024	Daydreamer	Hopper	
2024	Sincerely Saul	Trigger-Fingers	
TBA	A Corpse in Kensington †	Kirk	
TBA	Manny Moondog †	Mountain Man	
TBA	Normy †	Dee-Jay	

Key
†	Denotes films that have not yet been released
