= Descendent (2025 film) =

Film by Peter Cilella

- Theatrical release poster
- Directed by: Peter Cilella
- Written by: Peter Cilella
- Produced by: David Lawson Jr; Caleb Ward; Aaron Moorhead Justin Benson
- Starring: Ross Marquand; Sarah Bolger
- Cinematography: Alexander Chinnici
- Edited by: Jordan Goldstein
- Music by: Tyler Strickland
- Production company: Rustic Films
- Distributed by: RLJE Films
- Release dates: March 10, 2025 (SXSW); August 15, 2025 (United States)
- Running time: 92 minutes
- Country: United States
- Language: English
- Box office: $8,163

Descendent is a 2025 American science fiction thriller film written and directed by Peter Cilella, and produced by filmmaking duo Justin Benson and Aaron Moorhead. Starring Ross Marquand and Sarah Bolger, the film premiered at South by Southwest on March 10, 2025. It was released on digital platforms on August 15, 2025.

== Premise ==
Sean Bruner, a school security guard in Los Angeles, struggles with childhood trauma while he and his wife, Andrea, prepare for the birth of their first child. One night during his shift, a mysterious beam of light appears in the sky, and he later wakes up in a hospital with abilities of "creating vivid, unsettling drawings of extraterrestrials and desert landscapes".

== Cast ==
- Ross Marquand as Sean
- Sarah Bolger as Andrea
- Susan Wilder as Aunt Robin
- Charlene Amoia as Laurie
- Dan O'Brien as Christian
- Brandon Scott as Dr. Witten
- Alexandra Barreto as Patricia
- Parvesh Cheena as Principal Kakkar
- Peter Cilella as Sean's dad
- Clare Cooney as Dr. Sturgill
- Emily Pendergast as Kimmie
- Alex Ruiz as Elton

== Production ==
Descendent was written and directed by Peter Cilella in his feature directorial debut. Ross Marquand and Sarah Bolger was cast in the leading roles. It was financed by Highland Film Group and produced by Justin Benson and Aaron Moorhead, David Lawson Jr, and Caleb Ward of Rustic Films. Under the shooting title of Josiah Road, principal photography took place on location in Los Angeles from January to February 2023.

== Release ==
The film was acquired by RLJE Films for US distribution prior to its world premiere at the 2025 South by Southwest Film & TV Festival on March 10. It was released on digital platforms on August 15, 2025.

== Reception ==
On the review aggregator website Rotten Tomatoes, 88% of 25 critics' reviews are positive, with an average rating of 6.6/10.

Dennis Harvey of Variety wrote that the film blends genre and character drama in a restrained, atmospheric, and well-crafted way, though the approach can become frustrating. He said, "But those expecting straightforward sci-fi horror may resent the writer-director's insistence on sticking to an ambiguity". Katie Rife writing for IndieWire gave the film a "B-" grade.

== See also ==
- Fire in the Sky
