= The Endless (film) =

2017 film by Justin Benson and Aaron Moorhead

- Theatrical release poster
- Directed by: Justin Benson; Aaron Moorhead
- Written by: Justin Benson
- Produced by: Justin Benson; Thomas R. Burke; David Lawson Jr. Aaron Moorhead; Leal Naim
- Starring: Justin Benson; Aaron Moorhead; Callie Hernandez; Tate Ellington; Lew Temple; James Jordan
- Cinematography: Aaron Moorhead
- Edited by: Michael Felker; Justin Benson; Aaron Moorhead
- Music by: Jimmy LaValle
- Production companies: Rustic Films; Snowfort Pictures; Love & Death Productions; Pfaff & Pfaff Productions
- Distributed by: Well Go USA Entertainment
- Release dates: April 21, 2017 (Tribeca Film Festival); April 6, 2018 (United States)
- Running time: 111 minutes
- Country: United States
- Language: English
- Box office: $957,694

The Endless is a 2017 American science fiction horror film directed, produced by and starring Justin Benson and Aaron Moorhead. Benson wrote the film, while Moorhead was the cinematographer; both also acted as editors. It premiered on April 21, 2017, at the Tribeca Film Festival, before being released nationwide on April 6, 2018.

Co-starring Callie Hernandez, Tate Ellington, Lew Temple, and James Jordan, the film tells the story of two brothers (Benson and Moorhead) who visit an alleged cult to which they formerly belonged. The Endless may be interpreted as a partial sequel to Benson and Moorhead's previous films Resolution (2012) and Spring (2014), as it shares the same universe and some of the same characters. It received favorable reviews from critics.

== Plot ==
Brothers Justin and Aaron Smith receive a video cassette from Camp Arcadia, a group they belonged to as young children. The pair's recollection of events differ; while Aaron recalls them as a harmless and friendly commune, Justin thinks the group was a UFO death cult. Aaron points out that the video cassette proves the members are still alive. Justin, however, is worried that talk of "ascension" may be a code for some future mass suicide. Fed up with their inability to make friends or find good jobs since leaving Camp Arcadia, Aaron and Justin decide to return for just one day.

They head to Camp Arcadia in the backwoods outside of San Diego and receive a friendly welcome. None of the members seem to have aged in the decade since their departure. Among them, Anna and Lizzy take an interest in Aaron and Justin, respectively. While Aaron welcomes the attention, Justin keeps his distance. One of the members, Hal, excitedly shows Justin a physics equation he has been working on. He says that he cannot explain what it represents, as it would be akin to describing an impossible color. However, he hopes that Justin will eventually accept the group's beliefs now that he is older. As they participate in various activities, Aaron grows increasingly fond of the camp, and convinces Justin to stay an additional day.

During one activity, members attempt to win a tug-of-war against a rope that ascends into the night sky. Justin says it is held by a member on a ladder but cannot explain how he loses when everyone else is present. The brothers separately notice increasingly abnormal occurrences. While exploring the woods, Justin becomes convinced an invisible entity is observing him, and it leaves him a photograph of a buoy. When pressed for answers, Hal admits to Justin that he knows no more than anyone else. His equation is his interpretation of what is happening, and he encourages Justin to find his own answers by following the entity's clues, such as the buoy in the photograph. Two moons rise in the sky and Hal explains away the second moon as an atmospheric phenomenon, then says that two moons bring the truth, and three moons signify the ascension. Hal tells Justin to come to a conclusion before a third moon rises.

On a fishing trip with Aaron, Justin sees the buoy from the photograph and dives under it. He returns with a toolbox containing a tape and says something else is under the water. Disturbed by the strange events and hints of their meaning, Justin insists they leave immediately. At the camp, Hal and Justin get into an argument after Hal plays the tape, which is a recording of Justin and Aaron misrepresenting Camp Arcadia to outsiders. Justin calls Hal a cult leader, and Hal says Justin made up lurid stories to tell the press about Camp Arcadia. Outraged that Justin was misleading him, too, Aaron refuses to leave. Justin's car does not start, and he leaves to find help.

Justin encounters several people stuck in time loops, most of whom repeatedly experience violent deaths for the entity's amusement. They explain that Justin will also become trapped once the third moon rises. Justin finds Aaron, and on their way back to the camp, the brothers pass various monoliths and structures depicting the entity as interpreted by different cultures. Despite Justin's explanations, Aaron still prefers staying to returning to his old life. He reasons that in Camp Arcadia he can live forever with people who care about him. Although each time loop culminates with death at the hands of the entity (considered a sacred ritual by the cult) he says that is still better than a dreary life of menial jobs and no friends. When Justin admits he was wrong to force Aaron into always following his lead, Aaron becomes hopeful that their relationship can improve and agrees to leave after all. The brothers barely escape as the entity appears to destroy the camp. The brothers drive away while the loop resets, and the reborn members of the cult seem wistful about their departure.

== Cast ==
- Justin Benson as Justin Smith
- Aaron Moorhead as Aaron Smith
- Callie Hernandez as Anna
- Tate Ellington as Hal
- Lew Temple as Tim
- James Jordan as Shitty Carl
- Shane Brady as Shane Williams
- Kira Powell as Lizzy
- David Lawson Jr. as Smiling Dave
- Emily Montague as Jennifer Danube
- Peter Cilella as Michael Danube
- Vinny Curran as Chris Daniels
- Glen Roberts as Woods

== Production ==
The film was shot in Descanso, located in southeastern San Diego County.

== Release ==
The film premiered at the Tribeca Film Festival on April 21, 2017. On May 1, 2017, Well Go USA Entertainment acquired distribution rights to the film. The film was released on April 6, 2018, by Well Go USA Entertainment.

=== Critical reception ===
On review aggregator website Rotten Tomatoes, the film holds an approval rating of 92% based on 132 reviews and an average rating of 7.6/10. The website's critical consensus reads, "The Endless benefits from its grounded approach to an increasingly bizarre story, elevated by believable performances by filmmakers Justin Benson and Aaron Moorhead." On Metacritic, the film has a weighted average score of 80 out of 100, based on 18 critics, indicating "generally favorable reviews".

Matt Zoller Seitz of RogerEbert.com gave the film three-and-a-half stars out of four, stating, "If you have a good idea, a strong cast, a smart script, and directorial chops, you don't need a lot of money to make a compelling movie. The Endless is proof."

Horror novelist and podcaster Brian Keene praised the film on social media, tweeting "The Endless is a true horror masterpiece—a David Lynch meets Stuart Gordon meets Don Coscarelli fever dream of Lovecraftian cosmic horror that demands repeated viewings."

== See also ==
- List of films featuring time loops
- List of media set in San Diego
