= Here Alone (film) =

- Theatrical released poster
- Directed by: Rod Blackhurst
- Written by: David Ebeltoft
- Produced by: Rod Blackhurst; David Ebeltoft; Arun Kumar; Noah Lang; Josh Murphy
- Starring: Lucy Walters; Gina Piersanti; Shane West; Agung Bagus; Holly Adams; Mary Guzzy; Aubrey Hart; Wilow Keith; Rebecca Spiro
- Cinematography: Adam McDaid
- Edited by: Rod Blackhurst
- Music by: Eric D. Johnson; Gea Wilson; Azki Reth
- Production companies: Gentile Entertainment Group; Preferred Content
- Distributed by: Signature Entertainment、Vertical Entertainment
- Release dates: April 15, 2016 (Tribeca Film Festival); March 31, 2017 (United States)
- Running time: 94 minutes
- Country: United States
- Language: English

Here Alone is a post-apocalyptic film directed by Rod Blackhurst. Written by David Ebeltoft, the film premiered at the 2016 Tribeca Film Festival and was released theatrically on March 30, 2017.

== Plot ==
Sometime after a zombie-like infection decimates the world's population, Ann (Lucy Walters) struggles to survive in the woods. There are few resources and she is forced to live off the land, as abandoned houses attract dangerous, infected corpses. Throughout, Ann clings to the hope of civilization, listening to a crank radio that broadcasts an emergency message in French, a language she does not understand, and other reminders of her past life.

That past life includes her husband, Jason (Shane West), and child, an infant daughter. They are gone, and the movie explains their fate through a series of flashbacks.

On her way back from getting food from a nearby home, Ann comes across an injured man, Chris (Adam David Thompson), and his teenage stepdaughter, Olivia (Gina Piersanti). She helps them, nursing Chris back to health, but finds it difficult to trust him or Olivia.

A short time later, Chris and Olivia are about to leave when a storm rolls in; Ann allows them to stay a little while longer. Time passes and Chris and Ann form a romantic relationship, much to Olivia's irritation.

It is revealed later on that after leaving to find supplies for Ann and their daughter during the night, Jason was attacked and killed by the infected, leaving Ann to protect their child. One day, when she leaves to find food, she kills one of the infected; unknown to Ann, blood splatters onto her coat. She returns to find her daughter crying but unharmed. When Ann comforts her, the blood from her coat accidentally gets in her daughter's mouth.

Ann's daughter develops circular rashes on her belly, a telltale sign of infection. Left with no other options, Ann grinds up a bottle of aspirin, mixes it with baby formula, including droplets of her own blood, and feeds it to her daughter.

Ann decides to go North with Chris and Olivia. To do this, they must gather food from the house Ann has regularly searched so that they're able to make the journey; while Chris distracts the infected gathered in the yard, Ann and Olivia sneak into the house and start searching for food. While Ann is distracted, Olivia knocks her out, ties her up, screams, then takes the food and runs back to camp. Ann escapes, then finds Olivia and Chris under attack by the infected that Olivia drew with her scream.

Only Olivia and Ann have survived. In the car, driving down the road, Olivia rests her head on Ann's lap; Ann screams in pain and frustration over the ordeal she endured.

== Cast ==
- Lucy Walters as Ann
- Gina Piersanti as Olivia
- Shane West as Jason
- Adam David Thompson as Chris
- Agung Bagus as Male 4
- Mike Lavarnway as Male 1
- Rebecca Spiro as Female 2
- Aubrey Hart as Male 3
- Willow Keith as Female 1
- Ryken A. as Hailey
- Holly Adams as Female 4

== Production ==
Filming took place in the Steuben, Chemung and Schuyler counties.

== Reception ==
=== Critical response ===
On the review aggregator website Rotten Tomatoes, 54% of 24 critics' reviews are positive, with an average rating of 5.6/10. The website's consensus reads: "Here Alone may not suffer from an overabundance of narrative substance, but it offers enough post-apocalyptic action to satisfy." On Metacritic, the film received an aggregate critic score of 59 out of 100, based on 4 critics, indicating "mixed or average" reviews.

Dennis Harvey of Variety wrote, "Though there's not a whole lot of plot here, Ebeltoft makes a virtue of writing economy, and director Rod Blackhurt [sic]... maintains considerable interest as well as a consistent low hum of tension. The performers are all credible as ordinary, fallible folk who've managed to survive a plague (so far) through sheer luck as much as anything; no one here is larger-than-life." The New York Times's Jeannette Catsoulis called the film "unexpectedly engaging", adding, "More psychodrama than postapocalyptic adventure, the movie parcels out its scares in small, effective jolts, delivering just enough menace to remind us of the stakes." The Village Voice's Tatiana Crane wrote, "Although writer David Ebeltoft's post-apocalyptic story feels familiar at times (reminiscent of parts of Stephen King's The Stand), the scenery and Blackhurst's direction make Here Alone a verdant, suspenseful treat."

Noel Murray of the Los Angeles Times was more critical, writing, "The parts where Ann fights savagely against the bloodthirsty hordes then returns to take care of her baby are particularly poignant. But the overworked structure minimizes genre kicks, opting instead for blandly touchy-feely business involving Ann's emotional journey... This is the first act of a better movie, stretched to fill a feature."

=== Accolades ===
The film received the Audience Award at the 2016 Tribeca Film Festival and later received the Best Actress Award at the Tallgrass Film Festival and the Empire State Filmmaker Award from the St. Lawrence International Film Festival.
