= Daeg Faerch =

American actor (born 1995)

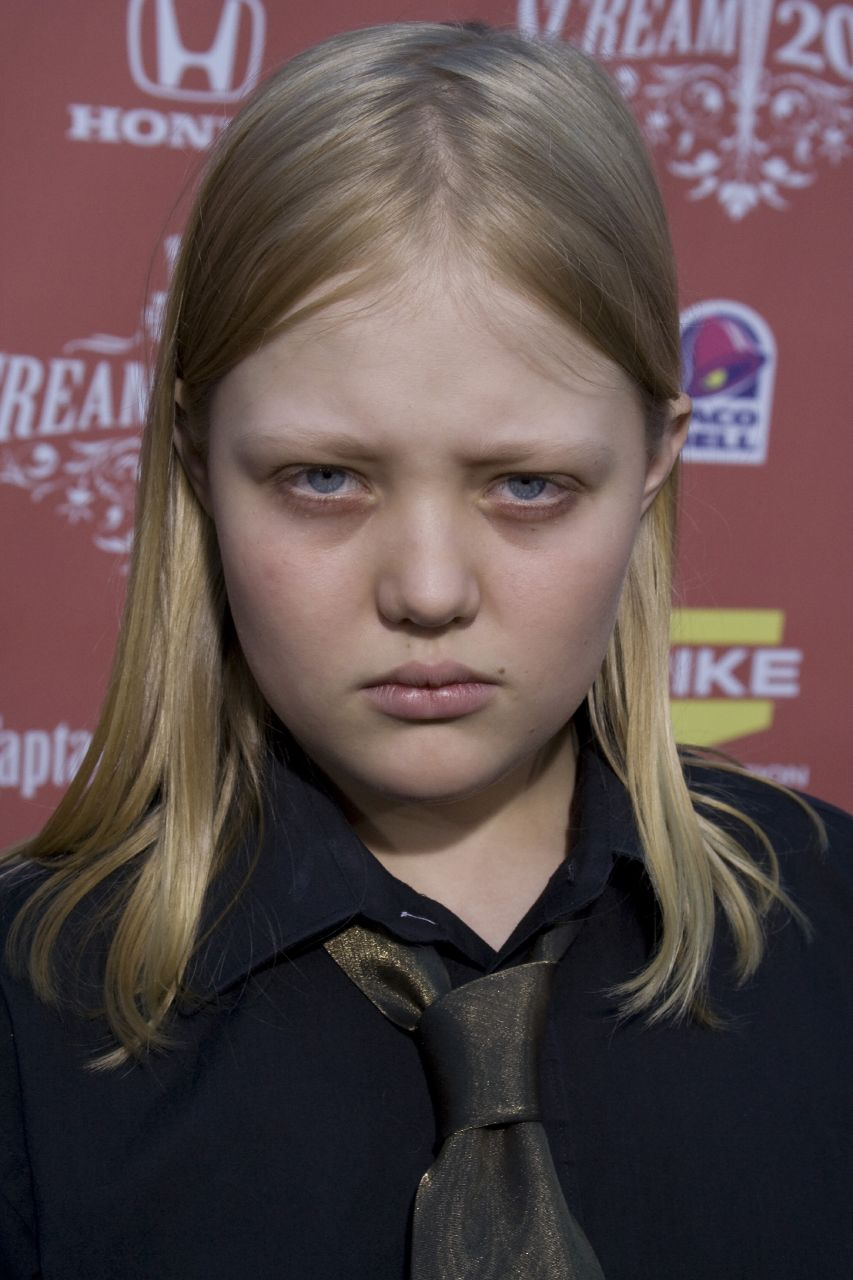
- Faerch at the 2007 Scream Awards
- Born: Daeg Neergaard Faerch; September 27, 1995 (age 31); San Diego, California, U.S.
- Other names: GreatDaeg; Dnmrkboom
- Occupations: Actor; rapper
- Years active: 2004–present
- Mother: Mickey Faerch

Daeg Neergaard Faerch (/ˈdeɪɡ ˈfɛərk/; born September 27, 1995), also known as GreatDaeg or Dnmrkboom, is an American actor, singer, songwriter, and rapper. He is perhaps best known for his portrayal of young Michael Myers in Rob Zombie's horror remake Halloween (2007). Faerch has also played in theatrical productions of Grapes of Wrath, in which he played the role of Winfield; Marat/Sade, in which he played the role of young Herald; Waiting for Godot, playing the messenger; and Shakespeare Unabridged as a musical guest. He has performed in multiple Shakespeare productions, including Coriolanus, in which he played young Coriolanus; The Merry Wives of Windsor; and Hamlet. He also landed the role of Pincegurre in the French play L'Impromptu de Théophile, as well as a role in the comedy The Nerd, in which he played the character Thor Waldgrave. In addition to English, Faerch speaks French. On YouTube Faerch has posted videos in which he performs in rap music videos under the name "GreatDaeg". His albums include Stunt from the 6 (2018), Vlad (2019), Albino Animal (2019), Quarantime (2020), Wicked Wicked West (2020), and Pieces (2020).

== Career ==
=== Halloween ===
As a child actor, Faerch was cast in the 2007 Halloween remake as a young Michael Myers, performing his own stunts. Faerch's performance as the murderous young Myers was met with positive reviews. KPBS said of the young actor: "Daeg Faerch is key in making these early scenes work. He delivers a truly chilling performance as a surprisingly sweet, soft and feminine looking ten-year-old Myers. His physical appearance contrasts with his brutal actions and it's only in his eyes that you perceive his true nature...Faerch's Myers can be like a normal kid one minute and a monster the next." Although Faerch was initially signed on to reprise his role as young Michael Myers in the sequel, Halloween II (then known as H2), after filming briefly in Georgia as young Michael, he was later recast because he had grown taller. He was replaced by Chase Wright Vanek.

=== Other projects ===
Faerch has a comedic role as a character named Michel in Peter Berg's 2008 Will Smith film, Hancock, where he plays a French American neighborhood boy who swears at Smith and is thrown into the sky by the titular superhero for insulting him, but falls back to earth unharmed with Hancock catching him.

Faerch's other projects include the thriller Sebastian in the title role, which also features his mother; the Christmas comedy Wreck the Halls starring Mickey Rooney as Santa Claus; the short film Suffer the Little Children, based on a story by Stephen King co-starring his mother. Faerch also performed in 2008 episodes of the TV show Pushing Daisies, as a German schoolboy. He also recently co-starred as a homosexual young man named Jesse in the award-winning short film, Mental. On April 14, 2012, Faerch's 2010/2011 film Sebastian premiered at the Independent Film Quarterly (IFQ) Film and Webisode Festival, its only screening, where it also won Best Sci-Fi Feature.

A serious, near-fatal head injury and emergency surgery put Faerch's career on hold in 2012. In April 2013, Faerch and Kimberly J. Brown were attached to star in a science fiction thriller entitled Out There..., to be directed by writer and Colorado native Bonné Bartron. It was to be filmed in Bartron's home state, and was originally to be funded through Kickstarter, but failed to meet its $200,000 goal. Bartron then posted an update on Kickstarter, stating that she was taking the project to Indiegogo with flexible funding. According to Bartron, the campaign would be launched "in the coming days." However, this never happened, but the film has a page on FilmBreak The current status of the film is unknown as of November 2026.

In August 2014, Faerch's mother announced on Facebook that he would be taking a break from rapping to film a role "in the coming month". The project was later revealed to be Ditch Party by the film's official Facebook page. The film was met with negative consensus. Filmthreat.com describes his role as "he's an invisible presence for most of the first two acts, much-discussed but rarely encountered. That turns out to be for the better, because when he does finally cross paths with the holed-up main characters, he has a tendency toward monologues that wouldn't pass muster for a third-rate Walking Dead villain."

In 2015, Faerch's planned films were to include the Christian football/drug TV movie Lost in Oxyland as Dylan Jennings, the Daniel Baldwin Christian boxing drama Devotion as "Paul the Bartender", the drug thriller The Glass Circle as "The Weasel", a role in the Edward Furlong action-thriller Karma, a role in the thriller Amnesia, and the role of Devontae in the race-drama Peterson Park. As of July 2021, none of these films have been made.

In June 2015, writer-director Edward Burney Jr. launched an unsuccessful Kickstarter campaign for Peterson Park, along with an official website.

In 2016, Faerch had a minor voice role in Ben Affleck's The Accountant.

Faerch is featured in Blondie's music video for "Fun" from their 2017 album Pollinator.

In 2018, Faerch co-starred with Sophie Turner in the independent film, Josie. He also portrayed Mitch, a drug dealer, in the American teen drama series Euphoria in 2022.

In 2025, Faerch played a "dancing cheating manchild" in Sabrina Carpenter's music video for "Manchild."

== Acclaim ==
Faerch was named best minor character in Miami Herald's 2008 Movie Yearbook for his role in Hancock.

HorrorNews.net ranks Faerch among the all-time Top Ten Kids in Horror. 411Mania.com ranks Michael Myers as portrayed by Faerch and Tyler Mane as #5 on its list of the Top 8 Asylum Inmates.

== Personal life ==
Faerch was born on September 27, 1995 to burlesque dancer and actress Mickey Faerch.

== Filmography ==
Film
Year	Title	Role	Notes
2004	Seafood Heaven	Boy	
2004	Jill	Little Joshua	
2004	Earl's Your Uncle	Ratt	
2005	Frank's First Love	Frank	
2005	Andrew the Pirate	Tom	
2005	Life Ride	Billy	
2005	Lovin' Scoopful	Bully #1	
2005	Blind Doll	Mute Child	
2006	A Bullet Beyond Redemption	Young Daniel	
2006	Pedoefylé	Elvis Boy	
2006	Angry Ghost	Bernard	
2006	Waiting Room	Punk Kid	
2006	Coming to Town	Alasdair Romer	
2006	Interminal	Little Boy	
2007	Front	Jason	
2007	Lucky Numbers: A Musical	Junior	
2007	Dark Mirror	Neighbor Kid	
2007	Halloween	Michael Myers (age 10)	a.k.a. Rob Zombie's Halloween
2008	The Liar	Andy	
2008	Wreck the Halls	Charles	
2008	Digits	Matthew	
2008	Villa Nova	Brian	
2008	Hancock	Michel	a.k.a. "Hidden from Earth" in the Philippines
2008	Delaney	Hercules	
2008	Pushing Daisies	Ingmar Todd	2 episodes
2009	Family of Four	Joshua	
2009	Necromance	David	
2009	Run! Bitch Run!	Tommy	
2010	Sebastian	Sebastian	Premiered April 14, 2012 in Los Angeles
2010	Mental	Jesse	
2015	Ditch Party	The shooter	Released and available on Amazon.com and Tubi
2016	The Accountant	French bully	Voice only, uncredited
2018	Josie	Gator	Available on Amazon.com and Blu-ray
2019	Killer Therapy	Blake Corbin	
2022	Bury Me	David	Original title: I, Challenger. Available on Tubi.
TBD	Kink	Isaiah	Short film
TBD	Devotion	Paul	Pre-production
TBD	Emergence 2028	Drakken	In Production
TBD	Karma	Actor	Pre-production

Television
Year	Title	Role	Notes
2017	American Vandal	Tank Top Todd Watford	Episode: "Premature Theories"
2019	Now Apocalypse	Pink haired guy	Episode: "The Downward Spiral"
2020	The Bay	Adam Kenway	Episode: "A Bolt from the Blue"
2021	American Horror Story: Double Feature	Joey (as Daeg N. Faerch)	Episode: "Pale"
2022–2026	Euphoria	Mitch	6 episodes
2022–2026	NCIS	Alex Russo	Episode: "Fight or Flight"
2023	The Rookie	Decker Conroy	Episode: "The Con"

=== Music videos ===
Year	Title	Artist(s)
2017	"Fun"	Blondie
2025	"Manchild"	Sabrina Carpenter
