= Francesco Carnelutti (actor) =

Italian actor

- Born: 8 April 1936; Venice, Italy
- Died: 26 November 2015 (aged 79); Rome, Italy
- Occupation: Actor
- Years active: 1969–2014

Francesco Carnelutti (8 April 1936 – 26 November 2015) was an Italian actor. He appeared in more than sixty films from 1969 to 2014.

== Filmography ==
| Year | Title | Role | Notes |
|---|---|---|---|
| 1969 | The Lady of Monza | Cantastorie | |
| 1970 | La pacifista – Smetti di piovere | | |
| 1975 | Irene, Irene | Nino | |
| 1976 | Amore grande, amore libero | | |
| 1976 | Il maestro di violino | | |
| 1976 | Mimì Bluette... fiore del mio giardino | | |
| 1977 | Per questa notte | | |
| 1978 | Goodbye & Amen | Agostino | |
| 1979 | Concorde Affaire '79 | Co-Pilot – 2nd Concorde | |
| 1980 | Stark System | | |
| 1980 | Alexander the Great | Italian Anarchist | |
| 1981 | Priest of Love | Italian Reporter | |
| 1982 | Tomorrow We Dance | | |
| 1983 | Basileus Quartet | | |
| 1985 | The Assisi Underground | The Forester | |
| 1986 | L'ultima mazurka | Il sindaco | |
| 1986 | The Moro Affair | Secretary of the PCI | |
| 1987 | The Inquiry | | |
| 1987 | The Belly of an Architect | Pastarri | |
| 1987 | Barbablù, Barbablù | | |
| 1988 | Donna d'ombra | Tony | |
| 1991 | Ma non per sempre | Vigiu | |
| 1991 | Necessary Love | Doctor | |
| 1993 | Carillon | Il ciclista | |
| 1993 | Venti dal Sud | Juan | |
| 1994 | Ultimo confine | | |
| 1995 | L'estate di Bobby Charlton | The Professor | |
| 1995 | Favola contaminata | Contadino | |
| 1997 | A ridosso dei ruderi, i Trionfi | | |
| 1998 | Mare largo | Giovanni | |
| 2002 | Love Is Not Perfect | Doctor Melzi | |
| 2003 | Ilaria Alpi – Il più crudele dei giorni | | |
| 2003 | The Order | Dominic | |
| 2006 | Sfiorarsi | Regista | |
| 2006 | The Da Vinci Code | Prefect | |
| 2007 | Silk | Doctor | |
| 2007 | The Hideout | Dr. Moes | |
| 2009 | Imago Mortis | Astolfi | |
| 2014 | Spring | Angelo | |
| 2016 | The Young Messiah | Old Friend | |
