= Adam David Thompson =

American actor and producer

Adam David Thompson is an American actor known for his roles in Outsiders, Godless, Mozart in the Jungle, and others.

== Career ==
Thompson made his feature film debut opposite Elizabeth Olsen in thriller Martha Marcy May Marlene in 2011. This was followed up by supporting roles in A Walk Among the Tombstones and 10 Things I Hate About Life. He starred opposite Lucy Walters and Shane West in post-apocalyptic film, Here Alone which premiered at the 2016 Tribeca Film Festival and was released theatrically on March 30, 2017. The film received the Audience Award at the 2016 Tribeca Film Festival

== Filmography ==
=== Film ===
Year	Title	Role	Notes
2011	Martha Marcy May Marlene	Bartender	
2012	Saudade?	Manny	
2012	All Wifed Out	Fanny	
2013	+1	Kyle	
2014	A Walk Among the Tombstones	Albert	
2014	Moon and Sun	Patrick	
2014	10 Things I Hate About Life	Curt	
2015	Up the River	Willy	
2015	Keep in Touch	Officer Dugan	
2015	The Missing Girl	J. Lee	
2016	Here Alone	Chris	
2016	Diverge	Brad	
2017	Imitation Girl	Max	
2017	The Meyerowitz Stories	Brain	
2018	The Truth About Lies	Andy	
2018	Rosy	Eddie	
2019	Glass	Daryl	
2019	The Day Shall Come	Stevie Book	
2020	Vampires vs. the Bronx	Alexis	
2024	Things Will Be Different	Joseph	

=== Television ===
Year	Title	Role	Notes
2013	Deception	Paul	Episode: "Why Wait"
2014	America: A Love Song	Scott	Episode: "Road Trip"
2014	Unforgettable	Freddie Albertson	Episode: "Moving On"
2014	The Blacklist	Marcus	Episode: "Lord Baltimore (No. 104)"
2014–2016	Mozart in the Jungle	Craig G.	18 episodes
2015	Blindspot	Travis Robek	Episode: "Eight Slim Grins"
2017	Outsiders	Gordon Jerrod	6 episodes
2017	Godless	Gatz Brown	7 episodes
2018	Bull	Derrick Graham	Episode: "Absolution"
2018	The Sinner	Adam Lowry	3 episodes
2018	The Gifted	Graph	2 episodes
2019	Chicago P.D.	Billy Mays	Episode: "Ties that Bind"
2019	NCIS: New Orleans	Agent Harper	Episode: "Judgement Call
2020	A Teacher	Nate Wilson	4 episodes
2021	The Other Two	Pastor Jax Dag	Episode: "Chase Gets Baptized"

=== Video games ===
Year	Title	Role
2013	Grand Theft Auto V	Local Population
2018	Red Dead Redemption 2	The Local Pedestrian Population
