= Man Finds Tape =

2025 film directed by Paul Gandersman and Peter Hall

- Film poster
- Directed by: Paul Gandersman; Peter Hall
- Written by: Paul Gandersman; Peter Hall
- Produced by: Justin Benson; Aaron Moorhead; Ashley Landavazo; David Lawson Jr.
- Starring: Kelsey Pribilski; William Magnuson; John Gholson
- Production companies: Rustic Films; XYZ Films; Arcanum Pictures
- Distributed by: Magnet Releasing
- Release date: December 5, 2025
- Running time: 86 minutes
- Country: United States
- Language: English
- Box office: $11,139

Man Finds Tape is a 2025 American horror pseudo-documentary film written and directed by Paul Gandersman and Peter Hall. Justin Benson and Aaron Moorhead serve as two of its producers.

== Plot ==
Siblings Lynn and Lucas Page grew up in the small town of Larkin, Texas. Lynn moved away from Larkin years before, after the mysterious illness and death of their videographer parents, but returns to the town at the behest of Lucas, who reports strange phenomena occurring in the area. His conspiracy began with a VHS tape he found on the family property, depicting a mysterious figure entering their house in the middle of the night, hypnotizing him, and inserting an object into his mouth before departing. The video caused him to go viral online, and as he investigates the tape, he eventually suspects local reverend Endicott Carr as being responsible.

Lynn is initially unwilling to help, as she believes the video series and phenomena to be a hoax and had been harassed in public by Lucas's fans. However, she relents after Lucas is unreachable, and when she arrives at his home, she finds him catatonic while studying a video he had shown her over video chat, depicting CCTV footage of Larkin's main street, in which the pedestrians suddenly stop in place in a similar catatonic state which causes a van to hit and kill a pedestrian.

Witnesses reveal that they remember the death, but have no recollection of being present and, like Lucas, lose consciousness while watching the video, though Lynn is immune to the effects. The siblings send copies of the tapes in an attempt to find an explanation for the phenomenon, but forensic analysis determines nothing unusual about the tapes, save for a brief low note undetectable by humans. A breakthrough comes when Lynn studies Lucas's recording of one of Carr's sermons, during which another catatonic episode occurs. A stranger, unaffected by the phenomenon, gets up and leaves during the sermon. Wendy, Lucas's ex-girlfriend working as a surrogate for Carr, identifies him as a recent visitor and a patron of the local barbecue.

Lucas goes to the barbecue, and discovers the Stranger capturing the owner, Boon, with a strange hood that makes the latter instantly fall unconscious. While the Stranger works on a bound Boon, Lucas attacks the Stranger by using the hood against him before tying him up as well. Lynn and Wendy arrive to confront the Stranger with Lucas, who references knowledge about the occurrences around Larkin. Boon, Wendy, and Lucas fall unconscious, with Boon beginning to hemorrhage blood from the Stranger's wound, and Lynn is forced to release the Stranger so that he can keep Boon from dying. Boon pulls out a wormlike creature from a hole in Boon's back, explaining that "he's feeding" before leaving.

Lynn, Lucas, and Wendy gather at Lucas's house, and are soon interrupted by the Stranger. The Stranger tersely warns Lucas that his viral videos are putting him in danger before revealing the truth: the citizens of Larkin have been implanted with worms, which allow Carr, who hosts the controlling organism, to remotely feed on their blood. Upon learning that Wendy is pregnant with Carr's child, and that she does not have the holes in her body that Lucas and other Larkin residents do, he realizes that Carr gave her another organism and is feeding both their parasites. After being attacked by a possessed Wendy, he leaves, but later abducts her from her apartment.

Carr, sensing Wendy's peril, leaves to confront the Stranger where he is holding Wendy hostage, while Lucas and Lynn also race to help her. The Stranger reveals that he has come not to help the residents, but to take the controlling parasite for himself, dismissing Carr's offer to give him the townspeople (including Wendy) so long as the baby is safe. He slits Wendy's throat, but Carr uses his parasite to heal Wendy's wound from afar, and the Stranger takes the opportunity to steal Carr's parasite.

As a mortally wounded Carr escapes, Lynn chases the mutating Stranger out a nearby door, revealing a strange room with a descending spiral staircase that apparently hosts the being that birthed the parasites. However, she is forced to flee as the parasites begin to rise. Carr is later shown to collapse before bursting into flames, and the town returns to normal, though the Stranger is never seen again.

Wendy delivers the apparently normal baby and gives him up for adoption. Lynn and Lucas find a trove of Carr's tapes, revealing that he indeed planted the parasites in the residents, including Lynn, and she cannot explain why she was immune, nor The Stranger's coded journals and hood (which has lost its power). She does surmise that Carr had been feeding on Larkin's residents in the middle of the night, undetected, but had to start extra feedings in the day for the benefit of Wendy's child; that Carr engineered events to draw Wendy to him to be his surrogates; and that her parents, who had helped set up Carr's recording equipment, were deliberately sickened and killed by Carr to cover his tracks, but that they suspected his motives and saved the tape that Lucas eventually discovered so that the truth would be uncovered one day.

== Cast ==
- Kelsey Pribilski as Lynn Page
  - Kennedy Jo Wilson as Young Lynn Page
- William Magnuson as Lucas Page
  - Fox Manning as Young Lucas Page
- John Gholson as Reverend Endicott Carr
- Brian Villalobos as The Stranger
- Nell Kessler as Wendy Parker
- Graham Skipper as Winston Boon
- Judy McMillan as Abagail
- Christine Hall as Joelle Cantor
- Akasha Villalobos as Holly Page
- Shane Brady as Richard Page
- Mia King as Model

== Production ==
Man Finds Tape is the first feature film made by writer-directors Paul Gandersman and Peter Hall. The film received an original score by Jimmy LaValle. The runtime is 84 minutes.

== Release ==
Magnet Releasing distributed the film in a limited theatrical run and on-demand platforms in the United States on December 5, 2025.

== Reception ==
On review aggregator Rotten Tomatoes, 83% of 46 critics gave Man Finds Tape a positive review, with an average rating of 6.9/10; the website's critical consensus reads: "Man Finds Tape is a smart, slow-burning directorial debut that delivers layered, imaginative horror with strong performances and compelling mysteries." On Metacritic, the film has a weighted average score of 70 out of 100 based on 4 critics.

Brian Tallerico of RogerEbert.com gave the film 3 stars out of 4, commenting that "one of the best things about [the film] is how it incorporates other horror voices into the mix, including body horror that feels inspired by David Cronenberg and even a few scenes that reminded me of the Lovecraftian forces at play in John Carpenter’s Prince of Darkness". Jim Vorel of Paste gave the film a positive review, calling it "a startlingly creative and skillfully assembled little movie." Dennis Harvey of Variety was less enthusiastic, saying that viewers "may find the fadeout less than satisfying."
