= Things Will Be Different =

2024 film by Michael Felker

- Theatrical release poster
- Directed by: Michael Felker
- Written by: Michael Felker
- Produced by: Shane Spiegel; Jacob Rosenthal; Michael Felker
- Starring: Adam David Thompson; Riley Dandy
- Cinematography: Carissa Dorson
- Edited by: Michael Felker; Rebeca Marques
- Music by: Jimmy LaValle; Michael A. Muller
- Production companies: XYZ Films; Rustic Films; Last Life
- Distributed by: Magnet Releasing
- Release dates: March 11, 2024 (SXSW); October 4, 2024 (United States)
- Running time: 102 minutes
- Country: United States
- Language: English
- Box office: $9,134

Things Will Be Different is a 2024 American science fiction thriller film written and directed by Michael Felker in his directorial debut. It stars Adam David Thompson and Riley Dandy as brother and sister robbers who use time travel to lay low after their crimes. The film premiered at the 2024 South by Southwest festival on March 11, 2024, and was released on October 4, 2024, by Magnet Releasing.

== Plot ==
Estranged siblings Joseph and Sidney reunite at a restaurant with $7m in cash following a botched robbery. Joseph has made plans for the two to lay low at a remote farmhouse which apparently contains a closet with the ability to transport occupants into an alternative timeline if they follow instructions in a notebook.

At the farmhouse, with the police closing in, Joseph and Sidney locate the closet and follow the instructions. The process works, and the two leave the closet to find themselves in another timeline but find a nearby church and flour mill mysteriously locked. The notebook instructs them to wait fourteen days before re-entering the closet to return to the present. Sidney reluctantly waits, expressing her desire to return to the present to reunite with her young daughter, Steph. Later, whilst reminiscing about their childhood, Sidney recalls a disco track their mother used to play.

On the fourteenth day, Sidney finds the closet barricaded. Joseph discovers the mill unlocked and finds a decomposed body in the basement, along with a warning informing them they are now stuck in a timeline 'vise' and inviting them to sign the warning in order to comply.

Sidney attempts to flee but becomes violently sick forcing her to return. With no other option, Joseph signs the warning which causes a safe to instantly appear before them. Joseph unlocks the safe and finds a tape recorder which allows the two to record messages and listen to responses from a stranger.

The stranger questions their reasons for being there and states he intends to wipe any trace of their existence to protect the delicate balance of the farmhouse's abilities. He informs them the only way to escape alive is to stay at the farmhouse and kill a mysterious visitor who will arrive at some unknown point in the future.

Joseph and Sidney keep watch at the farmhouse for a year, waiting for the visitor to arrive. One day, the hooded visitor arrives and wounds Joseph. The visitor uses a portable speaker to play Sidney's mother's disco track, before wounding Sidney who retreats into the farmhouse. Finding the closet blocked again, she communicates again with the stranger through the tape recorder who warns her not to break in.

Joseph wakes to find himself inside the church with the visitor. The visitor, unable to talk, forces Joseph to speak to the stranger via the tape recorder and pretend that he has been successful in killing the visitor. Wanting proof of the visitor's death, Joseph tells the stranger he left the body outside due to bad weather. The visitor reveals in writing to Joseph that they are looking for the man who killed their family.

After forcing the visitor to flee, Sidney unmasks the visitor following a violent confrontation and discovers the visitor is her daughter Steph, now an adult. As Joseph arrives, Sidney attempts to protect Steph. Joseph, however, accidentally shoots and kills Sidney. Steph flees through the closet door.

Joseph, now alone, uses the tape recorder to inform the stranger that the visitor has left. Joseph buries Sidney before following instructions from the stranger to wait inside the mill. Joseph is soon transported to an unknown location, where he encounters the stranger from the tape recorder, along with a woman. The two ask Joseph to remember any information about the visitor, but Joseph is unable to.

The two inform Joseph that he and Sidney failed to follow their instructions and as a result are going to have all trace of their existence wiped. Joseph begs to be given one last chance to travel back to save Sidney and rectify his mistakes. The man and woman agree and transport Joseph back to the first day before he meets Sidney at the restaurant, while advising him that he will have to eliminate his own copy in that timeline – referred to as the 'redundancy' – in order to take his place.

Back at the restaurant from the beginning, it is revealed that a visibly aged Joseph has repeated the cycle of the events of the film numerous times. Unable to prevent himself from accidentally killing Sidney, he tells Sidney the only way to stop the cycle is for her to kill him at the restaurant, and to leave the money and return to her daughter. Sidney shoots Joseph and flees the restaurant as police sirens are heard approaching.

== Cast ==
- Adam David Thompson as Joseph
- Riley Dandy as Sidney
- Chloe Skoczen as The Visitor
- Justin Benson as Vice Grip Left
- Sarah Bolger as Vice Grip Right
- Jori Lynn Felker as Waitress

== Production ==
It was directed by Michael Felker, who also wrote the screenplay. According to Felker, he was inspired, among other things, by the films Looper by Rian Johnson and Blood Simple by the Coen brothers. Adam David Thompson and Riley Dandy play siblings Joseph and Sidney. Originally, filming was going to take place on Felker's abandoned family farm in Michigan, but poor conditions forced production to pivot to the Mill District farm in Indiana a month before production. Justin Benson and Aaron Moorhead executive produced the film through their Rustic Films label after working with Felker in his role as editor on many of their prior films.

Former guitarist of the US post-rock band Tristeza Jimmy LaValle and multi-instrumentalist Michael A. Muller contributed the film music.

== Release ==
Things Will Be Different had its world premiere on March 11, 2024, at the South by Southwest festival in Austin, Texas. It also screened at the Overlook Film Festival on April 5, 2024. It was given a simultaneous release to streaming platforms and in theaters on October 4, 2024, by Magnet Releasing.

== Reception ==
=== Box office ===
In the United States and Canada, the film made $3,988 from twenty-three theaters in its opening weekend.

=== Critical response ===
On the review aggregator website Rotten Tomatoes, 81% of 52 critics' reviews are positive, with an average rating of 7.2/10. The website's consensus reads: "A small film brimming with big ideas, Things Will Be Different effectively teases the brain while shredding the nerves." Metacritic, which uses a weighted average, assigned the film a score of 62 out of 100, based on 5 critics, indicating "generally favorable" reviews.

Carlos Aguilar, writing for Variety, describes the film as "an impressive attempt to blend emotional depth with intellectual intrigue" in Things Will Be Different.
