= Josie (film) =

2018 American thriller drama film

- Theatrical release poster
- Directed by: Eric England
- Written by: Anthony Ragnone II
- Produced by: Luisa Iskin; Johnny Wunder; Kevin Matusow; Jeff Kalligheri
- Starring: Sophie Turner; Dylan McDermott; Jack Kilmer; Micah Fitzgerald; Lombardo Boyar; Daeg Faerch; Robin Bartlett; Kurt Fuller
- Cinematography: Zoë White
- Edited by: Paul Matthew Gordon
- Music by: Raney Shockne
- Production companies: Waterstone Entertainment; Coalition Group; The Traveling Picture Show Company; Boo Pictures
- Distributed by: Screen Media Films
- Release dates: February 8, 2018 (Mammoth); March 16, 2018 (United States)
- Running time: 87 minutes
- Country: United States
- Language: English

Josie (also known as Huntsville) is a 2018 American thriller drama film directed by Eric England and written by Anthony Ragnone II. The film stars Sophie Turner as the titular character, a mysterious high school student who transfers to the Southern town of Baymont, where she draws the attention of local recluse Hank (Dylan McDermott). The film also stars Jack Kilmer, Micah Fitzgerald, Lombardo Boyar, Daeg Faerch, Robin Bartlett, and Kurt Fuller. Josie premiered at Mammoth Film Festival on February 8, 2018, and was released in the United States by Screen Media Films on March 16, 2018.

== Plot ==
Hank lives at the Pink Motel and works as a guard at the high school. He enjoys fishing and raising his tortoises. He occasionally sees a vision of a man in an orange prison jumpsuit.

One day a pretty teenage girl named Josie asks for help moving into the motel. She starts class at the school where Hank works and is assigned a project where students work in pairs. She makes friends with Marcus and they agree to work together, to the dismay of Marcus' best friend Gator. Marcus and Josie spend time together, and not just on school work.

Hank is friends with Josie, but because of the age difference, neighbor Martha criticizes his relationship. But Hank does not seem to think of Josie in that way. He and Marcus do not get along, partly because Hank harasses Marcus and his friends at school.

One day while they are together, Hank tells Josie his story. He was a guard at the Huntsville, Texas prison, where he was one of those who tied down prisoners about to be executed. Years later, one of the inmates was found innocent, and this haunted him to the point where he had to quit his job and move elsewhere.

Josie wants Hank and Marcus to get along, so she invites them to come together and talk out their differences and drink. As Hank talks about fishing, Marcus says he likes to hunt, and he pulls out a knife that he uses. Hank passes out and remembers the day the prisoner of his visions was executed. Watching the event is a little girl.

When Hank wakes up he is tied up. Josie explains she was that little girl and her father was innocent and she wants revenge. It does not matter that Hank feels remorse. She cuts his throat. The cops show up, and Hank as the narrator says Marcus was framed for Hank's murder.

Josie has different hair as she travels to Huntsville. She meets one of the prison guards in a bar.

== Cast ==
- Sophie Turner as Josie
- Dylan McDermott as Hank
- Jack Kilmer as Marcus
- Kurt Fuller as Gordie
- Robin Bartlett as Martha
- Daeg Faerch as Gator
- Lombardo Boyar as Romeo
- Micah Fitzgerald as the Long-Haired Man
- Jennifer Prediger as Ms. Elkins
- Mickey Faerch as Gator's Mom
- Matthew Gallagher as Murray

== Production ==
Anthony Ragnone II's original script for the film, then titled Huntsville, was voted to the 2014 Black List, a list of the year's most popular unproduced screenplays. During the Toronto International Film Festival in September 2015, the Coalition Group announced the beginning of development for the film with the casting of Shea Whigham as Hank and Anya Taylor-Joy as Josie. By August 2016, Whigham and Taylor-Joy had been replaced with Dylan McDermott and Sophie Turner, respectively, and Jack Kilmer was also added to the cast. Filming began that same month in Los Angeles. The film's title was changed from Huntsville to Josie ahead of its premiere at the Mammoth Film Festival. The film's North American distribution rights were acquired by Screen Media Films in January 2018, also ahead of its premiere, with international distribution being acquired by Lightning Entertainment.

== Release ==
Josie premiered as the opening film of the inaugural Mammoth Film Festival on February 8, 2018. The film received a simultaneous release on March 16, 2018, with a limited theatrical run and video on demand releases.

=== Critical response ===
On Rotten Tomatoes the film has an approval rating of 13% based on reviews from eight critics, with an average rating of 4.4/10. On Metacritic, it has a weighted average score of 31 out of 100, based on reviews from 6 critics, indicating "generally unfavorable" reviews.

Sheri Linden of The Hollywood Reporter wrote: "At various moments throughout the movie, Turner and McDermott suggest something far more complicated and messy than the noir-tinged exercise that unfolds."

Nick Schager of Variety Magazine criticizes the film, writing that it: "spends so much time trying to resemble a film noir that its refusal to engage in actual film noir business proves downright exasperating, a situation compounded by the eventual revelations it has in store."
