= Run! Bitch Run! =

- Directed by: Joseph Guzman
- Written by: Robert James Hayes II; Joseph Guzman
- Produced by: Joseph Guzman; Robert James Hayes II
- Starring: Cheryl Lyone; Peter Tahoe; Christina DeRosa; Daeg Faerch
- Cinematography: Robert James Hayes II
- Edited by: Joseph Guzman; Robert James Hayes II
- Music by: Chris Mosqueda; Ryan Shivdasani; Warren O. Williams
- Production company: Freak Show Entertainment
- Release date: 2009
- Running time: 90 minutes
- Country: United States
- Language: English

Run! Bitch Run! is a 2009 American rape and revenge film emulating the style of exploitation films. It follows two Catholic schoolgirls who, selling religious paraphernalia door-to-door to fund their education, are brutally raped and left for dead. One of them, surviving the affair, returns with a shotgun to exact revenge on her tormentors.
