= Lucy Walters =

American actress

- Citizenship: American
- Occupation: Actress
- Years active: 2008–present
- Known for: Portraying Holly Weaver on Power
- Website: iG.com/lucywalters

Lucy Walters is an American actress best known for playing the role of Holly Weaver on Power on the Starz network for the first three seasons.

== Career ==
Walters starred as Ann in the 2016 horror film Here Alone and played Holly on the crime-drama television series Power.

In 2022, Walters starred as Nora Murray in the Neil LaBute film House of Darkness. In 2023, she was cast as a lead in The Snare, an indie dramatic thriller, alongside Cassady McClincy, Dempsey Bryk, and Royce Johnson.

== Filmography ==
=== Film ===
Year	Title	Role	Notes
2009	Dumping Lisa	Allison Dunn	
2009	Romeo Vs. Juliet	Juliet	Short
2011	Prickles	Beth	Short
2011	Better than Nothing	Rachel Benson	Short
2011	Shame	Woman on Subway Train	
2012	Beds Made & Sweaters On	Christine	Short
2012	The Brass Teapot	Mary	
2013	Big Words	Shiela	
2013	Double Crossed	Waitress	Short
2013	The Proprietor	The Blonde	Short
2013	Epilogue	Veronica	Short
2013	B-Side	Katie	
2013	Bastards of Young	Julie	
2013	Big Girl	Mom	Short
2014	Lies I Told My Little Sister	Cory Webber	
2014	Growing Up and Other Lies	Melanie	
2014	The Grey Matter	Emily Eaton	Short
2014	The Longest Week	Ivory House Girl #2	
2015	Up Here	Mother	Short
2015	Up Next	Emma	Short
2015	Cry Baby Cry	-	Short
2016	Here Alone	Ann	
2016	Monsterland	Emily	
2016	Auld Lang Syne	Sadie	
2017	Tiny Mammals	Carol (Mom)	Short
2018	Boarding School	Mrs. Ramsay	
2018	This Teacher	Rose	
2018	Progress Bar	Lexi	Short
2019	Entangled	Isabel	
2020	Tesla	Katherine Johnson	
2020	Thorp	Rachel	
2020	I've Lost Her	Rose	Short
2021	False Positive	Marcy	
2022	House of Darkness	Nora Murray	
2022	The Falling World	Margot	
2025	The Snare	Faye	
2026	The Schopenhauer Effect	Pam	

=== Television ===
Year	Title	Role	Notes
2008	Lipstick Jungle	Woman	Episode: "Chapter Eighteen: Indecent Exposure"
2011	Blue Bloods	Vanessa	Episode: "My Funny Valentine"
2011	Gossip Girl	Member of Couple	Episode: "The Wrong Goodbye"
2011	Army Wives	Amy Sandberg	Episode: "Firefight" & "Farewell to Arms"
2012	White Collar	Annie Chaite	Episode: "Pulling Strings"
2012	Smash	Suzanne	Episode: "The Callback"
2012	Futurestates	Gunny	Episode: "Gunny"
2012	Splinter Cell: Extinction	Brin	Recurring Cast
2012	666 Park Avenue	Mary Barlow	Episode: "Pilot"
2012	The Good Wife	Sandy	Episode: "Here Comes the Judge"
2013	Do No Harm	Bethany Mitchell	Episode: "A Stand-In"
2013	Bones	Lily Thorn	Episode: "The Secrets in the Proposal"
2014	Rizzoli & Isles	Natalie Bloomfield	Episode: "You're Gonna Miss Me When I'm Gone"
2014–16	Power	Holly Weaver	Main Cast: Season 1-3
2015	Highly Evolved Human	Elizabeth	Episode: "The Scooter"
2016	Falling Water	Isla	Recurring Cast: Season 1
2017	Z: The Beginning of Everything	Edna St. Vincent Millay	Recurring Cast
2017–19	Get Shorty	Katie Daly	Main Cast: Season 1-2, Recurring Cast: Season 3
2018	#WarGames	Anne Sawyer	Recurring Cast
2018	NCIS: New Orleans	Amy Collins	Episode: "High Stakes"
2019	Jett	Rosalie	Recurring Cast
2019	Law & Order: Special Victims Unit	Tammy Miller	Episode: "The Burden of Our Choices"
2020–21	Group	Pam	Recurring Cast: Season 1, Main Cast: Season 2
2021	FBI: Most Wanted	Amelia Cartwright	Episode: "Dysfunction"
2022	Winning Time: The Rise of the Lakers Dynasty	Beverly	Episode: "Is That All There Is?"
2022	The Blacklist	Felicia Dawson	Episode: "The Chairman (No. 171)"
2022	The Rookie	Beth Veston	Episode: "Double Down"
2023	Power Book IV: Force	Holly Weaver	Episode: "Here There Be Monsters"

== Awards and nominations ==
Year	Award ceremony	Category	Recipient/Nominated work	Results	Ref.
2016	Tallgrass Film Festival	Golden Strands Award – Outstanding Female Actor	Here Alone; herself	Won	
2014	Lady Filmmakers Film Festival	Best Actress	Herself (Lies I Told My Little Sister)	Nominated	
