= Justin Benson and Aaron Moorhead =

American filmmaking duo

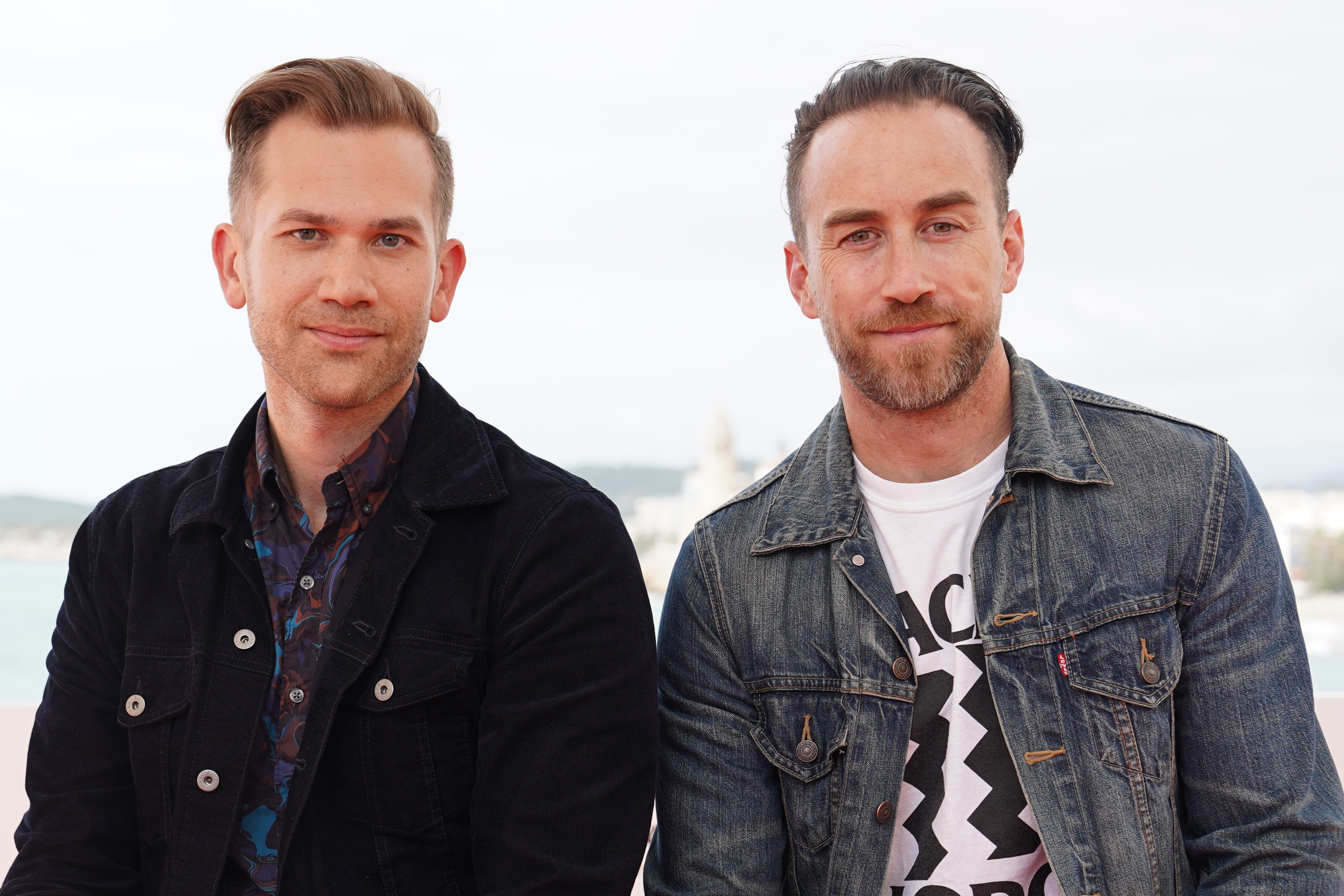
- Benson (right) and Moorhead (left) in 2019
- Born: Justin Benson; June 9, 1983 (age 43); San Diego, California, US Aaron Scott Moorhead; March 3, 1987 (age 39); Tampa, Florida, US
- Occupations: Film and television directors; producers; editors
- Years active: 2012–present

Justin Benson (born June 9, 1983) and Aaron Scott Moorhead (born March 3, 1987) are an American filmmaking duo. Both have served in directing, producing, editing, and acting roles in their projects, while Moorhead is also a cinematographer and Benson is a writer. Their films primarily center around science fiction or horror elements. The duo have also contributed to several television series within the Marvel Cinematic Universe.

== Personal lives ==
Justin Benson was born on June 9, 1983, in San Diego, California, United States. Aaron Moorhead grew up in Tarpon Springs, Florida and attended Palm Harbor University High School.

As a child, Benson was a fan of the Marvel Comics character Daredevil which later informed his contributions to several Marvel Cinematic Universe television series, notably Daredevil: Born Again.

== Careers ==
Both directed shorts and commercials early in their careers, with Moorhead directing his first film at 19 years old.

Their first film, the 2012 horror film Resolution, was screened at the 2012 Tribeca Film Festival. They described their partnership as purely collaborative and cast the lead actors after working with them in previous commercials they had worked on. Their follow up, the 2014 romantic body horror film Spring, premiered at the 2014 Toronto International Film Festival. The film was publicly praised by both Richard Linklater and Guillermo del Toro. The pair's work can also be found in the horror anthology film V/H/S: Viral in the segment entitled "Bonestorm". Their film The Endless premiered in competition at the Tribeca Film Festival in 2017, and was theatrically released in 2018 by Well Go USA Entertainment. The Endless, alongside their 2019 film Synchronic which premiered at the 2019 Toronto International Film Festival, are in the same shared universe as Resolution. Amid the COVID-19 pandemic, the duo created and starred in Something in the Dirt which was shot in Benson's apartment due to restrictions on the film industry at the time. They describe their films as naturalistic and grounded, despite the science fiction or horror elements.

In television, Benson and Moorhead have contributed to multiple Marvel Cinematic Universe television series. After directing two episodes of Moon Knight (2022), which according to executives at Marvel Studios went "so smoothly," the duo were quickly recruited as lead directors of the second season of Loki (2023). In 2023, after a significant creative reshuffle on Daredevil: Born Again, the two were hired as lead directors and executive producers, and, alongside new showrunner Dario Scardapane, reworked the storyline and structure of the planned first and second seasons. Benson and Moorhead are credited with directing three episodes in the show's first season (2025), and contributed to the already-completed other six episodes. They returned as lead directors in the second season (2026), directing the first two episodes of the season. Ethan Hawke and Vincent D'Onofrio, stars of Moon Knight and Daredevil: Born Again respectively, both praised the filmmaking team for their direction on set and creative decisions.

=== Production company ===
In 2017, Benson and Moorhead, alongside their producing partner David Lawson Jr., founded the film production company Rustic Films.

Benson, Moorhead, and Lawson Jr., via their Rustic Films production banner, either produced or executive produced many of their own films as well as the films After Midnight (2019), She Dies Tomorrow (2020), Separation (2020), Pruning (2023), Things Will Be Different (2024), Descendent (2025), Touch Me (2025), and Man Finds Tape (2025).

== Filmography ==
=== Film ===
Year	Title	Director	Producer	Writer	Editor	DoP	Notes
2010	A Glaring Emission	Moorhead	No	Moorhead	Moorhead	No	
2012	Resolution	Yes	Yes	Benson	Yes	Moorhead	
2014	V/H/S: Viral	Yes	Yes	Benson	Yes	Moorhead	Segment "Bonestorm"
2014	Spring	Yes	Yes	Benson	Yes	Moorhead	
2017	The Endless	Yes	Yes	Benson	Yes	Moorhead	
2019	Synchronic	Yes	Yes	Benson	Yes	Moorhead	
2022	Something in the Dirt	Yes	Yes	Benson	Yes	Moorhead	

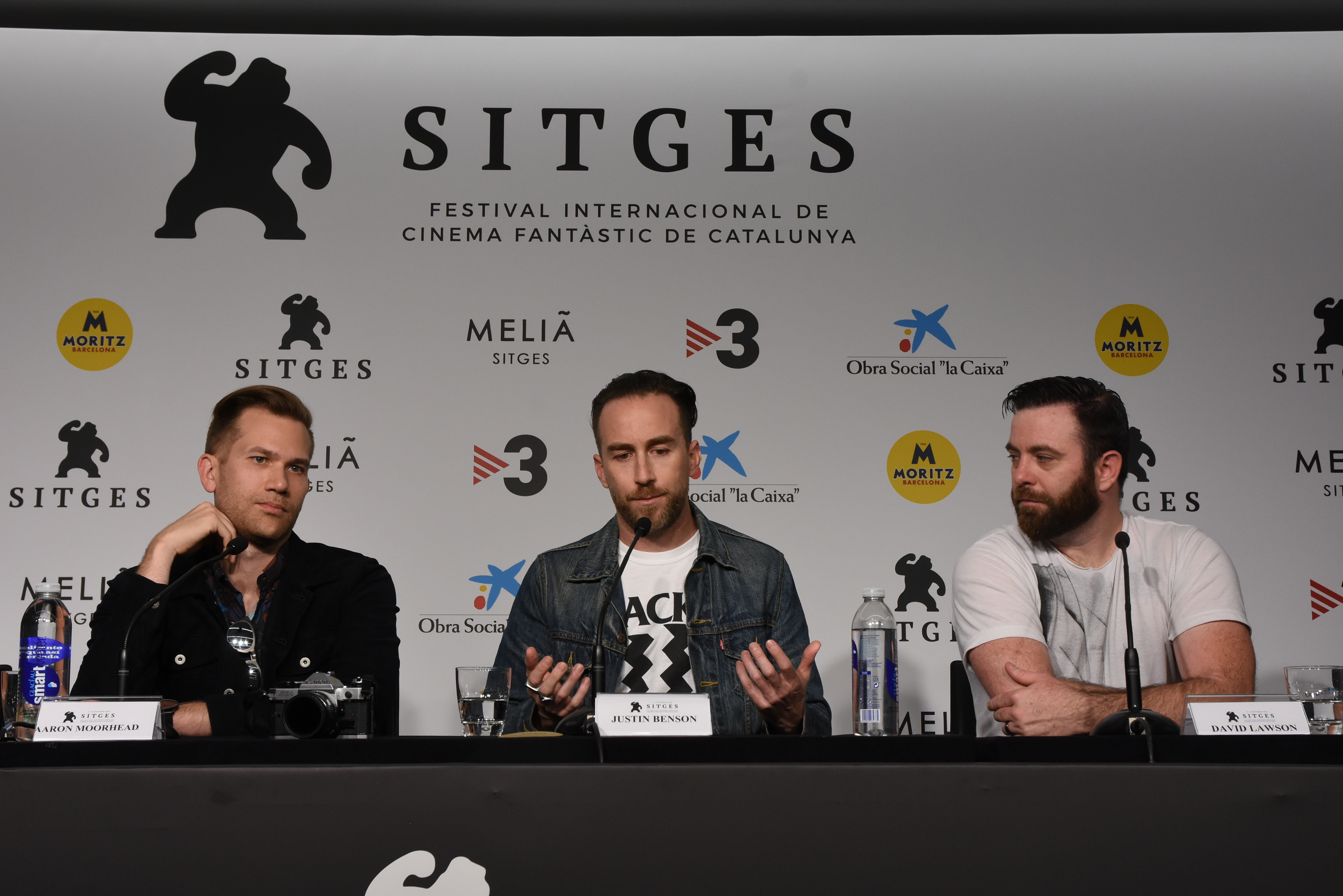
Moorhead and Benson, alongside Rustic Films partner David Lawson, at the Sitges Film Festival in 2019.

Producing credits through Rustic Films

- After Midnight (2019)
- She Dies Tomorrow (2020)
- Separation (2020) (Short film)
- Pruning (2023) (Short film)
- Things Will Be Different (2024) (Executive producer)
- Touch Me (2025) (Executive producer)
- Man Finds Tape (2025)
- Wild Magic (2025) (Documentary)
- Descendent (2025)

Acting roles

Year	Title	Role	
Year	Title	Benson	Moorhead
2012	Resolution	Justin	Aaron
2014	V/H/S: Viral	Rollerblading marine	Rollerblading marine's buddy
2015	Contracted: Phase II	Handsome officer	Less handsome officer
2015	Dementia	Nurse Hollings	—N/a
2017	The Endless	Justin	Aaron
2019	After Midnight	Shane	—N/a
2020	Separation	Mark	—N/a
2022	Something in the Dirt	Levi	John
2022	Breathing Happy	Lotus; Soothing yoga voice	The golden door
2024	Things Will Be Different	Vice Grip Left	—N/a

=== Television ===
Year	Title	Director	Executive producer	Notes
2020	The Twilight Zone	Yes	No	Episode "8"
2022	Archive 81	Yes	No	Episodes "Terror in the Aisles" and "Spirit Receivers"
2022	Moon Knight	Yes	No	Episodes "Summon the Suit" and "The Tomb"
2023	Loki	Yes	Yes	Directed 4 episodes; credited as "Lead Directors" (second season only)
2025–2027	Daredevil: Born Again	Yes	Yes	Directed 5 episodes; credited as "Lead Directors"

Acting roles

Year	Title	Role		Notes
Year	Title	Benson	Moorhead	Notes
2023	Loki	John Anglin	Clarence Anglin	Episode "Science/Fiction"
2025	Daredevil: Born Again	—N/a	Bystander	Episode "Heaven's Half Hour"
