= Something in the Dirt =

- Release poster
- Directed by: Justin Benson; Aaron Moorhead
- Written by: Justin Benson
- Produced by: David Lawson Jr.; Aaron Moorhead; Justin Benson
- Starring: Justin Benson; Aaron Moorhead
- Cinematography: Aaron Moorhead
- Edited by: Michael Felker; Justin Benson; Aaron Moorhead
- Music by: Jimmy LaValle
- Production company: Rustic Films
- Distributed by: XYZ Films
- Release dates: January 23, 2022 (Sundance); November 4, 2022 (United States)
- Running time: 116 minutes
- Country: United States
- Language: English

Something in the Dirt is a 2022 American science fiction comedy horror film directed by and starring Justin Benson and Aaron Moorhead. Written by Benson, it is the fifth feature film by the directing duo.

The film had its world premiere online at the 2022 Sundance Film Festival in January 2022.

== Plot ==
A man wakes up in a small, dirty apartment. Conversations with a neighbor establish that this man is named Levi, a spear-fisher and worker at odd jobs. The neighbor, John, is a sometime math teacher who attends an evangelical apocalyptic church. Together the pair notice that objects made of quartz sometimes float and glow supernaturally in their apartment, revealing a certain symbol, and various lights, noises, tremors and radio signals can be heard.

The pair work together to create a documentary film about this phenomenon, following up on clues and coincidences that begin to occur all over Los Angeles related to it. At several points, Levi suggests to John that the pursuit has become dangerous and recommends stopping, but John rushes ahead heedlessly. John often maligns Levi's theories in favor of his own, constantly-changing ones, and begins to display signs of sociopathy and pathological lying, ignoring clear signs of danger (sudden radiation burns, impossible plant growth, etc.).

Eventually, the two men have an argument. That night, John wakes up floating in the air and falls back into bed. He goes outside to see Levi floating high in the sky. Documentary-style interview scenes see John explaining that Levi died as a result, his mangled body discovered near a house the pair investigated earlier, surrounded by unnatural totems and containing a blacked-out manuscript. An interviewer asks John to explain the supernatural phenomena. John only says that his calculations were off and refuses to elaborate further, still determined to finish the documentary.

== Cast ==
- Justin Benson as Levi
- Aaron Moorhead as John

== Production ==
Benson and Moorhead conceived of the film during the 2020 COVID-19 lockdowns. It was shot over the course of a year with a crew of 12. Benson's own apartment served as the primary location of the film.

== Reception ==
On the review aggregator website Rotten Tomatoes, 91% of 75 critics' reviews are positive, with an average rating of 7.6/10. The website's consensus reads: "Something in the Dirt reaffirms Justin Benson and Aaron Moorhead as sci-fi storytellers with a distinctive—and darkly alluring—vision." Metacritic, which uses a weighted average, assigned the film a score of 76 out of 100, based on 25 critics, indicating "generally favorable" reviews.
