= Spring (2014 film) =

- Theatrical release poster
- Directed by: Justin Benson; Aaron Moorhead
- Written by: Justin Benson
- Produced by: Justin Benson; Aaron Moorhead; David Clarke Lawson, Jr.
- Starring: Lou Taylor Pucci; Nadia Hilker; Francesco Carnelutti; Nick Nevern
- Cinematography: Aaron Moorhead
- Edited by: Justin Benson; Aaron Moorhead; Michael Felker
- Music by: Jimmy LaValle
- Production company: XYZ Films
- Distributed by: Drafthouse Films; FilmBuff
- Release dates: September 5, 2014 (TIFF); March 20, 2015 (United States)
- Running time: 109 minutes
- Countries: Italy; United States
- Language: English
- Box office: $49,970

Spring is a 2014 romantic science fiction horror film directed by Justin Benson and Aaron Moorhead and starring Lou Taylor Pucci and Nadia Hilker. The film follows Evan, a young man who travels to Italy and pursues a woman named Louise who, unknown to Evan, is not entirely human.

Spring premiered at the Toronto International Film Festival on September 5, 2014, before receiving a limited theatrical release through Drafthouse Films on March 20, 2015. The film received positive reviews from critics and grossed $49,970 worldwide.

== Plot ==
Evan Russell, a young American man, loses his mother to cancer. After her funeral, he gets into a physical altercation at the restaurant where he works and loses his job. On his friend's advice, Evan travels to Italy, where he meets a flirtatious girl named Louise. Interested in pursuing a relationship with her, he starts living in a small town in southern Italy, working at a local farm.

Louise, who initially rejected Evan, finally has sex with him without using a condom. The next morning, she wakes up before he does and has a monstrous appearance. After leaving, she kills a cat. After a few dates where they explore the town together, Louise asks Evan about his family. Although he is reluctant to reveal details, he relents and asks Louise to tell him something about her. Louise takes out a contact lens from her right eye to show Evan that she has heterochromia. Evan sees the same condition reflected in the women on many of the paintings in the museum and also on the cover of a book. One night, Louise is having dinner with Evan when her skin condition becomes worse. She runs off the street and is followed by a tourist who mistakes her for a prostitute. Louise unwillingly kills him after she mutates into a reptilian creature.

Evan, who has been working illegally on the farm, has to leave when immigration police arrive. With nowhere else to go, he visits Louise's house. The door is chain-locked, through which he sees blood on the floor and hears a strange voice. He breaks the chain to open the door and finds an octopus-like creature on the floor wearing Louise's dress, trying to reach a syringe. He quickly picks up the syringe and injects it into the creature's neck.

Louise reveals to Evan that she is a 2,000-year-old mutant. She is the woman in all of the paintings of women with heterochromia. Every 20th spring, she finds a man to impregnate her, and her body uses cells in the embryo to recreate herself in a new body which contains the man's DNA. While this process is underway, she changes into various creatures which were part of human's evolutionary lineage. Shocked, Evan leaves. Louise follows him and tells him more about the condition. She reveals that she avoided using a condom during intercourse to purposely get pregnant. She also reveals that if she falls in love, the hormones will stop the process and turn her mortal. Evan asks if she is in love with him; she replies she is not and would not give up her immortality for anyone.

Evan asks her to spend her last 24 hours with him before she re-evolves. They spend all night talking to each other. In the early morning, Louise takes Evan to the ruins of Pompeii, where she was born, and tells him her family history. The time comes, and Evan makes one last attempt begging her not to change. Louise says she has no control over it and warns that she may attack him. He refuses to go, so Louise lies down with her head on his lap and listens to Evan talk about the experience of being mortal and all its positive aspects. As the sun rises, Evan calmly looks down at Louise as he hears a grotesque sound. However, he finds Louise still in her current human form while Mount Vesuvius, the volcano that resulted in the death of Louise's family, erupts in the background.

== Cast ==
- Lou Taylor Pucci as Evan Russell
- Nadia Hilker as Louise
- Francesco Carnelutti as Angelo
- Nick Nevern as Thomas
- Chris Palko as Bancroft Dawson
- Jonathan Silvestri as Sam
- Jeremy Gardner as Tommy
- Vinny Curran as Mike
- Holly Hawkins as Nicole Russell, Evan's Mom
- Augie Duke as Jackie
- Vanessa Bednar as Gail
- Shane Brady as Brad

== Soundtrack ==
The soundtrack was composed by Jimmy Lavalle and was released on March 25, 2015, by Lavalle's own label, Eastern Glow Recordings.

== Release ==
Spring premiered on September 5, 2014, as part of the Toronto International Film Festival. The film received a limited theatrical release on March 20, 2015, through Drafthouse Films and a video on demand release a day later through FilmBuff.

=== Critical reception ===
Rotten Tomatoes, a review aggregator, reports that 85% of 60 surveyed critics gave the film a positive review; the average score is 7.40/10. The site's critics' consensus states: "Rich in atmosphere and intelligence, Spring is a singular horror film with a sneaky, lingering impact." On Metacritic, the film has a rating of 70/100 from 13 critics, indicating "generally favorable" reviews.

Jon Dickinson of SCREAM: The Horror Magazine gave Spring a 5-star rating, stating that it "transcends all genres to deliver a story that feels entirely unique… a monster you won’t want to miss".

Mexican filmmaker Guillermo del Toro has highly praised the film, stating that "[Spring] is one of the best horror films of this decade". He added that it is one of the only Lovecraftian films "that has blown me away".

At the Austin Fantastic Fest, it won the Next Wave Award for Lou Taylor Pucci as Best Actor. At the Palm Springs International Film Festival, it won Directors to Watch for Benson and Moorhead.
