= Well Go USA Entertainment =

American and international film distributor

- Industry: Film distribution
- Genre: Action; Independent; International
- Founded: 1989; 37 years ago
- Founder: Annie Walker
- Headquarters: Allen, Texas, United States
- Key people: Doris Pfardrescher (CEO); Dennis Walker (CFO, COO)

Well Go USA Entertainment is an American independent and international film distributor. It distributes films in a variety of genres, including action films, American indie films, and martial arts films, on all types of platforms, including in movie theaters, on DVDs and Blu-rays, and via video on demand (VOD). It is a major distributor of Asian action films in the United States.

Well Go is located in Allen, Texas. Since 2014 and as of February 2025, Doris Pfardrescher and Dennis Walker (daughter and son of founder Annie Walker) were CEO and CFO/COO respectively.

== History ==
Well Go Entertainment is a family-owned business whose origins were in distributing home entertainment content such as karaoke videos in the 1990s. The company was founded by Annie Walker in 1989, after she moved to North Texas from Taiwan with her family. After a stint working for Fendi Timepieces as a regional manager in Dallas, Walker started importing karaoke LaserDiscs from Taiwan. The company was incorporated in 1994, at which time it acquired its current name. The name derives from the logo of the LaserDisc business, a singing dog, which in Chinese is "hui guo". The term sounds something like "way go", which to Walker's ear transliterated in English as "Well Go".

At first the company worked with a Taiwanese distributor, then when that went under, started distributing discs there, before moving into the American market. In the mid-2000s it started focusing on straight-to-video releases, the first being a golf instruction DVD by British golfer David Leadbetter. As DVDs became less popular and VODs more so, along with the growing demand for Asian action movies, Well Go started focusing on films and the VOD market. It bought the sole rights to the distribution of the sequel to Ip Man on VOD, which was a huge hit. Over time it expanded into other genres, including horror and indie films.

== Business model ==
The company acquires the rights to a product, and it sells to other companies. As well as selling the DVD versions of films, it also deals directly with streaming services like Netflix and Hulu as well as platforms like iTunes and YouTube. In 2019, it established its own streaming service called Hi-Yah (stylized as Hi-YAH!).

As of 2019, Well Go released around 18–20 movies theatrically, and a total of around 50–60 films total including VOD and DVD, each year.

The company is a major sponsor of Asian Film Festival of Dallas.

== Films ==
Well Go distributes films in a variety of genres, including action films, American indie films, and martial arts films, on all types of platforms, including in movie theaters, on DVDs and Blu-rays, and via video on demand (VOD).

The company is a major distributor of Asian films, especially Chinese ones, which often play in AMC Theatres before moving to VOD. Its Asian film releases include the martial arts movie Ip Man 3, and the arthouse film, The Assassin, both released in 2015. In the same year, Well Go released the British satirical crime-thriller Kill Your Friends and the Canadian thriller River. Well Go scored a major coup when it acquired the rights to the 2018 Korean hit Burning, which it released on Blu-ray and DVD on March 5, 2019.

In 2019, Well Go USA signed a deal with an indie production company called Rustic Films to distribute their films, including The Endless.

The 2023 Hong Kong–Chinese wuxia film Sakra has its debut release on Blu-ray and DVD on June 13, 2023. Also in 2023, Well Go acquired distribution rights for the Australian sci-fi thriller Monolith, first screened in 2022 at the Adelaide Film Festival.
