= Everybody Dies by the End =

2022 film by Ian Tripp and Ryan Schafer

- Poster
- Directed by: Ian Tripp; Ryan Schafer
- Written by: Ian Tripp
- Produced by: Ryan Schafer; Sam Sprague; Ian Tripp; Joshua Wyble
- Starring: Vinny Curran; Bill Oberst Jr.; Brendan Cahalan; Iliyana Apostolova; Ian Tripp; Joshua Wyble; Ryan Schafer; Caroline Amiguet; Paul Fisher III; Alan Vazquez
- Cinematography: Oscar Perez; Ian Tripp
- Edited by: Ian Tripp; Joshua Wyble
- Production company: Children of Celluloid
- Distributed by: Terror Films
- Release dates: August 29, 2022 (FrightFest); September 22, 2023 (VOD)
- Running time: 90 minutes
- Country: United States
- Language: English

Everybody Dies by the End is a 2022 found footage comedy horror mockumentary film written by Ian Tripp and directed by Tripp and Ryan Schafer in their feature film debut. The film stars Vinny Curran, Bill Oberst Jr., Brendan Cahalan, Iliyana Apostolova, and Ian Tripp.

The film premiered at FrightFest in 2022 and won 3 San Diego Film Awards for performances by Curran, Cahalan, and ensemble. It has an 83% approval rating from 6 critic reviews on Rotten Tomatoes and is one of Vulture Magazine's 15 Horror Movies About Showbiz.

== Plot ==
Alfred Costella is a controversial filmmaker known for films such as Battery Acid and Kill Time: Now. On a talk show called Man of the Hour, Costella becomes angry and lashes out at the interviewer for criticizing his movies.

After a 10-year hiatus, Costella contacts a documentary filmmaker named Calvin about documenting his final film. Calvin and his friend Mark head to Costella's ranch house, "Camp Costella", where his assistant Grant greets them.

Calvin meets with and interviews Alfred about his final movie, Everybody Dies by the End, which he claims is an allegory for the end of his career and calls his "magnum opus". Alfred explains that he took a break from filmmaking following the interview, which left him emotionally devastated and disillusioned with the film industry. After struggling with a lack of inspiration and questioning his identity as a filmmaker, he resolves to make a film so extreme that it will shock the cinematic world.

The cast and crew arrive, and following a table read of the script, Calvin interviews the lead actors, Allison McCree and Theo Bradley, who discuss their reasons for starring in the film. Calvin notices that Alfred is frustrated, and Alfred later speaks to him in his room about his insecurities and worries about the film. Later that night, an unknown person films Calvin while he sleeps.

On the first day of shooting, Alfred criticizes Theo for not getting into character and requests that the scene be cut, but Allison insists on trying again. Later, Alfred praises Allison's acting.

During a scene in which Allison is sprayed with blood, Alfred becomes angry at her lack of commitment and calls cut. During the break, Alfred reveals that the blood came from a slaughtered pig, enraging Allison. She threatens to leave the film but agrees to stay after Alfred apologizes, on the condition that she spray him with the same blood.

That night, Alfred and Allison argue, and Grant becomes hostile toward Calvin when he attempts to follow them. The next day, Grant apologizes, and Allison tells Calvin that she "changed" after Alfred took her to his "red room", but does not elaborate.

On another day of shooting, Alfred becomes increasingly frustrated with Theo, and the two argue. When Alfred discovers that Theo is quitting, he demands that his death scene be filmed that night. On set, Theo cuts his arm with a real knife, believing it to be fake. Alfred claims that Theo has left and shows Calvin a video of a crew member dying in a set accident. He then shows Calvin the red room and the crew member's skull, revealing that Calvin uploaded the video. Alfred gives Calvin a shirt as a gift.

On the final day of shooting, Calvin speaks with Allison about the film, and she tells him that it has given her a purpose in life. During filming, Allison shoots herself for a scene. Calvin becomes concerned and demands to see her, but Grant becomes hostile toward him and Mark, stating that "everybody must die by the end" for the film to be complete. Grant kills Mark by stabbing him before killing himself in front of Calvin. Four crew members then shoot themselves, and Alfred takes Calvin to the set, where he kills another crew member by dropping a studio light on his head. Alfred then kills Calvin by shooting him.

Alfred shaves his beard and addresses the camera about not compromising one's vision before throwing himself into a woodchipper.

FBI workers review the footage. As they leave, two FBI workers discuss Costella's films, and one suggests watching the footage again, much to the other's concern. One of the FBI workers then files the footage away in an evidence room.

== Cast ==
- Vinny Curran as Alfred Costella
- Bill Oberst Jr. as Willy Wilson
- Brendan Cahalan as Grant
- Iliyana Apostolova as Alison
- Ian Tripp as Calvin
- Joshua Wyble as Mark
- Ryan Schafer as Howard
- Caroline Amiguet as Laura
- Paul Fisher III as Cornelius
- Alan Vazquez as Slater

== Production ==
The film is Tripp and Schafer's feature film debut. Principal photography took place during the COVID-19 pandemic in a basement in San Diego known as Gray Area Multimedia, at a mountain ranch in Jamul and Tripp's home in San Carlos.

== Release ==
The film premiered August 29, 2022, at FrightFest. It screened at Dublin Horrorthon Film Festival, Molins Horror Film Festival, Feratum Film Festival and Unnamed Footage Festival. It was distributed by Terror Films on September 22, 2023.

== Reception ==
=== Critical response ===
On the review aggregator website Rotten Tomatoes, 83% of 6 critics' reviews are positive, with an average rating of 6.0/10.

Martin Unsworth at Starburst Magazine scored it 3 out of 5. Rory Doherty at Vulture Magazine listed the film as one of 15 Horror Movies About Showbiz.

Accolades
Festival	Year	Award	Recipient(s)	Result	Ref.
San Diego Film Awards	2023	Best Lead Actor	Vinny Curran	Won	
San Diego Film Awards	2023	Best Supporting Actor	Brendan Cahalan	Won	
San Diego Film Awards	2023	Best Ensemble Cast	Various	Won	
San Diego Film Awards	2023	Best Narrative Feature Film	Ian Tripp, Ryan Schafer	Nominated	

== See also ==
- List of films featuring fictional films
- One Cut of the Dead
