= House of Darkness (2022 film) =

- Film poster
- Directed by: Neil LaBute
- Written by: Neil LaBute
- Produced by: Daryl Freimark; Tim Harms; Neil LaBute; Shaun Sanghani
- Starring: Justin Long; Kate Bosworth; Gia Crovatin; Lucy Walters
- Cinematography: Daniel Katz
- Edited by: Bridget Durnford
- Music by: Adam Bosarge
- Production company: SSS Entertainment
- Distributed by: Saban Films
- Release dates: March 8, 2022 (Santa Barbara International Film Festival); September 9, 2022 (U.S.)
- Running time: 88 minutes
- Country: United States
- Language: English

House of Darkness is a 2022 American Gothic film directed by Neil LaBute, starring Justin Long, Kate Bosworth, Gia Crovatin and Lucy Walters. The film is a reimagining of Dracula.

== Plot ==
After meeting at a bar, Hapgood "Hap" Jackson goes back to Mina Murray's remote, castle-like estate. While Mina is out of the room fixing drinks, Hap calls a male friend to brag about his hookup. Following an evening of drinking, flirting, and kissing, Mina begins unbuckling Hap's pants. Mina's sister Lucy unexpectedly interrupts. Hap gets the idea that he might have a threesome with both women. Mina exits the room to get more drinks. Hap and Lucy have a private conversation.

Hap briefly falls asleep. Hap has a nightmare where he is imprisoned in a cave with a pile of shoes indicating he is another in a long line of victims. After he wakes, Lucy takes Hap on a tour of the manor. Mina eventually rejoins them and they return to the sitting room. Lucy and Mina propose exchanging ghost stories. Hap adlibs a glib story about a man who has a threesome with two sisters.

Lucy responds by telling a tale of wronged women who sought vengeance on men who raped them and who continue pursuing sexual predators across the world. Hap becomes further disturbed when Lucy mentions a cave like the one he saw in his nightmare. A third sister, Nora, enters the room. Realizing that the women intend to teach him a morality lesson, Hap becomes combative and tries to leave. Revealing themselves as vampires, Mina, Lucy and Nora unravel their supernatural powers with their fangs to destroy and devour Hap.

== Cast ==
- Justin Long as Hapgood "Hap" Jackson
- Kate Bosworth as Mina Murray
- Gia Crovatin as Lucy
- Lucy Walters as Nora

== Release ==
The film premiered at the Santa Barbara International Film Festival on March 8, 2022. The film had its international premiere at the Fantasia International Film Festival on July 22. The film premiered in select theatres on September 9, and was released on Video on Demand and digital on September 13.

== Reception ==
The review aggregator website Rotten Tomatoes reported an approval rating of 59%, with an average rating of 5.80/10, based on 61 reviews. The site's critics consensus reads: "House of Darkness finds writer-director Neil LaBute just as acerbic as ever, although he's made more compelling statements on sexual mores." On Metacritic, the film has a weighted average score of 54 out of 100, based on 12 critics, indicating "mixed or average reviews".

Josh Korngut of Dread Central rated the film 3.5 stars out of 5, writing that it "manages to make a home of its own within a well-worn horror subgenre with originality, tension, and charm." Joe Lipsett of Bloody Disgusting rated the film a four out of five, writing: "The interplay of these two main performances – both sexually and linguistically – ensures that House of Darkness is never boring."

Peter DeBruge of Variety wrote a positive review of the film, writing that it "neatly comments on the newly uncertain dynamics of modern dating, where 'decent guys' claim to no longer know how to proceed". Nikki Baughan of Screen Daily wrote a positive review of the film, writing that "it’s always welcome to see filmmakers presenting a challenge to the patriarchal status quo, even if toxic femininity proves just as damning here as its masculine counterpart."
