= Ian Tripp =

American filmmaker

- Born: Ian Francis Tripp; San Diego, California, U.S.
- Occupations: Film director; screenwriter; film producer; film editor; actor
- Years active: 2014–present
- Known for: Children of Celluloid
- Notable work: Everybody Dies by the End; Sincerely Saul

Ian Francis Tripp is an American filmmaker and actor who wrote and co-directed the found footage film Everybody Dies by the End (2022) and wrote and directed the black and white film Sincerely Saul (2024).

== Personal life ==
Tripp grew up in San Diego, California. He became interested in directing when he was eight years old, and started making films when he was a teenager.

== Career ==
Tripp directed Ryan Schafer in a 2015 short film called Philip Finds Love. He often works with Schafer, along with actors Vinny Curran and Caroline Amiguet on his films. In 2024, Tripp acted in and co-produced the film Daydreamer by Sam Sprague.

=== Released films ===
Tripp co-directed his debut film Everybody Dies by the End with Schafer. It premiered at FrightFest in 2022, and was listed on Vulture's 15 Horror Movies About Showbiz and Rotten Tomatoes' 100 Best Found Footage Movies. Ginger Nuts of Horror wrote it was "a great job on a limited budget." The Hollywood News, Horror Press, and Morbidly Beautiful praised the film, but Video Librarian did not recommend it, criticizing its filmmaking topic.

His next film Sincerely Saul starred Schafer, and included numerous actors from the former. Film critic Daniel M. Kimmel compared it to seeing Eraserhead by David Lynch when it first released and wrote "don’t discount the possibility that writer/director Ian Tripp just might have more ambitious works in his future." HorrorBuzz wrote "Tripp has a knack for earning laughs out of otherwise serious subject matter." The New York Times wrote it is a "gloriously demented low-fi horror comedy" and Variety listed it on their Best Horror of October 2025.

Both films were produced under Tripp's production company Children of Celluloid.

== Filmography ==
Feature films
Year	Title	Role	Producer	Writer	Director	Editor	Notes
2022	Everybody Dies by the End	Calvin	Yes	Yes	Co-director	Co-editor	also co-cinematographer
2024	Sincerely Saul	—N/a	Yes	Yes	Yes	Yes	
2024	Daydreamer	Jason Sandoval	Co-producer	No	No	No	
TBA	Normy †	—N/a	Yes	Yes	Yes	Yes	
TBA	Manny Moondog †	—N/a	Yes	Yes	Yes	Yes	

Key
†	Denotes films that have not yet been released

Short films
Year	Title	Role	Producer	Writer	Director	Notes
2015	Philip Finds Love	—N/a	Executive	Yes	Yes	also cinematographer and editor
2017	Bag-Head	—N/a	Co-producer	Yes	Yes	also editor
2017	180: Clone Test	Clone 1 / Clone 2	Yes	No	No	
2017	Imperial Iliad	Alec	Yes	No	No	
2018	Inanimate Objects Don't Talk Back	—N/a	Yes	Yes	Yes	also editor
2019	Buggard	—N/a	Yes	No	No	
2022	Clown Time	Markus Scorson	Associate producer	No	No	
2022	EGODEATH	Johnny Butts	Associate producer	No	No	
