= Blur Circle =

- Directed by: Christopher J. Hansen
- Written by: Brian Elliott
- Produced by: Brian Elliott; Christopher J. Hansen
- Starring: Cora Vander Broek; Matthew Brumlow
- Cinematography: Aaron Youngblood
- Edited by: Jay Gammill
- Production company: Theoretical Entertainment
- Distributed by: Indie Rights
- Release dates: 20 October 2016 (Dallas VideoFest); 12 January 2018 (US)
- Running time: 92 minutes
- Country: United States
- Language: English

Blur Circle is a 2016 American drama film directed by Christopher J. Hansen, starring Cora Vander Broek and Matthew Brumlow.

== Cast ==
- Cora Vander Broek as Jill Temple
- Matthew Brumlow as Burton Rose
- Ryan Artzberger as Earl Ambrose
- Jency Allison Weeks as Evvy Rose
- Elizabeth A. Davis as Heather
- Jordan Richard as Heather's Husband
- Robert Hagins as Henry
- Ava Hansen as Katie
- Clinton Pickens as Ned
- Toby Meuli as Mark Faxon
- Sam Henderson as Detective Samuels

== Release ==
The film was released on 12 January 2018.

== Reception ==
Frank Scheck of The Hollywood Reporter wrote that while film occasionally feels "overly manipulative", it "proves very moving at times", the storyline "refreshingly avoids going in predictable directions", the characterisations "become subtler and more nuanced", and the performances of Vander Broek, Brumlow and Artzberger are "first-rate".

Kimber Myers of the Los Angeles Times wrote that while the film has "good intentions", it "can’t compensate for characters that are often unlikable and unbelievable."
