= HIPZEE =

American entertainment production company

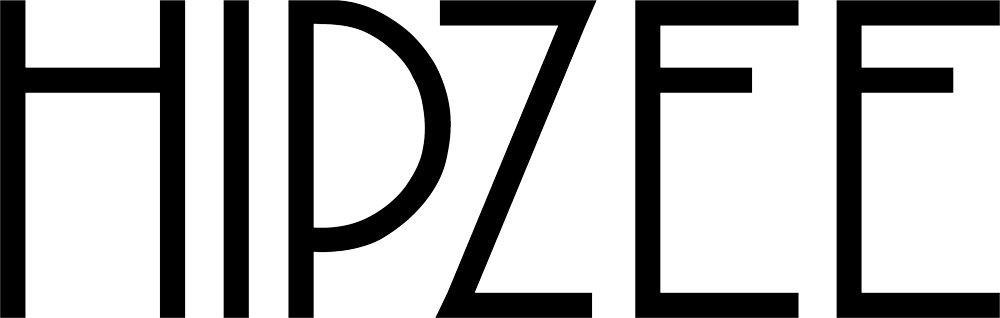
- Industry: Entertainment
- Founded: 2013
- Founders: Tara Sickmeier; Rob Baunoch III
- Website: hipzee.com

HIPZEE is an American entertainment production company co-founded by husband-and-wife team Rob Baunoch III and Tara Sickmeier. The company was formed in Brooklyn, NY in 2013 and is currently based in Los Angeles, CA. HIPZEE produces theatre and on-screen content that targets adult audiences.

== Background ==
After a period of working in the theatre and film industry, Rob Baunoch III and Tara Sickmeier transitioned to executive roles, establishing their own production company, HIPZEE, in 2013.

During the company's initial few years, in addition to production, HIPZEE provided services such as marketing research, consulting, and financing. More recently, it is shifting to a focus on production.

HIPZEE's projects have included the Off-Broadway show HEATHERS: The Musical which was nominated for 'Best New Musical' by the Off-Broadway Alliance in 2014; the 2017 Tony-Award-winning musical Natasha, Pierre, & The Great Comet of 1812; and the company's first feature film Above the Shadows, which stars Olivia Thirlby, Alan Ritchson, Jim Gaffigan, and Megan Fox.

== Production history ==
=== Stage ===
Following its success in producing the Off-Broadway show, HEATHERS: The Musical, HIPZEE received a Tony Award nomination for its work on the Broadway musical Natasha, Pierre, and The Great Comet of 1812.

Title	Creator(s)	Year(s) Active
HEATHERS: The Musical	Laurence O’Keefe, Kevin Murphy	2014 (Off-Broadway)
Natasha, Pierre, & The Great Comet of 1812	Rachel Chavkin, Dave Malloy	2016-2017 (Broadway)

=== Screen ===
HIPZEE's first feature film (Above the Shadows) was released in select theaters and VOD on July 19, 2019. Above the Shadows’ World Premiere was on May 31, 2019 as the opening night film of the 22nd Brooklyn Film Festival. It won the Audience Choice Award for Best Narrative Feature at BFF. HIPZEE most recently represented the film Feral as its sales company.

Title	Director	Released	Distributor
Above the Shadows	Claudia Myers	July 19, 2019	Gravitas Ventures (US)
Feral	Andrew Wonder	June 2, 2020	1091 Media (US)
