= Matt Chessé =

American film producer

- Born: October 27, 1965 (age 60); San Francisco, California, U.S.
- Occupation: Film editor
- Years active: 1992–present
- Spouse: Gillian Harwood Chesse
- Children: Clover Chessé and Coco Chessé

Matthew Chessé (born October 27, 1965) is an American film editor, producer, and director who is mainly associated with Independent films. He was nominated for the Academy Award for Best Film Editing for Finding Neverland (2004). Chessé has edited most of the films directed by Marc Forster.

== Early life ==
Chessé was born and raised in the San Francisco Bay area, and received a bachelor's degree in English literature from San Francisco State University. He attended Ygnacio Valley High School in the SF/EastBay city of Concord graduating with the Class of 1984.

== Career ==
After college he was invited to relocate to Los Angeles to assist Peter Kagan, a director of commercials, at Stiefel and Co.. He next worked as an assistant to Angus Wall, an editor at the commercial editorial shop Rock, Paper, Scissors. Chessé became an editor under the tutelage of David Lee and Lauren Zuckerman. His first project with Marc Forster was on the film Everything Put Together (2000), which led to their collaboration on the very successful film Monster's Ball (2001).

== Awards ==
Chessé has been elected to membership in the American Cinema Editors.

He has been nominated, for an Oscar in 2005: Best Achievement in Editing for Finding Neverland (2004), an Eddie in 2005: Best Edited Feature Film – Dramatic for Finding Neverland (2004), and a Satellite Award in 2008: Best Film Editing for Quantum of Solace (2008) which he shared with Richard Pearson)

== Personal life ==
Chessé currently lives in Los Angeles, California with his wife, two children, Clover and Coco, and one dog named Shortbread.

== Editing credits ==
Matthew Chessé began his career as an editor. His editing credits include:

Editor
Year	Film	Director	Notes
2000	Everything Put Together	Marc Forster	First collaboration with Marc Forster
2001	Monster's Ball	Marc Forster	Second collaboration with Marc Forster
2004	Finding Neverland	Marc Forster	Third collaboration with Marc Forster
2005	Ellie Parker	Scott Coffey	
2005	Stay	Marc Forster	Fourth collaboration with Marc Forster
2006	Stranger than Fiction	Marc Forster	Fifth collaboration with Marc Forster
2007	The Kite Runner	Marc Forster	Sixth collaboration with Marc Forster
2008	Quantum of Solace	Marc Forster	Seventh collaboration with Marc Forster
2011	Warrior	Gavin O'Connor	
2011	Machine Gun Preacher	Marc Forster	Eighth collaboration with Marc Forster
2013	World War Z	Marc Forster	Ninth collaboration with Marc Forster
2014	Fort Bliss	Claudia Myers	
2014	The Best of Me	Michael Hoffman	
2016	Money Monster	Jodie Foster	
2018	Paris Song	Jeff Vespa	
2018	Christopher Robin	Marc Forster	Tenth collaboration with Marc Forster
2021	Music	Sia	
2021	Sweet Girl	Brian Andrew Mendoza	
2022	A Man Called Otto	Marc Forster	Eleventh collaboration with Marc Forster
2024	White Bird	Marc Forster	Twelfth collaboration with Marc Forster
2026	DreamQuil	Alex Prager	
TBA	Anxious People	Marc Forster	Thirteenth collaboration with Marc Forster

Editorial department
Year	Film	Director	Role
1998	Bongwater	Richard Sears	Assistant editor
2015	The Gift	Joel Edgerton	Additional editor

Producer
Year	Film	Director	Credit
2005	Ellie Parker	Scott Coffey	Co-producer
2014	Fort Bliss	Claudia Myers	Executive producer

Production manager
Year	Film	Director	Role
1998	Bongwater	Richard Sears	Post-production supervisor
2000	Everything Put Together	Marc Forster	Post-production supervisor

Second unit director or assistant director
Year	Film	Director	Role
1997	Loved	Erin Dignam	Second second assistant director

Thanks
Year	Film	Director	Role
2007	Harvest Moon	Brent Nowak	Thanks
2011	Inseparable	Dayyan Eng	Special thanks
2018	Stuck	Jillian Armenante	Very special thanks
2024	Y2K	Kyle Mooney	Special thanks

TV series

Editor
Year	Title	Notes
2014	Tyrant	1 episode
2024	True Detective	2 episodes

Editorial department
Year	Title	Role	Notes
2024	True Detective	Editor	1 episode

Additional crew
Year	Title	Role	Notes
2016	No Sleep TV3	Production assistant	1 episode
