= François Arnaud (actor) =

Canadian actor (born 1985)

- Arnaud in 2026
- Born: François Landriault-Barbeau; July 5, 1985 (age 41); Montreal, Quebec, Canada
- Occupation: Actor
- Years active: 2007–present

François Landriault-Barbeau (born July 5, 1985), known professionally as François Arnaud (French pronunciation: [fʁɑ̃swa aʁno]), is a Canadian actor. His accolades include a Vancouver Film Critics Circle Award, in addition to nominations for two Canadian Screen Awards.

Arnaud's film career began with a role in Xavier Dolan's award-winning I Killed My Mother (2009). He has since appeared in films such as Jean of the Joneses (2016), Origami (2017), Marlowe (2022), Twinless (2025), and Fucktoys (2025). His first television role was on the French Canadian comedy series Taxi 0-22 in 2008, after which Arnaud starred as Cesare Borgia in the Showtime period drama series The Borgias (2011–2013) and Manfred Bernardo in the NBC supernatural drama series Midnight, Texas (2017–2018). He gained wider recognition for portraying Scott Hunter in the Crave sports romance series Heated Rivalry (2025–present).

== Early life and education ==
Arnaud was born on July 5, 1985, in Montreal, Quebec, Canada. He is French Canadian. He has a younger sister, a lawyer. The first play he saw was Cyrano de Bergerac at age nine; inspired by the performance, he went home and tried to learn the monologues. Arnaud graduated from Collège Jean-de-Brébeuf with an arts degree. He later trained at the Conservatoire d'art dramatique de Montréal.

== Career ==
Arnaud started his career in Quebec by landing a role in French Canadian comedy series Taxi 0-22 in 2008. The following year, he starred as Antonin Rimbaud in the Xavier Dolan's award-winning film I Killed My Mother (J'ai tué ma mère), an Oedipal coming-of-age drama that premiered in the Director's Fortnight section of the 2009 Cannes Film Festival. Arnaud received a VFCC Award for Best Supporting Actor in a Canadian Film for his work in I Killed My Mother, and credits this with getting him an agent in Hollywood who helped him get auditions for larger roles.

Arnaud became known for his performance as Cesare Borgia in the Showtime series The Borgias. He portrayed Oscar in the NBC drama series Blindspot. He also starred in Midnight, Texas portraying the troubled psychic Manfred Bernardo from 2017 to 2018. The show filmed in Albuquerque and Arnaud enjoyed exploring the mountains and waterfalls nearby during his five months there.

In 2016, Arnaud filmed Permission in New York City. Later, Arnaud filmed sci-fi thriller Origami, a French-Canadian movie that was shot in his home town of Montreal. The film was so physically and psychologically exhausting for Arnaud that he could not work for a month afterwards so he retreated to a cabin in the woods. In 2017, Arnaud filmed the indie film, She's in Portland with Tommy Dewey, which was released in 2020.

Arnaud featured in an episode of Schitt's Creek as Sebastien Raine, David's ex-boyfriend and photographer. In 2019, the film Rapid Eye Movement was released which saw Arnaud playing a radio DJ. Arnaud shot this in Times Square in a glass booth where he interacted with passersby. Also in 2019, Arnaud started shooting a psychological thriller called Mom. He plays opposite Emily Hampshire, whom he met while working on Schitt's Creek. He was cast because Emily would only accept her role if Arnaud played her husband. Arnaud portrayed Dan Moody in The Moodys over two seasons until its cancellation in 2021.

In 2024, Arnaud starred in the music video for "How Far Will We Take It?" by Orville Peck and Noah Cyrus.

In 2025, Arnaud starred as ice hockey player Scott Hunter in the Canadian sports romance series Heated Rivalry. His performance was met with critical praise, particularly his work in the season's third episode, "Hunter". The series is based on Canadian writer Rachel Reid's Game Changers book series. That year, Arnaud also appeared in Annapurna Sriram's Fucktoys, which premiered at South by Southwest; James Sweeney's Twinless, which premiered at Sundance; and Wiebke von Carolsfeld's forthcoming drama film Someone's Daughter.

In June 2026, Arnaud was cast in the upcoming Hulu limited series Count My Lies in a recurring role as Danny, appearing opposite Lindsay Lohan. The same month, it was announced that Arnaud had joined David Corenswet and Yvonne Strahovski in the Broadway revival of Three Days of Rain, portraying Pip and Theo.

In July 2026 he was named global brand ambassador of American sportswear company Under Armour.

== Personal life ==
Arnaud dated actress Evelyne Brochu from 2012 to 2014. He came out as bisexual in September 2020. In May 2023, he announced that he and actor Marc Bendavid had been dating for a year.

Arnaud is fluent in French and English. He learned Spanish in high school and later traveled to Latin America, where a Chilean girlfriend helped improve his proficiency in the language. However, he did not use Spanish for a decade before his role in Amapola, which was set in Argentina.

== Acting credits ==
=== Film ===
Key
†	Denotes films that have not yet been released

Year	Title	Role	Notes	Ref.
2009	I Killed My Mother	Antonin Rimbaud		
2009	Heat Wave	Yannick Ménard		
2013	Copperhead	Warner Pitts		
2013	Moroccan Gigolos	Nicholas		
2014	Amapola	Luke		
2014	Big Sky	Clete		
2015	Caesar	Mark Antony		
2015	The Girl King	Karl Gustav Kasimir		
2015	Rabid Dogs	Vincent		
2016	The Man Who Was Thursday	Gabriel Syme		
2016	Jean of the Joneses	Jeremiah Rosen		
2016	The People Garden	Jamie		
2017	Permission	Dane		
2017	Origami	David		
2018	Rapid Eye Movement	Rick Weider		
2020	She's in Portland	Luke		
2020	Paint	Conner Fontaine		
2020	Esther's Choice	Michael	Short film	
2021	Goodbye Happiness	Nicolas		
2021	The Winter House	Jesse		
2022	Norbourg	Vincent Lacroix		
2022	Marlowe	Nico Peterson		
2022	The Switch	Leblanc		
2022	Two Days Before Christmas	Alex		
2024	Mom	Jared		
2024	Canadian, Sniper	Sniper		
2025	Twinless	Sammy		
2025	In Transit	Tom		
2025	Fucktoys	The Mechanic		
2025	The Letter	Demian		
2026	Abril	Gabriel		
2026	Someone's Daughter	Paul		
TBA	Godstar †	Sky Blue		
TBA	Old Friends New Friends †	TBA		

=== Television ===
Key
†	Denotes television productions that have not yet been released

Year	Title	Role	Notes	Ref.
2007	C.A.	Serveur resto Maude	Episode: "Réseau rencontre"	
2008	Taxi 0-22	Marc-André	5 episodes	
2008	The Double Life of Eleanor Kendall	Stefan	Television film	
2009–2010	Yamaska	Théo Carpentier	27 episodes	
2011–2013	The Borgias	Cesare Borgia	29 episodes	
2014	Apocalypse: World War I	Narrator	5 episodes	
2015–2016	X Company	Rene Villiers	4 episodes	
2015–2016, 2020	Blindspot	Oscar	18 episodes	
2017	Schitt's Creek	Sebastien Raine	Episode: "Sebastien Raine"	
2017	High School Lover	Christian Booth	Television film	
2017–2018	Midnight, Texas	Manfred Bernardo	19 episodes	
2018	UnREAL	Tommy Castelli	8 episodes	
2019–2021	The Moodys	Dan Moody	14 episodes	
2022	Surface	Harrison	8 episodes	
2023	Plan B	Patrick Landry	6 episodes	
2023	Yellowjackets	Paul	4 episodes	
2023	Quantum Leap	Curtis Bailey	Episode: "This Took Too Long!"	
2025	Mr. Big	Jean-François "Jeff" Sauvageau	10 episodes	
2025–present	Heated Rivalry	Scott Hunter	5 episodes	
2026	Alice †	Mitchell		
2027	Count My Lies †	Danny Shepherd	Recurring role	

=== Theatre ===
Key

†	Denotes theatre productions that have not yet premiered

Year	Title	Role	Venue	Ref.
2008	Réveillez-vous et chantez	Ralph	Théâtre de l'Opsis	
2008	L'impressario de Smyrne		Théâtre Prospero	
2009	L'oeil du lynx	Le garçon	Théâtre du Nouveau Monde	
2025	Une fête d'enfants	David	Théâtre du Nouveau Monde	
2027	Three Days of Rain †	Pip/Theo	Longacre Theatre	

== Awards and nominations ==
List of awards and nominations for François Arnaud
Year	Award	Category	Work	Result	Ref.
2010	Vancouver Film Critics Circle	Best Supporting Actor in a Canadian Film	I Killed My Mother	Won	
2010	Prix Gémeaux	Best Lead Actor in a Television Drama	Yamaska	Nominated	
2014	Canadian Screen Awards	Best Actor in a Continuing Leading Dramatic Role	The Borgias	Nominated	
2022	Alpe d'Huez International Comedy Film Festival	Best Actor (shared with Antoine Bertrand, Louis Morissette and Patrice Robitaille)	Goodbye Happiness	Won	
2024	Northern Ontario Music and Film Awards	Outstanding Performance by an Actor	The Switch	Nominated	
2024	Vienna Independent Film Festival	Best Actor	Canadian, Sniper	Won	
2026	Queerty Awards	Best TV Performance	Heated Rivalry	Won	
2026	Canadian Screen Awards	Best Leading Performance in a Drama Series	Heated Rivalry	Nominated	
2026	ACTRA Award	Members' Choice Series Ensemble	Heated Rivalry	Won	
2026	ACTRA Award in Montreal	Outstanding Performance in TV	Heated Rivalry	Won	
2026	Dorian Awards	Best Supporting TV Performance – Drama	Heated Rivalry	Won	
2026	Gold Derby TV Awards	Drama Supporting Actor	Heated Rivalry	Nominated	
2026	Gold Derby TV Awards	Ensemble of the Year	Heated Rivalry	Won	
