= Annapurna Sriram =

American Filmmaker

- Occupations: Actor, filmmaker, writer
- Notable work: Fucktoys

Annapurna Sriram is an American film director, screenwriter, and actor from Nashville, Tennessee. She is known as the writer-director and star of the 2025 film Fucktoys, which premiered at South by Southwest where it won the Special Jury Award for a Multi-Hyphenate and received positive reviews from critics. Sriram's performance in the 2019 film Feral received positive reviews from The New York Times, The Hollywood Reporter, and Variety.

== Early life and education ==
Sriram was raised in Nashville, Tennessee, where she attended a performing arts high school. In her youth, she enjoyed borrowing cult films from the library (including John Waters' Polyester), was a self-described "theater kid", and a champion Irish dancer.

While attending Rutgers' Mason Gross School of the Arts, she studied at the Globe Theater in London for a year, earning an acting BFA in 2011.

== Career ==
Sriram began her career in the film industry as an actor, appearing in shorts, feature films, and series. Her first lead role in a feature film was in the 2019 drama thriller Feral, directed by Andrew Wonder. Glenn Kenny of The New York Times praised her "bravura, multilayered lead performance" and John DeFore from The Hollywood Reporter described the role as a "complicated protagonist, played brilliantly." For her performance as Yazmine, she won the Outstanding Performance Award at the Bushwick Film Festival. Sriram has appeared in a number of popular television series including Billions, The Blacklist, and I Think You Should Leave with Tim Robinson.

Sriram has experience in live theater; her notable stage credits include originating the role of Reshma in Jesse Eisenberg's play The Spoils, directed by Scott Elliott for The New Group in 2015. She later reprised the role on the West End in London at Trafalgar Studios in 2016. Variety called Sriram "perfect in this role." She also appeared in Wallace Shawn's Evening at the Talk House alongside Matthew Broderick and in Quiara Alegría Hudes' The Happiest Song Plays Last.

Sriram's experiences as a biracial actor in Hollywood influenced her decision to create her own work. She has stated that as an "ethnically ambiguous" actor, she was frequently typecast into racial stereotypes and limiting roles which did not align with her creative ambitions. This led her to write material for herself.

In 2025, Sriram made her feature directorial debut with Fucktoys, which she wrote, directed, starred in, and executive produced. The film took eight years to create. The film was inspired by a breakup in Sriram's late 20s that occurred after a psychic told her she needed to end the relationship or face negative consequences for her career and health. Fucktoys premiered at South by Southwest on March 9, 2025, where it won the Special Jury Award for a Multi-Hyphenate. The film was shot on 16mm film and has been described as drawing inspiration from the works of John Waters, Gregg Araki, Jim Jarmusch, and Ken Russell. Sriram has described the film as "neo-camp" and "American New Wave revival", exploring themes of capitalism, class, and structures of oppression through a distinctly female perspective.

== Acting credits ==
=== Film ===
Year	Title	Role	Notes
2004	Dip, Snip and Zip	Annabelle	Short, credited as Anna Sriram
2005	The Tulip Grower	Anna	Short, credited as Anna Sriram
2009	Blood Over Broadway	Charlene Little	Short, credited as Anna Sriram
2016	The Lost Flowers	Paula	Short
2016	The Real Award	Jennifer	Short
2016	Why I Eat Bread	Molecular Water Healer	
2016	America Adrift	Abby	
2017	Girl Friends	Cooper	Short
2017	In Case of Emergency	Jasmine	
2018	Carnivore	Ahana	Short
2019	Dom	Dom	Short
2019	Secret Men's Business	Hayley	Short
2019	Feral	Yazmine	
2019	Terzetto	Ruby	Short
2020	Doppelbänger	Cecilia	Short
2020	Give or Take	Lauren	
2020	A Case of Blue	Amelia	
2021	The Lovers	Andy	Short
2021	Welcome to God's Country	Taylor	Short
2021	Work Wife		TV Movie
2022	Measure of Revenge	Zoe / Hamlette	
2022	Continue	Taryn	
2022	Mid-Century	Ofc. Raquel Dorado	
2022	Rabbit!		Short
2022	Tenderly	Aubrey	Short
2024	The French Italian	Kelsey	
2024	Positive Reinforcement	Daisy	Short
2025	Fucktoys	AP	
TBA	Still Hungry?		

=== Television ===
Year	Title	Role	Notes
2012	Jest Originals	Office Worker / Orgy Participant	1 episode
2015	South of Hell	Diversi-Tay	5 episodes
2016	Billions	Tara Mohr	3 episodes
2016	Billy & Billie	Terri	1 episode
2016	The Path	Meera	3 episodes
2016	The Blacklist	Odette	5 episodes
2017	Modern Aliens: A Documentary Periodical	Sarah Sprolo	2 episodes
2020	Coup	Lena Remnick	Mini series
2021	Bonding	Kassandra	4 episodes
2021	I Think You Should Leave with Tim Robinson	Joanie	1 episode

== Filmmaking credits ==
Year	Title	Position
2016	The Lost Flowers	Writer
2017	Girl Friends	Associate producer
2022	Tenderly	Associate producer
2023	Goldilocks	Executive producer
2025	Fucktoys	Writer, director, executive producer, actor

== Awards and nominations ==
=== Awards ===
- Special Jury Award for a Multi-Hyphenate at SXSW 2025 for Fucktoys
- Special Jury Mention for a Narrative Feature at OCFF 2025 for Fucktoys
- Audience Choice Award for Best Debut Feature at BUFF 2025 for Fucktoys
- Grand Jury Prize for New Directors Competition at NashFilm 2025 for Fucktoys
- Grand Jury Prize at San Diego Asian Film Festival 2025 for Fucktoys
- Jury Award for Best Ensemble at Out on Film 2020 for Give or Take
- Best Actor/Outstanding Performance Award at BFF 2019 for Feral
- Special Achievement Award for Acting in a Fiction Feature at Red Rock Film Festival 2019 for Feral

=== Nominations ===
- Second Runner Up for the Golden Space Needle Award for Best Director at SIFF 2025 for Fucktoys
- Grand Jury Award for a Narrative Feature at SXSW 2025 for Fucktoys
- Grand Jury Prize for Best Narrative Feature at OCFF 2025 for Fucktoys
- Prize of the City of Torino for Best Feature Film at TFF 2025 for Fucktoys
- New American Cinema Competition at SIFF 2025 for Fucktoys
- American Independent Award for Best Feature Film at Denver Film 2025 for Fucktoys
- New Visions Award for Best Motion Picture at Sitges 2025 for Fucktoys
- June Award for Best Acting Ensemble at Indie Short Fest 2020 for Coup

== See also ==
- List of female film and television directors
