= Oakes Fegley =

American actor

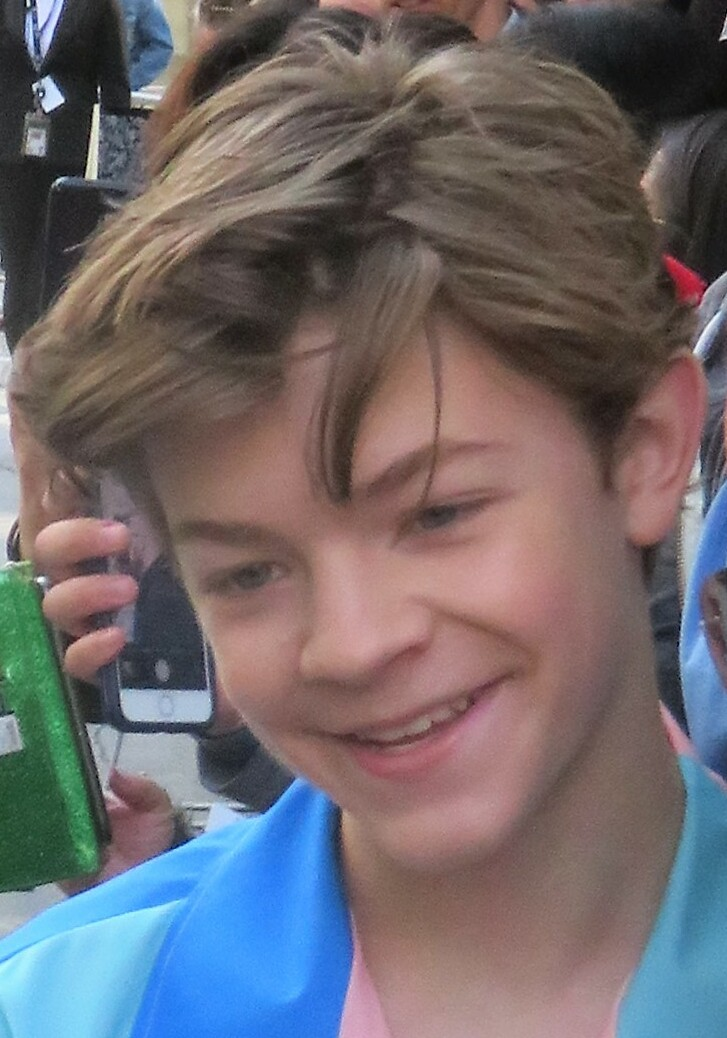
- Fegley in September 2019
- Born: Oakes Tonne Fegley; November 11, 2004 (age 21); Allentown, Pennsylvania, U.S.
- Occupation: Actor
- Years active: 2011–present
- Notable work: Pete's Dragon (2016 film); Person of Interest (2011 TV series); The Goldfinch (2019 film); The Fabelmans (2022 film); Dark Matter (2024 TV series)
- Relatives: Winslow Fegley (brother)

Oakes Tonne Fegley (/oʊks ˈfɛˌɡliː/; born November 11, 2004) is an American actor. He has starred in Pete's Dragon (2016), Wonderstruck (2017), The Goldfinch (2019), The War with Grandpa (2020), The Fabelmans (2022), Adam the First (2024), and Dark Matter (2024).

== Early life and education ==
Fegley was born November 11, 2004, in Allentown, Pennsylvania, the son of actors Michael Fegley and Mercedes "Merce" (née Tonne). He is the older brother of actor Winslow Fegley.

== Career ==
In 2014, Fegley made his acting debut in the drama film Fort Bliss, along with Michelle Monaghan and Ron Livingston, in which he played Paul Swann. The film, which premiered in 2014, was directed by Claudia Myers. He played the young Judd Altman in the comedy-drama film This Is Where I Leave You, directed by Shawn Levy and released in September 2014 by Warner Bros. Pictures. He later appeared as Young Elias "Eli" Thompson in the fifth season of the HBO series Boardwalk Empire. He also has appeared in CBS' Person of Interest as Gabriel Hayward.

Fegley played the lead role of Pete in Walt Disney Pictures' fantasy comedy-drama film Pete's Dragon (a reimagining of Disney's 1977 film), opposite Oona Laurence, Bryce Dallas Howard, and Robert Redford. The film was directed by David Lowery and released in August 2016.

In 2019, he played the starring role of Theodore Decker in The Goldfinch, directed by John Crowley.

Fegley appeared in The Weinstein Company's comedy film The War with Grandpa, starring Robert De Niro, released in August 2020.

In January 2021, Fegley entered early negotiations to play the role of Lampwick in Disney's live-action adaptation of Pinocchio. Lewin Lloyd was eventually cast in the role. The film was directed by Robert Zemeckis and released in September 2022.

In 2022, he played Chad Thomas in Steven Spielberg's semi-autobiographical film The Fabelmans, the character being based on a student who levied anti-Semitic abuse towards Spielberg during his high school years in real life.

== Filmography ==
=== Film ===
Year	Title	Role	Notes
2011	Glass	Boy	Short film
2013	Children of the Moon	Michael	Short film, alongside his father
2014	Fort Bliss	Paul Swann	
2014	This Is Where I Leave You	Young Judd Altman	
2015	Prism	Young Bryan	
2016	Pete's Dragon	Pete	
2017	Wonderstruck	Ben	
2017	The Truth About Lies	Boy	
2019	The Goldfinch	Young Theo Decker	
2020	The War with Grandpa	Peter Decker	
2022	The Fabelmans	Chad Thomas	
2024	Adam the First	Adam	
TBA	When the Moon Was Twice as Big	Jeffrey	Post-production
TBA	Who Framed Tommy Callahan	Tommy Callahan	Post-production

=== Television ===
Year	Title	Role	Notes
2014	Boardwalk Empire	Young Elias "Eli" Thompson	3 episodes
2014–16	Person of Interest	Gabriel Hayward	3 episodes
2023	Accused	Devin Harmon	Episode: 'Scott's Story'
2024–present	Dark Matter	Charlie Dessen	Main role

== Awards and nominations ==
Year	Nomination Work	Category	Result
2017	Pete's Dragon	38th Young Artist Awards Best performance in a Feature Film - leading Young Actor	Nominated
2018	Wonderstruck	39th Young Artist Awards Best performance in a Feature Film -leading Young Actor	Nominated
