= Feral (2019 film) =

- Film poster
- Directed by: Andrew Wonder
- Written by: Andrew Wonder, Priscilla Kavanaugh, Jason Mendez
- Produced by: Alon Simcha, Andrew Wonder
- Starring: Annapurna Sriram
- Cinematography: Andrew Wonder
- Edited by: Jason Sager
- Production companies: Tomorrow; HIPZEE
- Distributed by: 1091 Media
- Release dates: April 7, 2019 (Sarasota Film Festival); June 2, 2020 (United States)
- Running time: 74 minutes
- Country: United States
- Language: English

Feral is a 2019 drama thriller film written and directed by Andrew Wonder. The film stars Annapurna Sriram. It is based on actual stories of living underground and working with former homeless individuals.

Feral had its world premiere at the Sarasota Film Festival on April 7, 2019, and its international premiere on October 17, 2019, at the Festival Du Nouveau Cinéma in Montreal. It was released to video-on-demand and digital platforms on June 2, 2020.

== Synopsis ==
Feral tells the story of Yasmine (Annapurna Sriram), a homeless woman living in the tunnels underneath Manhattan's West Side. Surviving on her own terms while trying to build a new life alone, she is reeling from the loss of her mother, who was deported when she was 16. Older now, Yasmine, struggles to rise from poverty as the perils of the underground fill her with despair.

Along her journey, Yasmine meets a cast of characters and real New York personalities, each living in their own form of exile: a lonely piano player who's never played his music out loud; a mother who regrets the birth of her six-year-old; a lonely grandmother nostalgic for her salsa music past and the Mission who is there to help, but only if she's willing to play by their rules.

== Cast ==
- Annapurna Sriram as Yasmine

== Production ==
The film was inspired by director Andrew Wonder's previous project tackling homelessness. Wonder first explored New York City's subway system with the documentary Undercity, where he and Steve Duncan spent time overnight with homeless individuals in both NYC and Las Vegas. Feral was shot within a month, utilizing a cast which included former homeless people and those who worked in the system.

Feral was produced by Wonder's company Tomorrow in association with Tony Award-nominated production company HIPZEE. Executive Producers included The Strange Ones's Michael Prall, and Above The Shadows's Tara Sickmeier and Robert Baunoch III.

== Release ==
Feral had its world premiere at the Sarasota Film Festival on April 7, 2019. The film screened at the Bushwick Film Festival where Sriram's performance earned a Best Actress Award. Feral had its international premiere in Montreal at the Festival Du Nouveau Cinéma on October 17, 2019. In 2020, 1091 Media acquired distribution rights to the film and it was released on video-on-demand and digital platforms on June 2, 2020.

== Reception ==
On review aggregator Rotten Tomatoes, the film holds an approval rating of 100% based on 12 reviews, with an average rating of 7.9/10.

The film was praised at the world premiere for the central performance of Annapurna Sriram. It was highlighted as a recommended film to watch for both the Bushwick Film Festival and the Festival Du Nouveau Cinéma.

Feral also received praise from top critics, with Glenn Kenny of The New York Times praising FERAL's "bravura, multilayered lead performance by Annapurna Sriram", John DeFore from The Hollywood Reporter describing the film as "a gritty but artful portrait" and Dennis Harvey of Variety reviewing Wonder's film as "a promising debut worthy of discerning viewers’ attention."
