= Where We Started (film) =

- Directed by: Christopher J. Hansen
- Written by: Christopher J. Hansen
- Produced by: Brian Elliott, Christopher J. Hansen
- Starring: Matthew Brumlow; Cora Vander Broek
- Cinematography: Taylor Rudd
- Edited by: Simon Tondeur
- Music by: Mike Hogan
- Production company: Theoretical Entertainment
- Distributed by: Indie Rights
- Release dates: 21 September 2013 (Knoxville Film Festival); 2 May 2014 (US)
- Running time: 105 minutes
- Country: United States
- Language: English

Where We Started is a 2013 American romantic drama film directed by Christopher J. Hansen, starring Matthew Brumlow and Cora Vander Broek.

== Cast ==
- Matthew Brumlow as Will Shelton
- Cora Vander Broek as Nora Van Der Graf
- Stan Denman as Liquor Store Clerk
- Nellsyn Hill as Restaurant Waitress
- Mallory Olivier as Diner Waitress

== Release ==
The film received a limited theatrical release on 2 May 2014.

== Reception ==
Sherilyn Connelly of LA Weekly wrote that "It all feels carefully scripted and rehearsed, with actors boasting terrific chemistry, who never seem like they're improvising or veering into mumblecore territory", and that it "will resonate with anyone who's ever clicked with the right person at the wrong time, or has wondered what it might be like."

Danny King of The Village Voice wrote that the film on the whole "remains an engaging platform for its actors, and Hansen's ability to maximize their work.

Gary Goldstein of the Los Angeles Times wrote that "There’s a kind of bland realism to writer-director Chris Hansen’s long night’s journey into morning. Some may recognize their own feelings of longing and regret. But for all the emotional onion-peeling here, little is revealed that’s surprising, unique or particularly deep."

Daniel M. Gold of The New York Times wrote that while the film "has its authentic moments", the relationship between Will and Nora "feels all too glib, a beat out of sync."
