= Augie Duke =

American actress

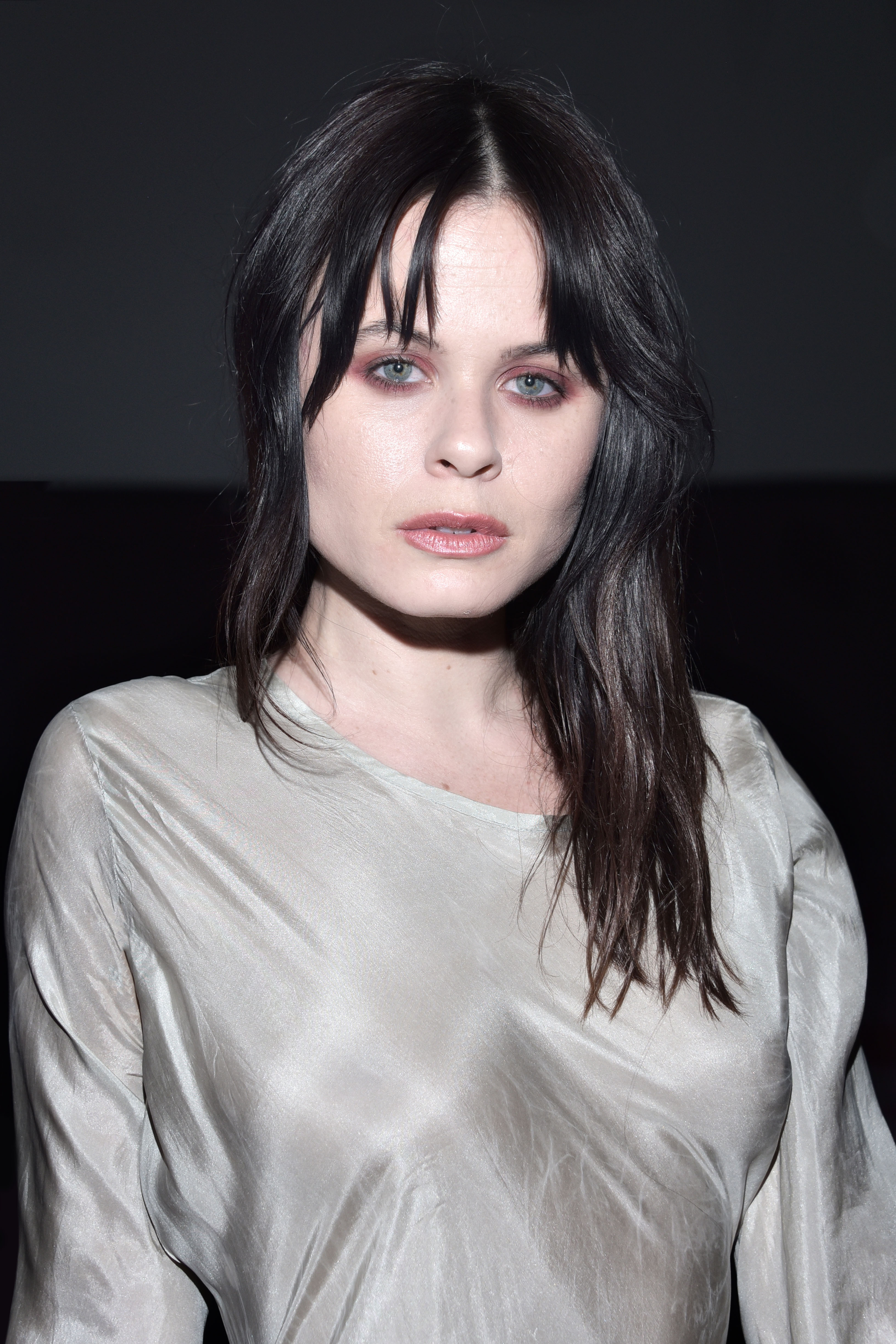
- Duke in 2017
- Born: Augustine Duke Kupper; February 4, 1986 (age 40); Santa Monica, California, U.S.
- Occupations: Actress; film director
- Years active: 2010–present
- Notable credits: Moon Garden; Bad Kids Go to Hell
- Television: Mayans M.C.
- Spouse: Michael Reed
- Children: Elvis
- Parent(s): Fredrica Duke; Daniel A Kupper, PhD

Augie Duke (born February 4, 1986) is an American actress who starred in Mayans M.C., Burning Kentucky, Bad Kids Go to Hell and the television series Chemistry.

== Filmography ==
Films
Year	Title	Role	Notes
2012	Teenage Bank Heist	Marie	
2012	Bad Kids Go to Hell	Veronica Harmon	
2013	6 Years, 4 Months & 23 Days	Ester	Short film
2014	Spring	Jackie	
2015	The Badger Game	Alex	
2017	The Black Room	Karen	
2019	Burning Kentucky	Jolene	
2019	Blood Craft	Serena	
2019	The Narcissists	Letty	
2019	Trauma is a Time Machine	Helen	
2019	Necropolis: Legion	Lisa	
2019	Exit 0	Lisa	
2019	Acceleration	Crimson	
2019	Wild Boar	Lamb	
2019	Barney Burman's Wild Boar	Scarlett Lamb	
2020	She's in Portland	Diedra	
2021	Antidote	Cassandra	
2021	6:45	Jules Rable	
2022	Drawn Into The Night	Brittany	
2022	Breathing Happy	Lilly	
2022	Moon Garden	Sara	
2022	Six	Prostitute #2	Short film
2023	Trinket Box	Ava Wilson	
2023	Static Codes	Angela Wiltz	
2025	Thou Shalt Kill	Shannon Donner	
2025	Hacked: A Double Entendre of Rage Fueled Karma	Amy Rumble	
2025	The Workout	Monroe	
2025	Horchata with Oatmilk	Billie	
2025	Clutch	Rally	
2025	Sincerely Saul	Becky Baby	

Television
Year	Title	Role	Notes
2010	Gravity		4 episodes
2011	Chemistry		9 episodes
2012	The Mentalist	Krista	Episode: "Something Rotten in Redmund"
2015	Criminal Minds	Jill Simmons	Episode: "Future Perfect"
2019	L.A. Confidential	Marla	TV movie
2020-2021	Gentefied	Nicole	Episode: "Protest Tacos"
2022-2023	Mayans M.C.	Treenie	15 episodes
2023	The Rookie	Raelynn Jameson	Episode: "Exposed"

== Awards ==
Festival	Year	Film	Category	Result	Ref.
Phoenix Film Festival	2013	6 Years, 4 Months & 23 Days	Copper Wing Award	Won	
Mammoth Film Festival	2019	Burning Kentucky	Best Actress	Won	
