= Fort Bliss (film) =

- Theatrical release poster
- Directed by: Claudia Myers
- Written by: Claudia Myers
- Produced by: Adam Silver; Brendan McDonald; Claudia Myers; John Sullivan; Patrick Cunningham
- Starring: Michelle Monaghan; Ron Livingston; Pablo Schreiber; Emmanuelle Chriqui; Dash Mihok
- Cinematography: Adam Silver
- Edited by: Carsten Kurpanek; Matt Chesse
- Music by: Asche & Spencer
- Production companies: Yeniceri Produksiyon A.S.; Voltage Pictures; Phase 4 Films
- Release date: April 29, 2014 (NBFF)
- Running time: 116 minutes
- Country: United States
- Language: English
- Box office: $669,247

Fort Bliss is a 2014 American drama film directed and written by Claudia Myers, a military-based drama set on Fort Bliss. The film stars Michelle Monaghan, Ron Livingston, Pablo Schreiber, Emmanuelle Chriqui, and Dash Mihok.

== Premise ==
After returning home from an extended tour in Afghanistan, a decorated U.S. Army medic and single mother struggles to rebuild her relationship with her young son.

== Cast ==
- Michelle Monaghan as Maggie Swann
- Ron Livingston as Richard
- Pablo Schreiber as Staff Sergeant Donovan
- Emmanuelle Chriqui as Alma
- Dash Mihok as Staff Sergeant Malcolm
- Freddy Rodriguez as Cpt. Garver
- Gbenga Akinnagbe as Sgt. Butcher
- John Savage as Mike Swann
- Manolo Cardona as Luis
- Juan Gabriel Pareja as Javier
- Drew Garrett as SPC Cook
- Jacob Browne as 1st Sgt. Jeff Killens
- Fahim Fazli as Afghan Driver
- Oakes Fegley as Paul Swann (son)

== Production ==
=== Casting ===
In October 2011 Michelle Monaghan was added to the cast to play the lead character. On April 5, 2012 Ron Livingston signed on to star opposite Monaghan.

=== Filming ===
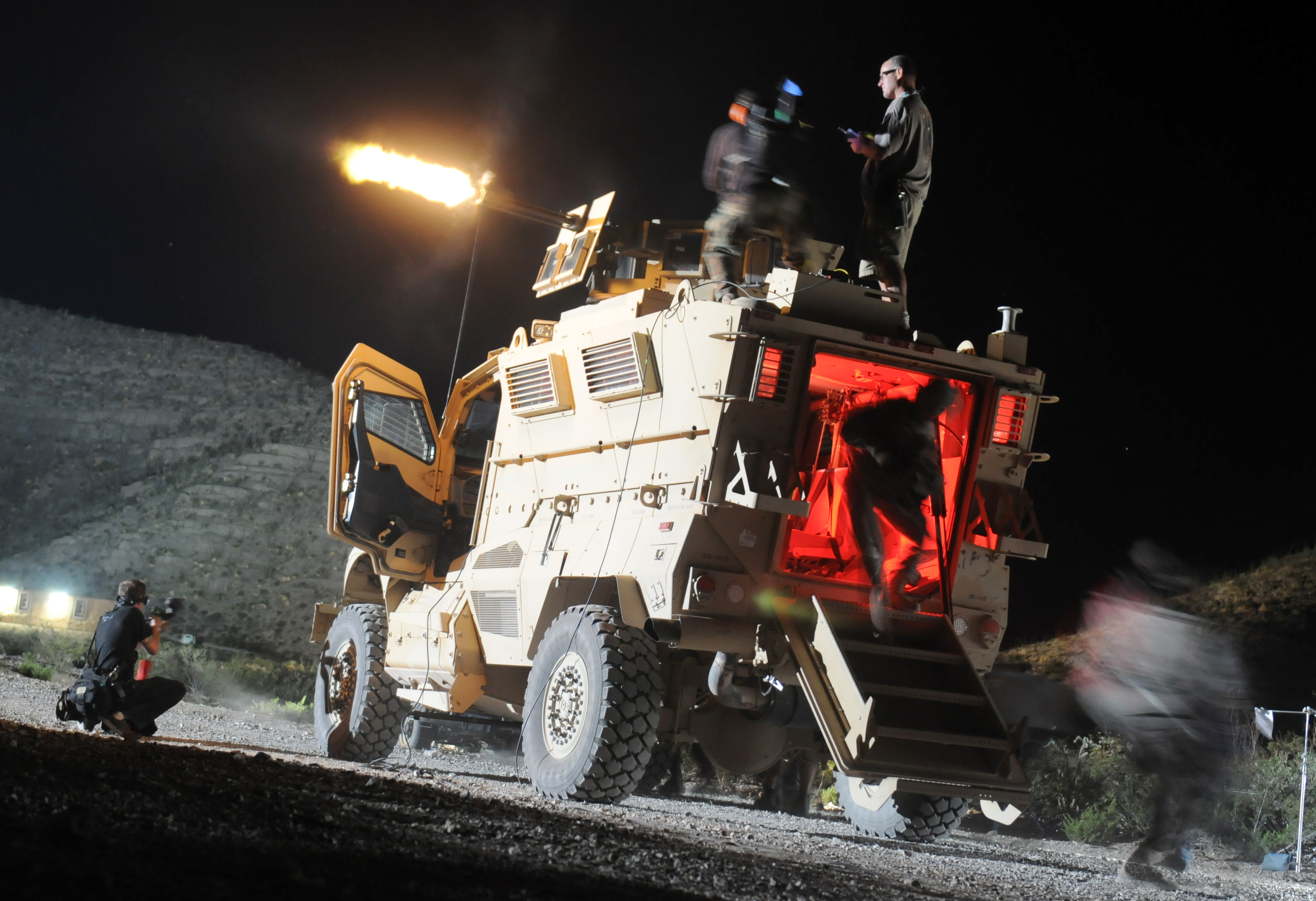
Michelle Monaghan filming at Fort Bliss, with soldiers assigned to Troop B, 2nd Squadron, 13th Cavalry Regiment, 4th Brigade Combat Team, 1st Armored Division

Filming began in September 2012 in Los Angeles and later moved to Fort Bliss in El Paso, Texas.

=== Premiere ===
Fort Bliss premiered on September 11, 2014 at the DGA Theater in Los Angeles. The premiere was hosted by the organization Veterans in Film and Television.

== Reception ==
On Rotten Tomatoes, the film holds an approval rating of 75% based on 16 reviews, with an average rating of 6.6/10. On Metacritic, the film has a weighted average score of 68 out of 100 based on 13 critics, indicating "generally favorable" reviews.
