= Kettle of Fish (film) =

- Film poster
- Directed by: Claudia Myers
- Written by: Claudia Myers
- Produced by: Agathe David-Weill; Blythe Frank; Marc Lazard; Michael Mailer
- Starring: Matthew Modine; Gina Gershon
- Cinematography: Neil Lisk
- Edited by: Pete Beaudreau
- Music by: David Tobocman
- Release date: April 27, 2006 (Tribeca)
- Running time: 97 minutes
- Country: United States
- Language: English

Kettle of Fish is a 2006 American romantic comedy film written and directed by Claudia Myers and starring Matthew Modine and Gina Gershon.

== Plot ==
Mel is a saxophonist in his forties who lives alone with a goldfish named Daphne and has not yet decided what to do with his life. After several adventures that usually end in one night, he decides that the Swedish Inga is for him and goes to live with her deciding to sublet her apartment for a month to Ginger, a slightly neurotic English biologist, who studies the love behavior of women. frogs. During a wedding engagement, Mel meets his bride, Diana, a beautiful woman, who is marrying to a yogurt magnate, and is deeply drawn to her.

The story with Inga soon reveals itself as all the others and Mel returns to her house where she has to negotiate with Ginger for the use of the apartment. Meanwhile, he sets out on the trail of the beautiful Diana, who he cannot forget thinking she is the woman of his dreams. After finally finding her, he begins to neglect his job as a player by being hired as an elevator attendant in the condominium where Diana lives, much neglected by her husband.

But even this time, he realizes that the story cannot go on, being deeply in love with Ginger. A deep sympathy arises between the two also because of Ginger's experiments involving Mel and her goldfish.

== Cast ==
- Matthew Modine as Mel
- Gina Gershon as Ginger
- Christy Scott Cashman as Diana
- Isiah Whitlock Jr. as Freddie
- Kevin J. O'Connor as Harry
- Lois Chiles as Jean
- Stephen Mailer as Band Leader
- Ewa Da Cruz as Inga
- Fisher Stevens as Bruce
- Eddie Kaye Thomas as Sean

== Music ==
The film's original jazz songs were composed by and performed on the tenor saxophone by Ryan Shore.

Ryan Shore performs the saxophone solos which were mimed on camera by Matthew Modine.

== Reception ==
The film has an 18% rating on Rotten Tomatoes.
