= Elizabeth A. Davis =

American actress

- Born: Dumas, Texas, U.S.
- Education: Baylor University (BFA); Case Western Reserve University (MFA)
- Occupations: Actor, musician
- Years active: 2006–present
- Spouse: Jordan Richard (2008–present)

Elizabeth Anne Davis known professionally as Elizabeth A. Davis, is an American actress and musician known for her work in the musical Once, for which she was nominated for the Tony Award for Best Performance by a Featured Actress in a Musical in 2012. She was also nominated for a Drama Desk Award for Outstanding Featured Actress in a Musical for her performance in the musical Allegro in 2015.

== Early life ==
Elizabeth Anne Davis was born in Dumas, Texas, and raised in Channing, Texas, the daughter of Melody (née Brown) and Frank Davis. She also has a brother named Jonathan. Her father is the former superintendent of the Channing Independent School District, and both of her parents are involved in the arts. Her mother is a former speech coach and teacher who earned her master's degree in Speech Communication from West Texas A&M University in 1982. She graduated from Channing High School, received her Bachelor in Fine Arts degree from Baylor University and her Master of Fine Arts from Case Western Reserve University-Cleveland Play House acting program in Cleveland, Ohio. While at Baylor, Davis met her husband, Jordan Richard, a television director. Davis plays the violin.

== Career ==
Davis first started out her professional career as a college student playing the lead role in the Texas Musical Drama in the Palo Duro Canyon State Park.

Davis is seen as the Romanian "Nadia" on the New York-shot Taxi: Brooklyn. She was also seen in FOX's Fringe in the "Ability" episode and on One Life to Live.

Davis has appeared in numerous Off-Broadway and regional theatre productions, including the Off-Broadway production of Wolves as Kay at the 59E59 Theatre. She played the role of Sister James in Doubt at the Gulfshore Playhouse in Naples, Florida and starred as Blanche Dubois in a production of A Streetcar Named Desire at the Cleveland Playhouse. She played the role of Célimène in a New Jersey Shakespeare Festival production of The Misanthrope and has also understudied the lead female role in the New World Stages production of The 39 Steps. She starred in The Starship Astov at the Midtown International Theatre Festival, for which she was nominated for a MITF Best Actress award. Davis also starred as Emily Dickinson in Emily at Theatre Row for which she won the New York Innovative Theater Award for Outstanding Actress in a Lead Role.

Davis is best known for originating the role of Réza, the Czech roommate of leading lady Cristin Milioti in Once, a stage musical version of the Academy Award-winning film Once. Davis originated the role of Réza at the American Repertory Theatre at Harvard University and Off-Broadway at the New York Theatre Workshop. Her final performance as Réza in Once was on March 24, 2013. Once opened on Broadway on March 18, 2012 and received 11 Tony nominations, including Best Musical. For this role she was nominated for a Tony Award for Best Featured Actress in a Musical. In May 2013, she joined Christopher Lloyd and composer, Duncan Sheik in Classic Stage Company's rare production of Bertolt Brecht's Caucasian Chalk Circle.

In April through May 2014, Davis starred in Four Last Things at the American Globe Theater.

Beginning in May 2022, Davis starred as Thomas Jefferson in the American Repertory Theater production of 1776.

== Stage credits ==
Year	Production	Role	Location	Category
2012–2013	Once	Reza	Bernard B. Jacobs Theatre	Broadway
2022	1776	Thomas Jefferson	American Airlines Theatre	Broadway

== Off-Broadway ==
Year	Production	Role
2018	The Resistible Rise of Arturo Ui	Giri
2018	My Name's Not Indian Joe	Liz
2017	King Lear	Goneril
2016	Dust Can't Kill Me	Angelina
2015	Zorba!	The Widow
2014	Allegro	Jennie
2014	Four Last Things	Jane
2013	Caucasian Chalk Circle	Grusha
2012	Joe	Playwright/Performer
2011	Once	Réza / Violinist
2010–2011	The 39 Steps	Woman (U/S – Performer)
2010	Wolves	Kay
2011	Dally with the Devil	Megan
2009	Emily	Emily Dickinson
2008	Of Mice and Men	Curley’s Wife
2008	The Cherry Orchard	Varya
—	Grace	Sarah

== Regional Theatre ==
Year	Production	Role
2022	1776	Thomas Jefferson
2019	Buzz	Buzz
2019	Indecent	The Female Middle (Actor 3)
2016	Rain	Anna
2015	Indian Joe	Liz / Book, Music, Lyrics
—	MacBeth Again	Becca
2011	Once	Réza
2014	The Devil’s Disciple	Judith
2011	The Misanthrope	Celimene
2008	Ride The Tiger	Judy
2009	Doubt	Sister James
2007	Opus	Grace
—	Well	Lisa (U/S)
—	A Streetcar Named Desire	Stella

== Film/TV ==
Year	Production	Role	Notes
2025	Daredevil: Born Again	Sofija Ozola	Episode: "Sic Semper Systema"
2021	Navigating Hollywood	Herself	Episode: "Elizabeth A. Davis: Broadway Actress & Jordan Richard: Director at NBC News"
2019	New Amsterdam	Shana Davis	Episode: "What the Heart Wants"
2019	The Wisdom Tooth	Susy	
2019	Ben Platt: "Older"	Megan	Music video
2018	Trauma is a Time Machine	Georgia	
2016	Blur Circle	Heather	
2015; 2019	Law & Order: SVU	Alessandra Bay, Gemma Brooks	2 episodes
2015	The Jim Gaffigan Show	Roxie	Episode: "Super Great Daddy Day"
2015	Blue Bloods	Tatiana	Episode: "Bad Company"
2014	Taxi Brooklyn	Nadia	Episode: "Cherchez les Femmes"
2014	Fringe	Joanne	Episode: "Ability"
2011	All My Children	Single Gal	
2007	Nora Falls	—	

== Special appearances ==
Year	Program
2012	The Today Show
2012	The David Letterman Show
2012	The Tony Awards
2012	CBS Thanksgiving Day Parade

== Awards and nominations ==
Year	Award	Category	Work	Result
2012	Tony Award	Best Performance by a Featured Actress in a Musical	Once	Nominated
2015	Drama Desk Award	Outstanding Featured Actress in a Musical	Allegro	Nominated
