= Brionne Davis =

American actor (born 1976)

- Born: Brionne Davis; 1976 (age 48–49); Dallas, Texas, U.S.
- Occupation: Actor

Brionne Davis (born in Dallas, Texas, 1976) is an American actor, director, and producer of theater, film, and TV. Davis grew up in Paris, Texas and has developed his career in theater, TV, and indie films in Austin, New York City, and currently in Los Angeles.

Davis is best known for his leading role in the Academy Award nominee Embrace of the Serpent (2015), in which he plays a character based on the American ethnobotanist Richard Evans Schultes.

== Filmography ==
=== Film ===
Year	Title	Role	Notes
1998	Bone Snap	Federico	Short
2003	Holding Patterns	Blue	Short
2003	Jesse's Closet	Chris Elliott	
2003	Black-eyed	Boyfriend	Short
2005	The Details of His Death	Stephen Files	Short
2005	MakeOver Bandits	Fabulo	Short
2006	Holidays with Heather	The Frenchman	Short
2008	Systolic	White Shoes	Short
2008	Agent 5: A Night in the Last Life of	Brit Alley Thug	
2008	Rest Stop: Don't Look Back	The Driver	Video
2008	The Night Grift	Flynn	Short
2012	Dorothy and the Witches of Oz	Simon	
2012	Plant Life	Stuart	Video short
2013	The A.A. Meeting	Hank	Short
2013	Gentleman Explorers	Agent Dodge	
2013	Avenged	Cody	
2013	Chase Me Through	Joanna's Father	Short
2014	Narcissist	Rob	Short
2014	Misbehaving	Man on the Street	Short
2015	Embrace of the Serpent	Evan	
2015	Fire City: End of Days	Tripp	
2015	High Yellow	Michael	Short
2016	Better Criminal	Det. William Rocha	
2016	Enlightenment Lite	Charlie	Short
2017	Mom and Dad	Tanner	
2022	Moon Garden	Alex	
TBA	Never Stop	Big Ten	Short, post-production

=== Television ===
Year	Title	Role	Notes
2007	Pandemic	Man at ATM	TV film
2011	The Witches of Oz	Simon	"1.1"
2013	Mingle	Homeless Guy	TV film
2015	Atticus' Activists	Mr. President	Episode: "Origin of Atticus"
2015	Ray Donovan	Garth	Episode: "Ding"
2018	Castle Rock	Garrett Coyne	Episode: "Habeas Corpus"
