= The Badger Game (film) =

2014 film

- Film poster
- Directed by: Joshua Wagner; Thomas Zambeck
- Written by: Joshua Wagner; Thomas Zambeck
- Produced by: Joshua Wagner; Thomas Zambeck
- Starring: Augie Duke; Patrick Cronen; Jillian Leigh; Sam Boxleitner; Sasha Higgins
- Cinematography: Zac Adams
- Edited by: Ethan Maniquis
- Music by: London May and RJ Gallentine
- Release date: September 26, 2014 (Arizona Underground)
- Running time: 99 minutes
- Country: United States
- Language: English

The Badger Game is a 2014 comedic thriller film written and directed by Joshua Wagner and Thomas Zambeck. The film centers on a trio of scorned women who conspire to abduct and blackmail a wealthy philanderer. Things go awry when unforeseen complications – and ulterior motives – pit the kidnappers against each other.

The Badger Game had its world premiere at the 2014 Arizona Underground Film Festival and had its international premiere at the Twisted Celluloid Film Festival in Cork, Ireland. The film was released on digital VOD by Stadium Media in June 2015, and on Blu-ray and DVD by Intervision Picture Corp in November 2015.

== Premise ==
Alex (Augie Duke) and Jane (Sasha Higgins) are the bitter mistresses of Liam (Sam Boxleitner), a married man with money to burn and a healthy appetite for infidelity. Together, they hatch a plan to kidnap their cheating boyfriend and extort him for millions.

To execute the caper, Alex enlists the help of Kip (Patrick Cronen), her unhinged brother, and Shelly (Jillian Leigh), her childhood friend. Sensing Shelly's financial desperation, Alex convinces her to bait Liam into a compromising position, at which point Kip will subdue him long enough to extort a healthy ransom.

Donning rubber animal masks, the captors tie-up Liam and confine him to a locked garage. There, they show him a series of incriminating photos and threaten to tell his wife, unless he buys their silence. Liam proves to be less-than-cooperative, and in the long night ahead, the four would-be schemers are forced to reconcile impossible odds, and test the limits of their own morality.

== Cast ==
- Augie Duke as Alex
- Patrick Cronen as Kip
- Jillian Leigh as Shelly
- Sam Boxleitner as Liam
- Sasha Higgins as Jane
- Marc Siciliani as Clive
- Aria London as Victoria
- Josh Eichenbaum as The Bartender

== Awards ==
- Best Drama, Laughlin International Film Festival
- Best Thriller, PollyGrind Film Festival
- Best Supporting Actress (Jillian Leigh), PollyGrind Film Festival
- "Most Cool" Film, PollyGrind Film Festival
