= Adam the First =

2024 film directed by Irving Franco

- Directed by: Irving Franco
- Starring: Oakes Fegley; David Duchovny; Larry Pine; T. R. Knight
- Production companies: Randomix Productions; Crystal City Entertainment; Adam 1 Pictures
- Distributed by: Nova Vento Entertainment; Electric Entertainment
- Release date: February 14, 2024
- Running time: 103 minutes
- Country: United States
- Language: English

Adam the First is a 2024 drama film written and directed by Irving Franco. It was released by Nova Vento Entertainment in select theaters in the United States on February 14, 2024, and on May 14, 2024, via streaming by Electric Entertainment.

== Synopsis ==
A 14-year-old boy sets out across the country to meet a series of men who could be his father.

== Cast ==
- Oakes Fegley as Adam
- David Duchovny as James
- T.R. Knight as Jacob Jr.
- Larry Pine as Jacob #3
- Billy Slaughter as The Bounty Hunter
- Jason Dowies as Jacob Watterson #2
- Eric Hanson as Jacob #1

== Production ==
On October 31, 2022, it was announced that David Duchovny would star in the film, alongside Oakes Fegley and T.R. Knight. Adam the First was filmed in Mississippi.

== Reception ==
On the review aggregator website Rotten Tomatoes, 100% of 9 critics' reviews are positive.

At Film Threat, Allan Ng gave it a 7.5/10 rating saying that the film "explores what it means to be a family from the perspective of an outsider desperately wanting to find the truth." At Common Sense Media, Jeffrey M. Anderson gave it a 3/5 rating saying that "frequently feeling a bit shallow or underwritten (and sometimes even exasperating), this drama is nonetheless held together by its undeniable earnestness and poignant lead performance."

Prairie Miller of WBAI Radio said that "suffice it to say, that whatever conventional circumstances exist in the real world concerning lost and found children, best to enter this tale of somewhat biblical proportions as suggested in the title, with an extraordinarily open mind."
