= Moon Garden (film) =

2022 American dark fantasy horror film

- Promotional release poster
- Directed by: Ryan Stevens Harris
- Written by: Ryan Stevens Harris
- Produced by: John Michael Elfers
- Starring: Augie Duke; Brionne Davis; Haven Lee Harris; Maria Olsen; Timothy Lee DePriest; Phillip E. Walker; Morgana Ignis
- Music by: Michael Deragon
- Production company: Fire Trial Films
- Distributed by: Oscilloscope Laboratories
- Release dates: June 10, 2022 (DWF); 2023 (United States)
- Running time: 96 minutes
- Country: United States
- Language: English
- Budget: $74,000
- Box office: $48,758

Moon Garden is a 2022 American dark fantasy horror film written and directed by Ryan Stevens Harris, and starring Haven Lee Harris in her feature film debut, Augie Duke, Brionne Davis, Maria Olsen, Timothy Lee DePriest, Philip E. Walker, and Morgana Ignis. The film follows a young girl named Emma (Haven Lee Harris) who slips into a coma and finds herself in a surreal, industrial dream world where she is haunted by a monster who feeds off her tears.

Moon Garden premiered at the 25th Dances With Films Festival on June 10, 2022. The film was given a limited theatrical release in the United States by Oscilloscope Laboratories in May 2023.

== Plot ==
Little Emma falls down the stairs after she sees her parents arguing. She then begins oscillating between a steampunk world where she is pursued by a terrifying creature, and the physical world where she is in a coma. She hears her mother speaking and singing to her in memories and crossover moments. She is gifted a transistor radio to help her find her way back. She can also use it to hear her parents speaking to her by her hospital bed.

== Cast ==
- Haven Lee Harris as Emma
- Augie Duke as Sara
- Brionne Davis as Alex
- Maria Olsen as Princess
- Timothy Lee DePriest as Groom
- Philip E. Walker as Musician
- Morgana Ignis as Teeth

== Production ==
The film was shot on a combination of an Arricam LT, Arriflex 35 BL4S, Arriflex 35 IIC, Arriflex 35-IIIBell, and the Howell Eyemo, using rehoused vintage lenses. To accomplish a lot of the film’s practical effects, miniature models and cloud tanks were used. About 100,000 ft of expired 35mm film stock was used to shoot the film, intentionally using the heavier grain, loss of light sensitivity, color shifts, and light leaks to add to the surreal nature of the industrial dream environment Emma navigates in the film.

== Release ==
Moon Garden had its world premiere at the 25th Dances With Films Festival in Los Angeles, California, on June 10, 2022. On October 8, 2022, the film screened at the Grimmfest Film Festival in the United Kingdom. On November 3, 2022, it screened at the 9th FilmQuest Film Festival in Provo, Utah. In April 2023, it screened at Panic Fest in Kansas City, Missouri.

Moon Garden was released in select cinemas in the United States by Oscilloscope Laboratories in May 2023.

== Reception ==
On the review aggregator website Rotten Tomatoes, 86% of 29 critics' reviews are positive, with an average rating of 7.7/10. The website's consensus reads: "If writer-director Ryan Stevens Harris' story is somewhat less compelling than his bizarrely transfixing visuals, Moon Garden remains a mind-bending achievement of dark DIY fantasy."

Sharai Bohannon of Dread Central praised the film's setting and the Teeth character, and wrote, "Moon Garden's world, and the imagery it provides, are what will keep audiences talking. It's so absorbing that it makes it hard to dwell on things that aren't working in the film."
