= Wildside (American TV series) =

Western television series

- Genre: Western
- Created by: Tom Greene
- Written by: Walter Brough; Tom Greene; Steve Johnson; Jonathan Torp; William Whitehead
- Directed by: Tom Greene; Harvey S. Laidman; Richard C. Sarafian
- Starring: Howard Rollins; William Smith; Sandy McPeak; J. Eddie Peck; Terry Funk; John D'Aquino; Meg Ryan
- Composer: Jack Elliott
- Country of origin: United States
- Original language: English
- No. of seasons: 1
- No. of episodes: 6

Production
- Executive producers: E. Arthur Kean; Tom Greene
- Producer: William F. Phillips
- Cinematography: Roland "Ozzie" Smith
- Editors: Robert Florio; Michael Sheridan
- Camera setup: Single-camera
- Running time: 48 mins.
- Production companies: Tom Greene Productions Inc.; Touchstone Television

Original release
- Network: ABC
- Release: March 21 – April 25, 1985

Wildside is an American television series aired by ABC from March to April 1985. The series stars William Smith, J. Eddie Peck, Howard Rollins, Sandy McPeak, Terry Funk, John D'Aquino, and Meg Ryan.

The series aired for six episodes, from March 21 to April 25, 1985.

== Plot ==
Five outlaws once roamed the U.S. Western territories. The leader and organizer was J. Wendell Summerhayes, while the other members were Brodie Hollister, Varges de la Cosa, Bannister Sparks, and Prometheus Jones. The five outlaws went straight and Summerhayes became the governor of California. The other four men became businessmen in the town of Wildside, CA, and form the "Chamber of Commerce." Brodie's son Sutton was raised in the East by Brodie's wife but traveled to Wildside to be with his father. Although Wildside is normally peaceful, trouble inevitably arises either when criminals come to town or when Summerhayes appeal to his former gang members for help. When their services are needed, the five men don their weapons and go on a "hunting party" to deal with the problem.

The series was produced by Touchstone Television, a then-new division of Walt Disney Productions. Although it featured several shootouts and fistfights per episode, there were very few on-screen deaths. Much of the violence was presented in a stylized and bloodless manner, similar to that of The A-Team.

== Characters ==
Character	Actor
Brodie Hollister, expert marksman. Works as a horse breeder and trainer.	William Smith
Sutton Hollister, also an expert marksman and learned fencing at an Eastern college. Works with his father raising horses.	J. Eddie Peck
Varges de la Cosa, expert with throwing weapons, favors bolos and knives. Works as a gun salesman, although he despises them personally.	John D'Aquino
Bannister Sparks, demolitions expert. Runs a mercantile business.	Howard Rollins
Prometheus Jones, extremely strong and expert with a lasso. Works as the town veterinarian.	Terry Funk
Cally Oaks, editor of the Wildside newspaper, attracted to Sutton Hollister.	Meg Ryan
Governor J.W. Summerhayes, governor of California.	Sandy McPeak
Alice Freeze the young and attractive town mortician. Romantically interested in Varges, and intrigued by death.	Robin Hoff
Skillet, the long-suffering chef at the town's restaurant.	Timothy Scott
Elliot Throgmorton, Cally Oaks' assistant editor.	Kurt Fuller
Zeke, a local boy.	Jason Hervey

== Reception and cancellation ==
Wildside was aired as a mid-season replacement and put on Thursday nights against the popular The Cosby Show. Due to low ratings, the series was canceled after one month.

== Episodes ==
=== Season 1 ===
No.	Title	Original release date
1	"Well-Known Secret"	March 21, 1985
A Confederate general and his men tear up California towns looking for a hidden cache of Union gold.
2	"Delinquency of a Miner"	March 28, 1985
The villainous Pike advertises for miners and then forces them to slave for him.
3	"The Crimea of the Century"	April 4, 1985
A rogue brigade of British cavalry come to Wildside to drive out farmers so they can obtain their oil rights.
4	"Don't Keep the Home Fires Burning"	April 11, 1985
An arson gang arrives in Wildside and attempts to set the town afire if their "insurance" isn't paid.
5	"Buffalo Who?"	April 18, 1985
Buffalo Bill and his Traveling Show arrive in Wildside, but it's a ploy by imposters to assassinate the visiting Spanish ambassador.
6	"Until the Fat Lady Sings"	April 25, 1985
A gunfighter who Brodie crippled comes to Wildside seeking revenge, and has designed a machine pistol to dispose of his enemy.
