= Everything Put Together =

- Directed by: Marc Forster
- Written by: Marc Forster; Adam Forgash; Catherine Lloyd Burns
- Produced by: Sean Furst
- Starring: Radha Mitchell; Megan Mullally; Louis Ferreira
- Cinematography: Roberto Schaefer
- Edited by: Matt Chesse
- Music by: Thomas Koppel
- Distributed by: Vitagraph Films
- Release dates: January 24, 2000 (Sundance Film Festival); November 2, 2001 (U.S.)
- Running time: 87 minutes
- Country: United States
- Language: English
- Box office: $2,963

Everything Put Together is a 2000 drama film directed by Marc Forster starring Radha Mitchell, Megan Mullally and Louis Ferreira. The story focuses on a Californian couple expecting a child and their group of friends who are confronted with the tragedy of a big loss.

The film premiered at the 2000 Sundance Film Festival and later received a limited theatrical release in North America on November 2, 2001.

== Plot ==
Angie and Russ, a couple in an affluent California suburb, are expecting a baby. The couple excitedly prepares for impending parenthood by celebrating with their closest friends, including Angie's girlfriends Judith and Barbie, both of whom are also expecting. Angie and Russ’ bliss is abruptly shattered with an unexpected loss when their newborn succumbs to SIDS. As Angie spirals into depression from her grief, she finds herself ostracized by Judith and Barbie, who assume she wants solitude to deal with the loss.

== Cast ==
- Radha Mitchell as Angie
- Megan Mullally as Barbie
- Louis Ferreira as Russ
- Matt Malloy as Dr. Reiner
- Mark Boone Junior as Bill
- Catherine Lloyd Burns as Judith
- Michele Hicks as April
- Alan Ruck as Kessel
- Judy Geeson as Angie's Mother

== Production ==
The film, which is Forster's directorial debut, was shot in two weeks on a digital camera on a budget of less than $10,000.

Everything Put Together premiered at the 2000 Sundance Film Festival, where it garnered comparisons to films like Rosemary's Baby. The distribution arm of American Cinematheque picked up the film and released it in a limited rollout that nearly coincided with the release of Forster's follow-up, Monster's Ball.

== Critical reception ==
On Rotten Tomatoes, the film has an approval rating of 69% based on 29 reviews. Metacritic, which uses a weighted average, assigned the film a score of 63 out of 100, based on 12 critics, indicating "generally favorable" reviews.

Emanuel Levy of Variety called it a "riveting, haunting chronicle" and praised Mitchell's performance. He noted the film's weakest aspects, such as the development of characters besides Angie's, "are almost overcome by Forster’s bravura visual style, endowing a rather familiar story with a fresh, bold treatment."

Stephen Holden of The New York Times critiqued the film's tonal clashes, noting that on one level, the film plays as a "sober educational seminar on sudden infant death syndrome,” while on another level, "it is a psychological horror film that follows Angie's descent into a clinical depression accompanied by scary delusional fantasies." Holden said the film was most effective in its "expressionistic critique of the suburban baby culture and its joys, fears and fetishes. Its satirically edged view of a group of pregnant women preparing for motherhood recalls the creepy scenes of suburban togetherness in Todd Haynes's film Safe", adding, "If the movie's horror effects lend Everything Put Together an aura of creepiness, the scenes that hurt most are those in which she runs into old friends who can barely stifle their panic as they seek to flee her contaminating presence."

Owen Gleiberman of Entertainment Weekly was more critical and gave the film a grade of "B-", writing the film "is too responsible to erupt into the kind of operatic maternal horror it keeps threatening the audience with."

=== Accolades ===
At the 2001 Independent Spirit Awards, Forster won the Someone to Watch Award and was nominated for the John Cassavetes Award for Best Feature Under $500,000.
