= Give or Take (film) =

- Directed by: Paul Riccio
- Produced by: Paul Riccio; Jamie Effros; Angela Malley; Kevin Matusow; David Kuhn
- Starring: Norbert Leo Butz: Jamie Effros; Joanne Tucker; Cheri Oteri; Louis Cancelmi
- Cinematography: Federico Cantini, ADF
- Edited by: Mike Rizzo
- Music by: Breanna Barbara
- Production companies: Two Hands; None Trick Pony; Fligsnap Films; Traveling Picture Show Company
- Distributed by: Breaking Glass Pictures (North America); A2 (Latin America)
- Release dates: July 25, 2020 (Woods Hole Film Festival); February 11, 2022 (Theatrical)
- Running time: 103 minutes
- Country: United States
- Language: English

Give or Take is a 2020 American comedy drama film directed by Paul Riccio. Riccio co-wrote the film with Jamie Effros who starred in a leading role.

== Synopsis ==
Martin, a pragmatic finance guy living in New York City, thinks he's checked all the boxes of an acceptable life yet feels disconnected, especially from his father, Kenneth, a distant man Martin could never figure out. Their relationship got more complicated when Kenneth, a retired lawyer living on Cape Cod, came out after his wife died and quickly found love with a younger man, Ted, a local landscaper, who eventually moved in. For the first time Kenneth was able to live openly and honestly as a gay man. When Kenneth unexpectedly dies, Martin heads up to the Cape where he's forced to finally deal with Ted and a house full of memories. After a few rounds circling and butting heads, Martin and Ted slowly make space for each other and their own grief while reconciling how to remember Kenneth, the different man they both loved, and the significance of what he left behind.

== Cast ==
- Norbert Leo Butz as Ted
- Jamie Effros as Martin
- Joanne Tucker as Emma
- Cheri Oteri as Patty King
- Louis Cancelmi as Terrence
- Annapurna Sriram as Lauren
- Jaden Waldman as Colin
- Dennis Cunningham as Ollie
- Garry Mitchell as Wallace Snow
- Shaun O’Hagan as Devon
- Roya Shanks as Melody
- Kyle Overstreet as Jeff
- Polly Lee as Pam
- Chris Fischer as Frank Piersall

== Production ==
Riccio and Effros wrote the script based upon an idea by Riccio and his own life experiences. The role of Ted was written specifically for Norbert Leo Butz. Production was postponed from the fall of 2018 to the spring of 2019 to accommodate Butz's commitment to the Broadway revival of My Fair Lady in which he starred as Alfred P. Doolittle. The film was shot almost entirely on Cape Cod in and around the towns of Orleans, Chatham, Eastham and Wellfleet.

== Release ==
The film premiered at the Woods Hole Film Festival in July 2020. Due to the COVID-19 pandemic, the entire festival was held virtually with films and talks streamed online. It went on to screen at festivals including the virtual Out on Film Festival in September, 2021 and the Provincetown Film Festival on June 16, 2021, at the Wellfleet Drive-In, which was used as a filming location in Give or Take.

The film was released in select theatres in the United States by Breaking Glass Pictures beginning February 11, 2022. It premiered at the Quad Cinema in New York City, the Laemmle Royal in Los Angeles and the Cape Cinema on Cape Cod before being released as a video on demand (VOD) in North America and Latin America.

== Reception ==
Critical reception for Give or Take has been positive, and the movie holds a rating of 95% on Rotten Tomatoes based on 29 reviews, with an average rating of 7.3/10.

San Jose Mercury News’ Randy Myers reviewed Give or Take, stating "It’s [Give or Take] a real find that celebrates caring people coming together rather than being torn apart by their differences." Steve Davis of The Austin Chronicle praised Norbert Leo Butz's performance as “revelatory” while also writing that, “There are just enough authentic moments of one-on-one connections and provincial preciousness in Give or Take to appreciate its unassuming generosity.” Gary Goldstein of the Los Angeles Times described the film as "sincere, often involving” and praised the actors for their "engaging", "skillful", and “robust” performances.

== Awards & festivals ==
- Audience Award for Best Narrative Feature at Woods Hole Film Festival
- Jury Award for Best Narrative Feature at Port Townsend Film Festival
- Jury Award for Best Ensemble at Out on Film
- Jury Award for Best Screenplay at Out on Film
- Jury Award for Best Narrative Feature at Monmouth Film Festival
- Jury Award for Best Supporting Actor (Norbert Leo Butz) at FilmOut San Diego
