= Taxi 0-22 =

Canadian television comedy series

Taxi 0-22 is a Canadian television comedy series, which aired on TVA, a Quebec-based French language network in Canada.

The series stars Patrick Huard as Montreal cab driver Rogatien Dubois Jr. The first season is predominantly set inside Dubois's dark blue taxi, a Ford Crown Victoria, and the comedy unfolds through his interactions – usually opinionated and deeply held – with the guest stars and other passengers who ride in his cab. Season two expanded the show's narrative to focus more on stories and characters outside of his taxi. Dubois speaks a thickly accented and rapidly delivered Quebec slang.

The first season of the show commenced broadcast in February 2007, the second in January 2008, the third in January 2009, and the fourth and final season began airing in September of 2009. It was broadcast at 9:00 p.m. on Thursday nights. TVA reported that more than one million viewers watched the show each week while the show's third season was airing in 2009.

Actor James Gandolfini was developing a pilot for an American adaptation, and the show was picked up by CBS two weeks prior to his death. While the show got a pilot order from CBS in 2014, it was not subsequently picked up for a full series.

== Regular characters ==
- Patrick Huard: Rogatien Dubois Jr.
- Yvon Deschamps: Rogatien's father
- François Arnaud: Rogatien's son
- Sylvie Boucher: Nancy, a server in a diner that Rogatien frequents.
