= Wild Oats (film) =

- Theatrical release poster
- Directed by: Andy Tennant
- Written by: Gary Kanew; Claudia Myers
- Produced by: Blythe Frank; Lucas Jarach; Kip Konwiser; Chris Ranta; Nicolas Veinberg; Dan Zisson
- Starring: Shirley MacLaine; Jessica Lange; Demi Moore; Billy Connolly; Santiago Segura; Howard Hesseman; Matt Walsh; Rebecca Da Costa
- Cinematography: José Luis Alcaine
- Edited by: Tracey Wadmore-Smith
- Music by: George Fenton
- Production companies: Wild Pictures; Defiant Pictures; Mountaintop Pictures; The Exchange
- Distributed by: The Weinstein Company; RADiUS-TWC
- Release dates: August 22, 2016 (TV); September 16, 2016 (United States)
- Running time: 86 minutes
- Country: United States
- Language: English
- Box office: $247,949

Wild Oats is a 2016 American comedy film directed by Andy Tennant and written by Gary Kanew and Claudia Myers. The film stars Shirley MacLaine, Jessica Lange, Demi Moore, and Billy Connolly. The film premiered on Lifetime on August 22, 2016, prior to being released in a limited release on September 16, 2016, by The Weinstein Company and RADiUS-TWC.

== Plot ==
When retired high school teacher Eva loses her husband, she mistakenly receives a $5,000,000 check on her deceased husband's $50,000 life insurance policy. Her friend Maddie, whose husband has just left her for a younger woman, convinces her to keep the money and they both depart to live it up at a resort on Gran Canaria, in the Canary Islands.

Once there, Eva is courted by an older gentleman who accompanies her in town. In the local casino she wins almost half a million euros despite knowing nothing about card games. Eva ends up in bed with him after a 7-year dry period without sex with her husband.

Her friend Maddie loses money, but finds a young virile man who has just lost his girlfriend, and happens to like older women. Their sex rejuvenates her, but in the process he strains his back.

In the meantime, the American insurance investigator is on Eva's trail, together with her mostly estranged daughter, to get back the $5,000,000 for the Beneficial Life Insurance Company, but they are trumped by the company's European representative who accepts a bribe to let her escape rather than sending her to the worst woman's prison in the Spanish-speaking world.

Maddie realizes that the older gentleman is a scam artist, and with the hotel detective finds out that he's working for Don Carlos, the richest man on the island. Eva and Maddie escape from the insurance investigator and go to Don Carlos, who is feared by everyone who knows him - except his firecracker of a Brazilian second wife, who tears into him when his bodyguard, who is her lover and the father of her child, is disturbed by the guard's gratuitous gun fire. Besides cheating older women, Don Carlos also swindles wine snobs by selling them inferior wine with impressive labels from classy estates, though the bottles are occasionally dropped by the older gentleman, who is known under various names including Bix.

The story ends on a happy note because Don Carlos gives Eva back her winnings: it turns out that Don Carlos was an exchange student in Liberty, IL, where Eva was everyone's favorite teacher, as has been said by various people who help her along during the movie.

After paying back the insurance company and paying her hotel bill, Eva still has over $200,000. She gives half to Maddie, who decides to stay a little longer with her young lover; and Eva goes back to the US. Later, at a beach ceremony, where Eva, her daughter and others seemingly are laying flowers on the ocean as a tribute to someone whom the audience may assume to be Maddie, it is revealed Maddie is fine, and has just married her young lover.

== Cast ==
- Shirley MacLaine as Eva Miller
- Jessica Lange as Maddie Reynolds
- Demi Moore as Crystal
- Billy Connolly as Chandler
- Santiago Segura as Carlos
- Eileen Grubba as Mrs. Krims
- Matt Walsh as Forbes
- Stephanie Beacham as Tammy
- Howard Hesseman as Vespucci
- Jay Hayden as Chip
- Rebecca Da Costa as Flavia
- Morgan Deare as Greg
- Mario de la Rosa as Antonio
- Antonio Ibáñez as Paco

== Production ==
The film's production history was a protracted one beset by financial difficulties and involving multiple crew and cast changes. On April 9, 2012, Dimension Films first acquired the film, with Howard Deutch set to direct and Shirley MacLaine, Jacki Weaver and Alan Arkin joining the cast. By September of that year, Jack Black, Maria Bello and Jon Voight were added to the cast. Weaver, Arkin, Black, Bello, and Voight would all eventually drop out to pursue other projects.

On October 17, 2013, Andy Tennant was announced to direct the film. On May 9, 2014, Jessica Lange replaced Weaver and Sarah Jessica Parker joined the cast. On June 11, 2014, Demi Moore replaced Sarah Jessica Parker after she dropped out. On June 21, 2014, Matt Walsh joined the cast of the film.

Las Vegas was originally intended as the lead characters' getaway destination, but the crew had to settle for the Canary Islands for tax purposes.

=== Filming ===
Principal photography began on June 10, 2014, in Gran Canaria, Canary Islands (Spain), and ended on July 15, 2014. The film has 43 credited producers.

The making of Wild Oats inspired Shirley MacLaine's 2016 memoir Above the Line: My 'Wild Oats' Adventure.

== Release ==
The film's distribution in the U.S. was set to be handled by The Weinstein Company—then also undergoing its own financial problems—and its international distribution was to be handled by Sony. The film ultimately premiered on Lifetime on August 22, 2016, and entered a limited release on September 16, that year. The film made just over $40,000 in domestic grosses.

The film holds a 0% approval from 5 critics on Rotten Tomatoes.

=== Lawsuit ===
In February 2017, Impex Entertainment filed a lawsuit against Sony Pictures Worldwide Acquisitions for $1 million alleging failure to pay a $855,000 licensing fee no later than 10 days following the film's theatrical release, and an additional $95,000 payment, which Sony refused to pay. In March 2017, Sony filed suit against one of the film's producers, stating the film's premiere on Lifetime breached a contractual theatrical requirement and thus, the licensing fees fall to him.
