= Endings (film) =

- Directed by: Chris Hansen
- Written by: Chris Hansen
- Produced by: Damon Crump
- Cinematography: John Franklin
- Release date: June 11, 2010 (Seattle True Independent Film Festival)
- Country: United States
- Language: English

Endings is the second feature film written and directed by Chris Hansen, a professor of film and digital media at Baylor University and the director of the university's film program. The film was shot on location in Waco, Texas, in June 2008, with Baylor University film students comprising a significant portion of the production crew. Post-production continued until April 2010. Endings has its world premiere at the True Independent Film Festival in Seattle in June 2010.

== Synopsis ==
A strung-out drug addict, Chris Ryan, holds his knife to a little girl’s throat (Emmy Ferguson) while the other patrons look on in horror.

Emmy Ferguson, a ten-year-old at home with her father, Charlie, who is medicating her for leukemia. She overhears a doctor telling him that she probably won’t live to see another day. Charlie clearly loves her and protects her as if it’s his only purpose in life, and he goes into a panic a little later when he finds Emmy missing from her room.

Adonna Frost, trying to get her family ready for the day. As they finally leave, she faints dead away.

Adonna’s doctor explains that her cancer is now advanced and that she should have been getting treatment.

After Chris steals from his mother to get drug money – and allows his friend to assault her – he is kidnapped by a group calling themselves the Death Prevention Squad. Chris, Adonna, and Emmy make another stop - for him to get drugs (only after Emmy coaxes Adonna to agree). Chris has to convince the dealer that he is for real, and he references Jamie, who told him about this dealer. The drug dealer provides him with what he wants and mentions that Jamie is coming over later. Chris is heartbroken and tries to buy off the dealer to get him not to sell drugs to Jamie Back in the car, Emmy wants to know how to take the drugs, so Chris (to Adonna's chagrin) demonstrates.

The police find Charlie at his ex-wife's place. They take him away for questioning and interview her. She tells them she was just Emmy's stepmom and that Emmy's real mom left the family years ago.

After stopping by a roadside carnival and a bridge at night, the three travelers make their way to their destination - which turns out to be a cemetery. Emmy's mom is dead and she wanted to visit her grave.

The sun has risen, and Chris and Adonna must decide what to do. Chris tells her he will call the police and stay with Emmy's body to explain. He tells her to go home to her family.

== Cast ==
- Emma Hansen as Emmy Ferguson
- Ellen Dolan as Adonna Frost
- Matthew Brumlow as Chris Ryan
- Joseph Frost as Charlie Ferguson

== Screenings ==
- Seattle's True Independent Film Festival 2010
- Atlanta Underground Film Festival 2010 (Best Director award)
- Southern Winds Film Festival 2010 (Best Dramatic Feature/”A Seriously Good Movie – Feature” Award)
- Dallas VideoFest 2010
- Secret City Film Festival 2010
- Trail Dance Film Festival 2011 (Best Screenplay, Chris Hansen)
- ReelHeART International Film Festival 2011
- Myrtle Beach International Film Festival 2011

== Awards ==
- Best Director (Atlanta Underground Film Festival 2010)
- Best Dramatic Feature/”A Seriously Good Movie – Feature” Award (Southern Winds Film Festival 2010)
- Best Screenplay, Chris Hansen (Trail Dance Film Festival 2011; also nominated for Best Feature Drama and Best Actor/Actress in a Feature, Emma Hansen)
