= John D'Aquino =

American actor (born 1958)

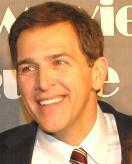
- D'Aquino in 2009
- Born: April 14, 1958 (age 68); New York City, U.S.
- Occupation: Actor
- Years active: 1985–present
- Website: http://www.johndaquino.net

John D'Aquino (born April 14, 1958) is an American film and television actor, best known for his role as Lieutenant Benjamin Krieg in seaQuest DSV, Joel in the film Pumpkinhead, U.S. President Richard Martinez in the Disney Channel Original Series Cory in the House, and for his appearance as Ulysses in Xena. He is also known for his roles as Frank LaMotta in Quantum Leap, Todd Gack in "The Calzone" episode of Seinfeld, and playing Sally's teacher boyfriend, Mr. Randell, in 3rd Rock from the Sun. Early in his career, he was credited as John Di Aquino or John DiAquino.

== Early life ==
Born in Brooklyn, D'Aquino was raised there and in Queens. In his childhood, he was a "self-admitted TV junkie." As a child, D'Aquino used to memorize every page of TV Guide.

== Career ==
D'Aquino's first television credit was a main cast role in the short-lived (six episodes) 1985 series Wildside, a mid-season replacement that was placed against The Cosby Show – the top-ranked show on television at the time. His first film credit was the 1987 film No Way Out.

D'Aquino has worked primarily on television. He has made guest appearances in episodes of Baywatch, Magnum P.I., Matlock, Melrose Place, Murder, She Wrote, Seinfeld, Sliders, Xena: Warrior Princess, Crossing Jordan, Hannah Montana, Monk, Shake It Up, Lois and Clark: The New Adventures of Superman and had recurring roles on 3rd Rock from the Sun, JAG, Quantum Leap, and co-starred in Comedy Central's That's My Bush! as Larry O'Shea.

== Filmography ==
=== Film ===
Year	Title	Role
1987	No Way Out	Lt. John Chadway
1988	Pumpkinhead	Joel
1988	Slipping Into Darkness	Fritz
2002	It's All About You	John
2005	Final Approach	Senator Claghorn
2009	The Telling	Victor
2013	Second Chances	Pearson
2014	Another Assembly	Sgt. Conrad Kane
2017	The 60 Yard Line	John Zagowski
2022	Breathing Happy	Dad

=== Television ===
Year	Title	Role	Notes
1985	Wildside	Varges De La Cosa	6 episodes
1985	Amazing Stories	Large Man	Episode: "Guilt Trip"
1986	Heart of the City	Solano	Episode: "Rock and Rumble"
1987	Head of the Class	Lance	Episode: "Privilege"
1987	21 Jump Street	Vinny Morgan	Episode: "My Future's So Bright, I Gotta Wear Shades"
1987	Magnum, P.I.	Nick Patrelli	Episode: "Infinity and Jelly Doughnuts"
1988	Ohara	Eric Leckner	Episode: "You Bet Your Life"
1988	Police Story: The Watch Commander	Lt. Carl Corelli	Television film
1988	The Dirty Dozen	Lebec	11 episodes
1989, 1992	Matlock	Dwayne Meeks / Jim Roper	2 episodes
1989, 1992, 1993	Quantum Leap	Frank LaMotta / Tonchi	3 episodes
1990–91	Shades of LA	Det. Michael Burton	18 episodes
1991	P.S. I Luv U	Young Mo Hornsby	Episode: "What's Up, Bugsy?"
1992	Nightmare Cafe	Al	Episode: "Nightmare Cafe"
1992	Tequila and Bonetti	Chad Rydell	Episode: "Reel Life"
1992	Stompin' at the Savoy	Bill	Television film
1992, 1995, 1996	Murder, She Wrote	Various roles	3 episodes
1993	Reasonable Doubts	Grandalski	Episode: "Two Women"
1993–95	SeaQuest DSV	Benjamin Krieg	24 episodes
1994	M.A.N.T.I.S.	Agent Raymond Geary	Episode: "To Prey in Darkness"
1995	Baywatch	Jack Klein	Episode: "Face of Fear"
1995	Renegade	Tony Spano	Episode: "Another Place and Time"
1996	The Babysitter's Seduction	Paul Richards	Television film
1996	Seinfeld	Todd Gack	Episode: "The Calzone"
1996	3rd Rock from the Sun	Mr. Randell	4 episodes
1996	Lois & Clark: The New Adventures of Superman	Young Conner Schenk	Episode: "Brutal Youth"
1997	Crisis Center	Asst D.A. John Romano	Episode: "Where Truth Lies"
1997	Xena: Warrior Princess	Ulysses	Episode: "Ulysses"
1997	Pensacola: Wings of Gold	Voight	Episode: "Birds of Prey"
1997	Alright Already	Ned	Episode: "Again with the Lobbyist"
1997	Silk Stalkings	Tony DeFalco	Episode: "The Wedge"
1998	Sliders	Randall Simmons	Episode: "Virtual Slide"
1998	Martial Law	George Young	Episode: "Take Out"
1998	Hard Time	Ray Hertz	Television film
1999	Melrose Place	Perry Hutchins	2 episodes
1999	V.I.P.	Eric Collier	Episode: "Good Val Hunting"
2000–05	JAG	Stuart Dunston	11 episodes
2001	That's My Bush!	Larry O'Shea	8 episodes
2003	Oliver Beene	Bernard Vogel	Episode: "A Day at the Beach"
2003	The Division	Dr. James Turner	Episode: "Body Double"
2004	Crossing Jordan	Harold Fallon	Episode: "Revealed"
2005	Inconceivable	Hal Vanucci	Episode: "To Surrogate, with Love"
2007	Eyes	Ed Kearney	Episode: "Innocence"
2007	Hannah Montana	President Richard Martinez	Episode: "Take This Job and Love It"
2007	Weeds	Mr. Tramigliosi	Episode: "Doing the Backstroke"
2007	Shark	Ty Bennings	Episode: "Shaun of the Dead"
2007–08	Cory in the House	President Richard Martinez	34 episodes
2008	Monk	McKiernan	Episode: "Mr. Monk Falls in Love"
2009	CSI: Crime Scene Investigation	Gavin Fenish	Episode: "Turn, Turn, Turn"
2009	Serving Time	Paparazzo	Episode: "Pilot"
2010	Cold Case	Kenneth Hoag	Episode: "Bullet"
2011	Shake It Up	Don Rio	Episode: "Glitz It Up"
2013	Dexter	Ed Hamilton	2 episodes
2013	Major Crimes	Craig Fowler	Episode: "Curve Ball"
2015	The Mentalist	Bill Herman	Episode: "Brown Shag Carpet"
2015	NCIS	Ken Ashmore	Episode: "Lost in Translation"
2017	In Sanity, Florida	Harris Smith	4 episodes
2018	Disjointed	Heckler	Episode: "Dr. Dankerson's Revivifying Wellness Tincture"
2018	K.C. Undercover	Joey Damico	Episode: "Take Me Out"
2018	Here and Now	Governor Eric Baugher	Episode: "Wake"
2018	A.P. Bio	Dean Warren Richardson	Episode: "Drenching Dallas"
2021	S.W.A.T.	Afton	Episode: "Sins of the Fathers"
2021	Most Wanted Santa	Gabriel	Television film
2022	Progeny: Camp Pathway	Payton's Father	Television film
