= Breathing Happy =

Upcoming American film by Shane Brady

- Directed by: Shane Brady
- Written by: Shane Brady
- Produced by: David Lawson Jr.
- Starring: John D'Aquino; Augie Duke; June Carryl; Phil Esposito; Katelyn Nacon; Jim O'Heir; Aaron Moorhead; Justin Benson; Sarah Bolger
- Music by: Christopher Dudley
- Production companies: Rustic Films & Scatter Brothers Productions
- Release date: June 2022 (Chattanooga)
- Running time: 97 minutes
- Country: United States
- Language: English
- Budget: $20,000

Breathing Happy is a 2022 American drama film written and directed by Shane Brady in his feature directorial debut.

== Premise ==
Dylan is a recovering drug addict about to celebrate his first year of sobriety on Christmas.

== Cast ==
- Shane Brady
- John D'Aquino
- Augie Duke
- June Carryl
- Phil Esposito
- Katelyn Nacon
- Jim O'Heir
- Aaron Moorhead
- Justin Benson
- Sarah Bolger
- Owen Atlas
- Sarah Noelle Eastep

== Production ==
The drama film Breathing Happy was announced on April 16, 2021, when filming began around Tampa, Florida and Los Angeles, California. Due to the COVID-19 pandemic, principal photography was moved from L.A. to Florida, where filming took place mainly in the childhood house of writer and director Shane Brady, located in Palm Harbor, Florida. As a result, various locations in the screenplay were removed and the script was rewritten to model the house.

In creating the film, Brady said that he "didn't want to tell a literal story of addiction, with a logical, linear flow because when it comes to drugs, nothing makes sense." He also described his time as a magician, and how it helped him "tell this story in a way no one else could", and explained that the film was his "artistic interpretation of my family's struggles with addiction" as a "jumbled popcorn machine of emotions and points of view hopefully bringing about healing for other families struggling with addiction."

During post-production, the film score was composed by Christopher Dudley from the American rock band Underoath.

== Release ==
The film was set to premiere at the Chattanooga Film Festival in June 2022.
