= Trauma Is a Time Machine =

Trauma is a Time Machine
- Directed by: Angelica Zollo
- Written by: Angelica Zollo
- Produced by: Derek Shane Garcia; Michael Reilly; Barrett Rouen; Angelica Zollo
- Starring: Augie Duke; Gabe Fazio
- Cinematography: Eric Giovon
- Edited by: Thomas M. Vogt
- Music by: Brian Lapin; Karl Mullarky
- Production company: Constantly Curious Productions
- Distributed by: Vertical Entertainment
- Release dates: 6 June 2018 (Art of Brooklyn Film Festival); 20 September 2019 (US)
- Running time: 82 minutes
- Country: United States
- Language: English

Trauma is a Time Machine is a 2018 American drama film directed by Angelica Zollo, starring Augie Duke and Gabe Fazio.

== Cast ==
- Augie Duke as Helen
- Gabe Fazio as Toby
- Elizabeth A. Davis as Georgia
- Robyn Peterson as Woman at the Bus Stop
- Ella Loudon as Joan
- Max Duane as Man One
- Joseph Reiver as Man Two
- Karl Scully as Karl

== Release ==
The film was released on 20 September 2019.

== Reception ==
Katie Walsh of the Los Angeles Times wrote that while the narrative was lacking in "structural integrity", Zollo and Duke "create a courageously personal, experimental piece, tapping into a raw emotional state not often rendered on screen with such depth and intelligence."

Frank Scheck of The Hollywood Reporter wrote that while Duke "delivers a shattering, highly physical performance that fully conveys her character’s complex mixture of anger, depression and disorientation", she is "unable to overcome the film’s inertia and repetitiveness, its vague proceedings stretched out interminably to reach a feature-length running time".
