= Fucktoys =

- Promotional poster
- Directed by: Annapurna Sriram
- Written by: Annapurna Sriram
- Produced by: Timothy Petryni
- Starring: Annapurna Sriram; Sadie Scott; Damian Young; Brandon Flynn; François Arnaud; Big Freedia
- Cinematography: Cory Fraiman-Lott
- Edited by: Lilly Wild; Grason Caldwell
- Music by: Jake Orrall
- Production companies: Trashtown Pictures; Atypical Day
- Release dates: March 9, 2025 (SXSW); May 29, 2026 (United States)
- Running time: 106 minutes
- Country: United States
- Language: English

Fucktoys is a 2025 American absurdist black comedy-drama film written and directed by Annapurna Sriram in her feature filmmaking debut. The film stars Sriram, Sadie Scott, François Arnaud, Big Freedia, Damian Young, and Brandon Flynn.

The film premiered at the South By Southwest Film Festival on March 9, 2025, where it received the Special Jury Award in Narrative Feature Competition.

== Premise ==
After learning she can lift a curse for a payment of $1,000 and the sacrifice of a baby lamb, sex worker and ingénue AP sets out via moped across the pre-millennium alternate reality city of Trashtown, USA to try and earn enough money for the ceremony. Throughout her journey she encounters a series of bizarre, larger-than-life characters that force her to navigate the pervasively transactional reality of her world. Sriram describes the film as "neo-camp" and American New Wave revival. The film's journey through the night structure has been compared to films like After Hours and Good Time, and its visual iconography inspired by the tarot, based on the Fool's journey through the Major Arcana.

== Cast ==
- Annapurna Sriram as AP
- Sadie Scott as Danni
- Damian Young as Robert
- Brandon Flynn as James Francone
- François Arnaud as The Mechanic
- Big Freedia as Tarot Woman
- Marcus Anderson Jr. as The Caterer
- Jowin Marie Batoon as Neon Psychic
- Stevie Cavalier as Brooks
- Todd d'Amour as Negotiator John
- Nikki Dixon as Lisa
- Ellen Harvey as Helena
- Denton Hatcher as Insecure John
- Dan A.R. Kelly as Joe Schmo
- Tamika Lawrence as Dion
- Audrey Medrano as Flea Market Psychic
- Casey Mills as Swingset
- Lorrie Odom as High Priestess Psychic
- Arianna Ortiz as Luna
- Matt Owens as Conspiracy Theorist John
- Don Stephenson as Clause
- Tone Tank as Conrad
- Tam Taylor as Lucy
- Olivia Troy as Hotel Receptionist
- Creek Wilson as The Truck Driver

== Production ==
Sriram's inspiration for the style of the film includes films such as Angel and Ken Russell's Crimes of Passion, and the works of John Waters, Gregg Araki, and Agnès Varda. The film was shot on super 16mm and Hawk anamorphic lenses. The film was inspired by a previous relationship of Sriram, with her stating: "I had this breakup happen in my late 20s, and it was because a psychic told me that if I didn't dump my boyfriend, I was going to get really sick and wasn't going to have the career I was supposed to have. So I called him and said, ‘OK, the psychic says we have to break up.’ I got off the phone and felt like an insane person, because who has a call with a psychic who's like, ‘Do this life-changing thing,’ and then you immediately do it? So I felt very gullible and naive. I was heartbroken, and I started writing scenes." The film's title was described as means to reclaiming the term for women, or as Sriram explains, "to reclaim that language and make it our own, something that is playful, that is positive, that becomes a way of dismantling this patriarchal or oppressive culture. In the spirit of that tradition, we felt that it was important, especially in the fascist era that we're in right now, to not censor ourselves, to actually take a stand and fight back against slut-shaming, whorephobia, and misogyny generally. Fucktoys is a positive [term] in the same way that we “serve cunt” or we're like, “yes bitch,” all of these terms that were supposed to tear us down and are now forms of building community."

The film was shot on location in Louisiana.

== Release ==
The film's poster was illustrated by Canadian artist Suspiria Vilchez, and a festival teaser for the film was released on March 6, 2025.

The film premiered at the 2025 South by Southwest Film & TV Festival, where it won the Special Jury Award for a Multi-Hyphenate. During its festival run the film played and won awards at dozens of major film festivals including SIFF, Frameline, Karlovy Vary, Fantasia, Oldenburg, BFI London, Sitges, AFI Fest, Torino, and BIFAN. Fucktoys also won the Grand Jury Award at NewFest in New York, and earned Sriram a 2026 Film Independent Spirit Award nomination.

== Reception ==
On review aggregator Rotten Tomatoes, the film holds an approval rating of 97% based on 33 reviews.

== Accolades ==
| Year | Award | Category | Recipient(s) | Result | Ref |
|---|---|---|---|---|---|
| 2025 | Fantasia International Film Festival | New Flesh Competition: Special Jury Mentions | Annapurna Sriram | Won | |
| 2025 | New York Lesbian, Gay, Bisexual, & Transgender Film Festival | U.S. Narrative Feature Jury Award | Fucktoys | Grand Jury Prize | |
| 2025 | South by Southwest | Special Jury Award for a Multi-Hyphenate | Annapurna Sriram | Won | |
| 2025 | Vancouver International Film Festival | Audience Award, Altered States | Fucktoys | Won | |
| 2025 | San Diego Asian Film Festival | Grand Jury Prize | Fucktoys | Won | |
| 2026 | Film Independent Spirit Awards | Someone to Watch Award | Annapurna Sriram | Nominated | |
