= She's in Portland =

- Film poster
- Directed by: Marc Carlini
- Written by: Marc Carlini; Patrick Alexander
- Produced by: Jeremy Alter; Marc Carlini; Patrick Alexander; Greg O'Bryant; T. Justin Ross; Oren Skoog
- Starring: Tommy Dewey; François Arnaud; Minka Kelly
- Cinematography: Devin Whetstone
- Edited by: Marc Carlini; Greg O'Bryant
- Music by: Mondo Boys
- Production companies: Slater Brothers Entertainment; Son of the Knife Films; Tilt/Shift Films
- Distributed by: Freestyle Releasing
- Release dates: January 16, 2020 (SBIFF); September 25, 2020 (United States)
- Running time: 101 minutes
- Country: United States
- Language: English

She's in Portland is a 2020 American comedy drama film directed by Marc Carlini and written by Carlini and Patrick Alexander. It stars Tommy Dewey, François Arnaud and Minka Kelly.

She's in Portland had its world premiere at the Santa Barbara International Film Festival on January 16, 2020. It was released on September 25, 2020, on digital and on demand.

== Plot ==
Two college friends, now in their thirties, admire each other's lives and feel trapped in their own. Wes, tied to a demanding career and responsibilities to family, extends a work trip to drag his dispirited artist friend Luke to find Luke's "one that got away".

== Cast ==
- Tommy Dewey as Wes
- Paige Spara as Mallory
- François Arnaud as Luke
- Minka Kelly as Sarah Hill
- Joelle Carter as Rebecca
- Lola Glaudini as Ellen
- Samba Schutte as Steve

== Soundtrack ==
The score soundtrack album of the film was composed by Mondo Boys. It was released on October 9, 2020.

== Reception ==
Rotten Tomatoes gives the film a 67% approval rating based on 15 reviews, with an average rating of 6.2/10.
