= Matthew Brumlow =

American actor

- Occupation: Actor
- Years active: 2001–present
- Spouse: Cora Vander Broek

Matthew Brumlow is an American stage actor based in Chicago, Illinois. Brumlow has been a member of the American Blues Theater since 2001. He has twice been nominated for an Equity Jeff Award for his work as an actor in Chicago. He also starred in a one-man show about the life of Hank Williams Sr. entitled, "Nobody Lonesome for Me." In March 2011, Brumlow was named one of the "50 most beautiful Chicagoans" by Chicago Magazine.

Feature films include "Endings" and "Where We Started." Both films were directed by Chris Hansen (Theoretical Entertainment).

Brumlow graduated summa cum laude from Lee University in 1996, winning the F.J. Lee Award given by the faculty to the Lee University senior considered to be the most outstanding student. He served as the 36th President of Upsilon Xi. Brumlow also holds a master's degree from Northwestern University.
