= Above the Shadows =

2019 film

- Theatrical release poster
- Directed by: Claudia Myers
- Written by: Claudia Myers
- Produced by: Mark Schacknies; Tara Sickmeier; Rob Baunoch III; Khris Baxter
- Starring: Olivia Thirlby; Alan Ritchson; Jim Gaffigan; Maria Dizzia; Tito Ortiz; David Johansen; Megan Fox
- Cinematography: Eric Robbins
- Edited by: Kathryn J. Schubert
- Music by: Kaki King
- Production companies: HIPZEE; Myriad Pictures; Boundary Stone Films
- Distributed by: Gravitas Ventures
- Release dates: May 31, 2019 (BFF); July 19, 2019 (United States)
- Running time: 105 minutes
- Country: United States
- Language: English
- Box office: $1,594

Above the Shadows is a 2019 supernatural romance film written and directed by Claudia Myers. The film stars Olivia Thirlby, Alan Ritchson, Jim Gaffigan, Maria Dizzia, Tito Ortiz, David Johansen in his final feature film and Megan Fox.

It had its world premiere at the Brooklyn Film Festival on May 31, 2019, and was released to video on demand and select theaters on July 19, 2019, by Gravitas Ventures.

== Plot ==
Holly (Olivia Thirlby) was once a happy child, but after the death of her mother, she gradually became invisible—first emotionally, then physically—to everyone around her, including her own family. As she grew older, her presence completely faded, leaving her alone in a world where no one could see or acknowledge her existence. Over time, she adapted to her isolation, using her invisibility to her advantage by working as a paparazzo. She sneaks into celebrity hotspots, capturing scandalous photos and selling them to tabloids, finding a strange sense of purpose in exposing the lives of others.

One night, while taking photos in a nightclub, Holly is stunned to realize that a man—Shayne Blackwell (Alan Ritchson), a former MMA fighter—can see her. Shayne had been a rising star in the fighting world but fell from grace after being caught in a compromising photograph with another woman, which led to the breakdown of his relationship with Juliana (Megan Fox) and the loss of his career. Holly soon realizes, to her horror, that she was the one who took and leaked the photo that destroyed his life.

Wracked with guilt, Holly follows Shayne and learns that he is now working as a bouncer at the same nightclub where she found him. Desperate to make amends, she approaches him and offers to help him reclaim his career. Though initially skeptical, Shayne accepts her assistance when she proves herself useful in his training and in navigating the brutal world of professional fighting. As they work together, Holly encourages him to push himself back into the spotlight, helping him regain his confidence and find new fight opportunities.

As Shayne progresses, he and Holly grow close, forming a deep bond built on trust and mutual support. For the first time in years, Holly feels seen—not just physically, but emotionally. At the same time, she begins to notice subtle changes in her condition: the more she connects with Shayne, the more she seems to regain her presence in the world.

However, complications arise when Juliana re-enters Shayne’s life, drawn by his comeback. Holly realizes that Shayne still has a lingering desire to reclaim his old life in its entirety, including Juliana. Shayne and Holly part on bad terms, and Holly wakes up to find herself invisible to Shayne as well as herself.

Holly is forced to confront the emotional wounds that led to her invisibility in the first place. She returns to her childhood home and faces her estranged father and siblings, who have no memory of her. She begins to realize that the grief of her mothers’s loss affected the rest of her family as well. She finally acknowledges that her isolation was a self-imposed defense mechanism against pain and rejection.

Holly rushes to Shayne’s fight, and as the two reconcile her presence is fully restored. Shayne loses the fight, but runs after Holly and professes his love for her. The film ends as Holly embraces her dad.

== Cast ==
- Olivia Thirlby as Holly
  - Fina Strazza as Young Holly
- Alan Ritchson as Shayne
- Jim Gaffigan as Paul Jederman
- Maria Dizzia as Victoria Jederman
- Tito Ortiz as Attila
- David Johansen as Ron
- Megan Fox as Juliana
- Justine Cotsonas as Vanessa
  - Lauren Hartman as Young Vanessa
- Owen Campbell as Troy
  - Alex Gemeinhardt as Young Troy
- Pawel Szajda as Marjus
- Patricia Pinto as Dancer
- Taylor Selé as Tommy Bones
- Thomas Canestraro as Carlos Suarez
- Kareem Savinon as Brandon
- R. Marcos Taylor as Khan
- Laura Heywood as Reporter #2

== Production ==
The film is based on an original script written by director Claudia Myers. On November 1, 2017, it was announced that Olivia Thirlby, Alan Ritchson, Jim Gaffigan and Megan Fox were set to star in the film, which, at the time, was named Shadow Girl. Above the Shadows was produced by Tony Award-nominated company, HIPZEE, in association with Myriad Pictures, Boundary Stone Films and BondIt Media Capital.

== Release ==
Above the Shadows premiered at the 22nd Brooklyn Film Festival (BFF) on May 31, 2019. It won the BFF Audience Choice Award for Narrative Feature. In May 2019, Gravitas Ventures acquired U.S. distribution rights to the film and set it for a July 19, 2019 release.

== Reception ==
On Rotten Tomatoes, the film has an approval rating of 70% based on reviews from 10 critics.

Courtney Howard of Variety wrote: "This magical-realist fairy tale, about a young woman feeling so isolated and insignificant after a tragic loss that she's literally invisible to everyone except one other struggling soul, is certainly imaginative and intelligent in its ideas. However, the savvy smarts within don't quite sustain the running time and, much like its protagonist, the film becomes transparent in its motives and sentimentality."

John DeFore of The Hollywood Reporter wrote: "Though it may be amusing to watch Holly sneak around and expose others' lies, it would be much more fun if her own story rang true."

Noel Murray of the Los Angeles Times wrote: "Thirlby gives a good performance as someone who finds it easier to remain a non-person than to make any effort to fix her life. But the more Holly comes into view, the blander her character becomes."
