= Cora Vander Broek =

American actress

Personal details
- Spouse: Matthew Brumlow
- Education: Northwestern College (BA)
- Occupation: actress

Cora Vander Broek is an American actress. She was nominated for a Tony Award for Best Featured Actress in a Play in 2020 for her Broadway-debut performance as Jules in Linda Vista by Tracy Letts.

She has appeared on television in Grace and Frankie, Chicago Fire, and Law & Order: SVU.

== Life and career ==
Cora F. Vander Broek was born in Orange City, Iowa, to Diane (Vander Stoep) and Thomas Vander Broek. She has a sister, Renee, and two brothers, Caleb and Michael. Her parents worked for Mission Aviation Fellowship and she spent her early years living with her parents in Indonesia and Honduras, before they returned to Iowa. She graduated with a BA in Theatre from Northwestern College.

After college, she moved to Chicago and studied at The School at Steppenwolf (Steppenwolf Theatre). Select Chicago theatre credits include: Steppenwolf Theatre; Goodman Theatre; TimeLine Theatre; Raven theatre. Select regional theatre credits include: Actors Theatre at Louisville; Milwaukee Repertory Theatre; Indiana Repertory Theatre; Montana Shakespeare in the Parks. Cora is a Joseph Jefferson Award nominee and has been named an “Actor to Watch” by the Chicago Tribune.

Vander Broek made her Broadway debut as “Jules” in the World Premiere of Pulitzer and Tony Award winner Tracy Letts’ new play, Linda Vista, for which she received a 2020 Tony Nomination for “Actress in a Featured Role" as well as an Ovation Award nomination. She originated the role for Steppenwolf Theatre in Chicago and went on to reprise the role at the Mark Taper Forum in Los Angeles and finally at the Hayes Theater on Broadway.

She currently lives in Los Angeles where she also writes and produces.
