= Claudia Myers =

American screenwriter, director and producer

- Born: New Haven, Connecticut, United States
- Occupations: Screenwriter, director, producer
- Years active: 1997–present

Claudia Myers is an American screenwriter, director and producer. In addition, she is an associate professor of Film and Media at American University's School of Communication.

== Early life ==
Myers received an M.F.A from Columbia University's School of the Arts and a BA from Yale University.

== Career ==
=== Buddy & Grace ===
In 2001, she co-wrote and directed the film Buddy & Grace. The romantic drama tells the story of an elderly man struggling with his wife who suffers with Alzheimer's. The film was screened at several festivals including Sundance Film Festival and Los Angeles International Film Festival. It also won the Student Grant Award as part of the National Board of Review.

=== Kettle of Fish ===
Myers wrote and directed the film Kettle of Fish in 2006. A romantic comedy of a womanizing and commitment-phobic saxophonist (Matthew Modine) in co-habitation with a research biologist (Gina Gershon). The film was a part of the Tribeca Film Festival in 2006.

=== Fort Bliss ===
In 2014 Myers wrote and directed the film Fort Bliss. Fort Bliss is a film about an army medic and single mother Maggie Swann (portrayed by Michelle Monaghan) struggling to readjust to life with her family after a tour in Afghanistan. The film won the Audience Award at the 2014 Champs-Élysées Film Festival. After the release, Independent Magazine named Myers one of the '10 Filmmakers to Watch in 2015'.

=== Above the Shadows ===
Myers went on to write and direct the 2019 film Above the Shadows. The film is about a young woman (Olivia Thirlby) who has faded to the point of becoming invisible and must find her way back with the help of the one man who can see her.

== Filmography ==
Year	Title	Role	Genre
1999	Short Cut (Short)	Director	Comedy
2001	Buddy & Grace (Short)	Co-Writer, Director	Drama
2004	Anatomy of Care (Video)	Co-Writer	Drama
2004	The Kindness of Strangers (Short)	Writer, director	Drama
2006	Kettle of Fish	Writer, director	Romantic Comedy
2007	Outside the Wire (Video)	Writer, director	Interactive Feature
2009	The Long Road Back	Writer, producer	Documentary
2010	The War Inside	Co-Writer	Drama
2010	Below the Beltway	Producer	Drama
2010	Women at War	Writer, producer	Documentary
2012	Women on the Wing	Writer, producer	Documentary
2014	Fort Bliss	Writer, director	Drama
2016	Wild Oats	Co-Writer	Comedy
2019	Above the Shadows	Writer, director	Supernatural romance
2024	The Bad Guardian	Director	Drama
