= Olivia Thirlby =

American actress (born 1986)

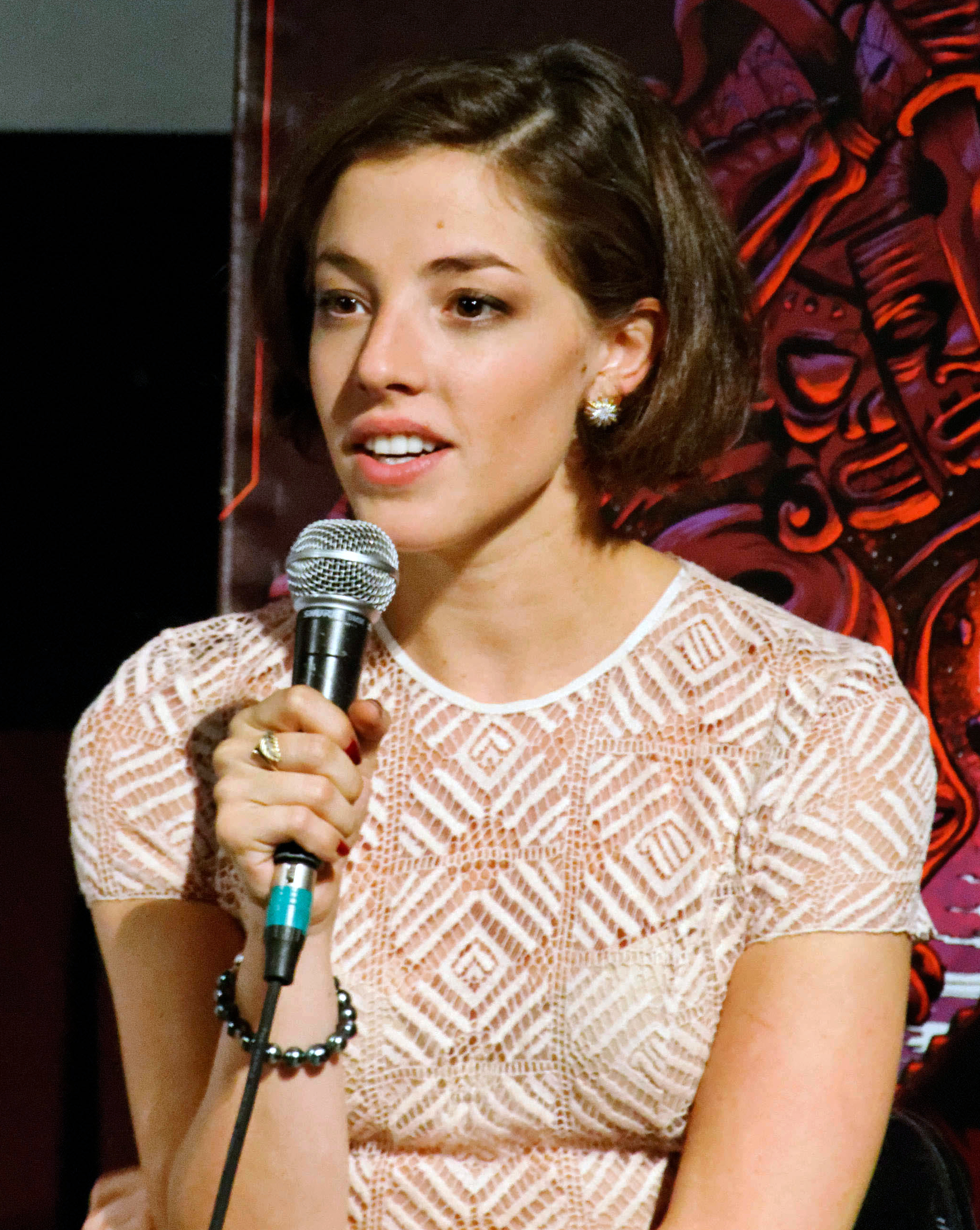
- Thirlby in 2012
- Born: Olivia Jo Thirlby; October 6, 1986 (age 40); New York City, U.S.
- Occupation: Actress
- Years active: 2006–present
- Spouse: Jacques Pienaar (m. 2014; sep. 2021)

Olivia Jo Thirlby (born October 6, 1986) is an American actress. She is best known for her roles as Leah in the comedy-drama film Juno (2007), as Natalie in The Darkest Hour (2011) and as Judge Cassandra Anderson in Dredd (2012). In 2023, Thirlby portrayed Lilli Hornig in Christopher Nolan's biographical film Oppenheimer.

== Early life ==
Thirlby was born on October 6, 1986, in New York City, to an advertising executive mother and a contractor father. She was raised in Manhattan's East Village, attending school at Friends Seminary in the city's Gramercy neighborhood, where she graduated in a class of 57 students. She also attended French Woods Festival of the Performing Arts in upstate New York, and Usdan Center for the Creative and Performing Arts. She took classes at the American Globe Theatre, and briefly at the Royal Academy of Dramatic Art in London where she completed a stage combat course with the British Academy of Stage and Screen Combat (BASSC).

== Career ==
While in high school, Thirlby had a role in The Secret. In 2006, she made her film debut in United 93 and her television debut in Kidnapped.

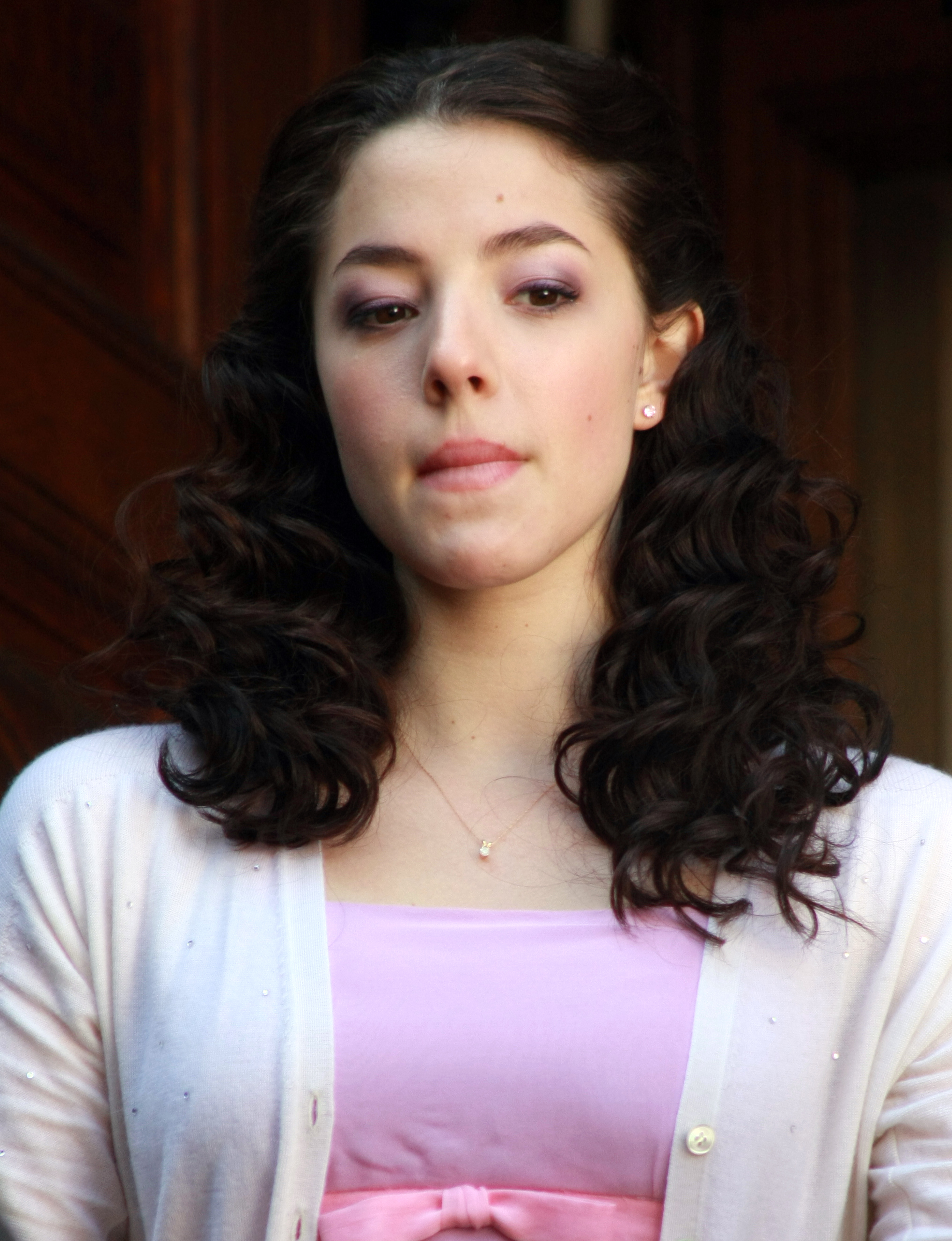
Olivia Thirlby on set while shooting New York, I Love You on the Upper West Side of New York City on March 24, 2008

In 2007, she played Leah in Juno. Around this time, she and her Juno co-star Elliot Page were slated to star as the respective title characters of Jack & Diane as two young women who fall in love which unlocked lycanthropy in one character but both dropped out before production, and the cast was replaced numerous times over. She plays Stephanie, a marijuana-smoking "popular girl" from New York City, in Sundance Audience Award-winning mid-1990s period piece film The Wackness, which was released in the U.S. on July 3, 2008, and stars opposite Josh Peck. Thirlby was cast in the Judd Apatow-produced, David Gordon Green-directed stoner comedy Pineapple Express as the girlfriend of Seth Rogen's character, but was replaced by Amber Heard after rehearsing for the film. She reunited with David Gordon Green on the animated TV pilot Good Vibes.

She made her stage debut in Farragut North, a play by Beau Willimon at the Atlantic Theater Company in New York City. The Off-Broadway production ran from October 22, 2008 – November 29, 2008 with official opening on November 12 and transferred to the Geffen Playhouse in June 2009.

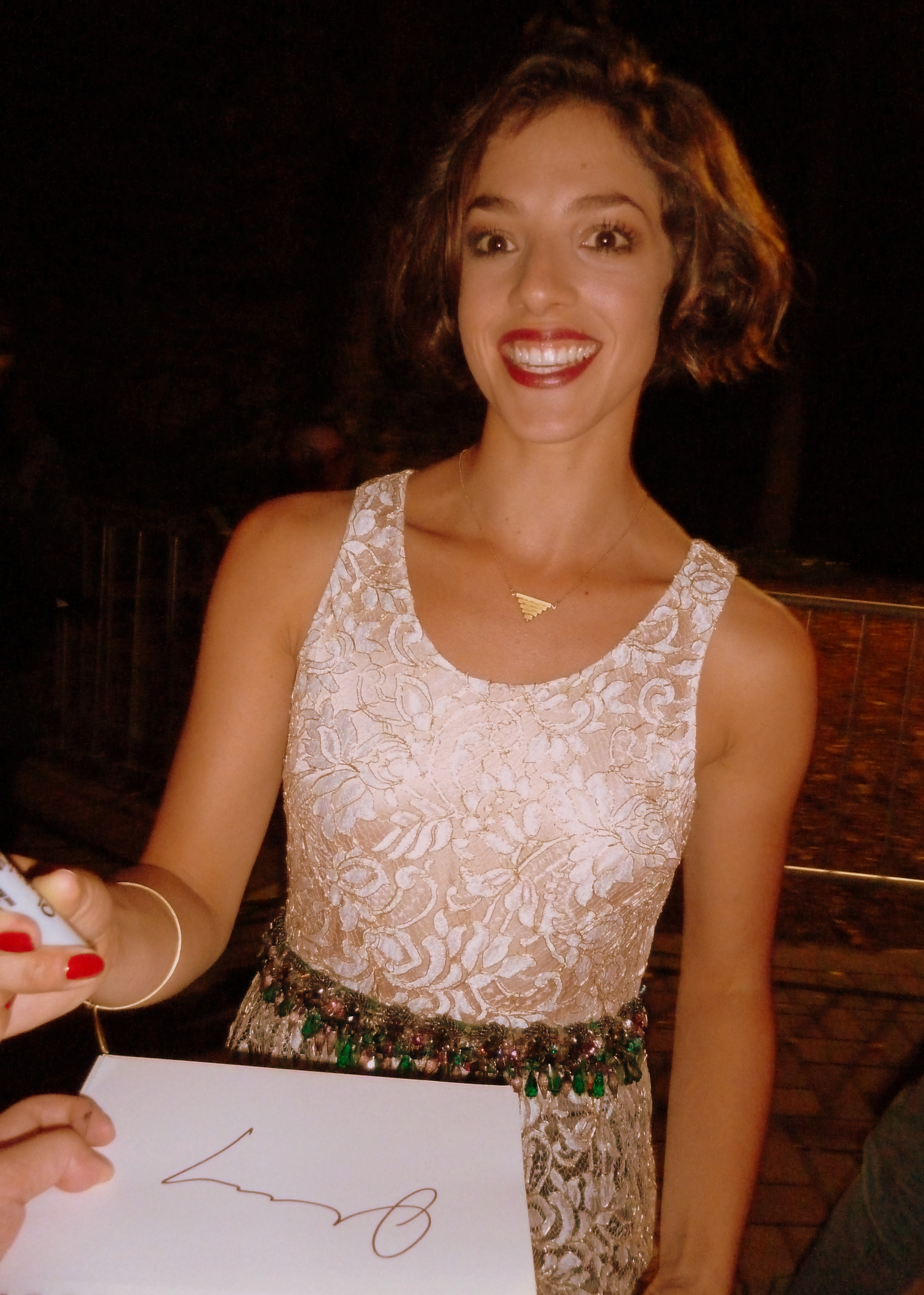
Olivia Thirlby at the premiere of Dredd, during the 2012 Toronto International Film Festival

Thirlby appeared in the 2009 HBO series Bored to Death. She voices promotional video excerpts from the novel Thirteen Reasons Why by Jay Asher which, since October 2008, have regularly been posted to YouTube. She also appeared in the 2011-released film Margaret. She was attached to star in Christmas in New York, though the film was not made, as well as For Ellen, where it appears she did not accept a role.

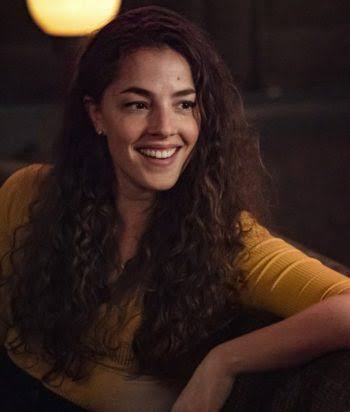
Olivia Thirlby in March 2020

Thirlby starred in the Russian science-fiction film The Darkest Hour, released in 2011, directed by Chris Gorak, and produced by Timur Bekmambetov.

Thirlby starred as Judge Cassandra Anderson in the 2012 film adaptation of Judge Dredd, with Karl Urban in the title role. She next starred in the indie film Nobody Walks co-starring John Krasinski and Rosemarie DeWitt. She plays Martine, a young artist taken in a couple's home. It premiered at 2012 Sundance Film Festival. In 2016, Thirlby co-starred as the young attorney Lucy Kittridge in the Amazon Studios legal series Goliath. 2017 saw her play a main character in the thriller Damascus Cover. In 2018 she took the lead in The White Orchid. She also portrayed the main character in 2019's Above the Shadows. Thirlby featured as MCC minister Rebecca Dowery in the 2019 Showtime drama series The L Word: Generation Q. She was Hero Brown, a main character in 2021's Y: The Last Man.

== Personal life ==
In an interview with Brooklyn Magazine in 2011, Thirlby said she was bisexual. That same year Thirlby agreed to participate in iO Tillett Wright's Self-Evident Truths Project, an effort to capture the diversity of the LGBTQ+ community in the United States through photography.

She married Jacques Pienaar on December 28, 2014; she met him on the set of her 2012 film Dredd. Pienaar filed for divorce in March 2021.

In 2023, Elliot Page stated that the two were involved in a relationship while filming Juno.

== Filmography ==
=== Film ===
Year	Title	Role	Notes
2006	United 93	Nicole Carol Miller	
2007	Snow Angels	Lila Raybern	
2007	Juno	Leah	
2007	Love Comes Lately	Sylvia Brokeles	
2007	The Secret	Samantha Marris	
2008	The Wackness	Stephanie Squires	
2008	New York, I Love You	Actress	Segment: "Brett Ratner"
2009	The Answer Man	Anne	
2009	Uncertainty	Sophie Montero	
2009	Breaking Upwards	Erika	
2009	What Goes Up	Tess Sullivan	
2009	Solitary Man	Maureen	Uncredited
2011	No Strings Attached	Katie Kurtzman	
2011	Margaret	Monica Sloane	
2011	The Darkest Hour	Natalie	
2012	Nobody Walks	Martine	
2012	Being Flynn	Denise	
2012	Dredd	Judge Cassandra Anderson	
2014	Red Knot	Chloe Harrison	
2014	5 to 7	Jane Hastings	
2014	Just Before I Go	Greta	
2015	The Wedding Ringer	Alison Palmer	
2015	The Stanford Prison Experiment	Christina Maslach	
2015	Welcome to Happiness	Trudy	
2016	Between Us	Dianne	
2017	Chappaquiddick	Rachel Schiff	
2018	Damascus Cover	Kim Johnson	
2018	The White Orchid	Claire Decker	Associate producer
2019	Above the Shadows	Holly	
2023	Oppenheimer	Lilli Hornig	
2023	Dumb Money	Yaara Plotkin	
2023	Lousy Carter	Candela	
2026	Ghost Soldier †	TBA	Post-production

=== Television ===
Year	Title	Role	Notes
2006–2007	Kidnapped	Aubrey Cain	5 episodes
2009	Bored to Death	Suzanne	4 episodes
2011	Good Vibes	Jeena	12 episodes; Voice role
2016	Goliath	Lucy Kittridge	8 episodes
2019–2020	The L Word: Generation Q	Rebecca Dowery	5 episodes
2021	Y: The Last Man	Hero Brown	10 episodes
2025	Law & Order: Organized Crime	Detective Frances Tanner	4 episodes
2026	Wonder Man	Vivian	3 episodes
2026–present	Fire Country	Cecilia Jade “CJ” Ryan	13 episodes

== Theater ==
Year	Title	Role	Notes
2008	Farragut North	Molly Stearns	Linda Gross Theater
2012	Lonely, I'm Not	Businesswoman	Second Stage Theatre
2014	O.P.C.	Romi Weil	American Repertory Theater
