= Out on Film =

Annual LGBTQ+ film festival in the US

Out On Film
- Location: Midtown, Atlanta, Georgia, U.S.
- Founded: 1987
- Awards received: USA Today 10Best #1 Film Festival (2023)
- Hosted by: Out On Film, Inc. Executive Director: Justice Obiaya
- Artistic director: Jim Farmer
- Website: www.outonfilm.org

Out On Film is an annual LGBTQ+ film festival held in Atlanta, Georgia. Established in 1987, it is one of the oldest and largest LGBTQIA+ film festivals in the United States. The festival takes place primarily in Midtown Atlanta in late September and early October, with additional screenings and community events held throughout the year.

The festival is operated as a 501(c)(3) non-profit organization. Its stated mission is to inform, entertain, educate, and enrich LGBTQ+ culture by showcasing films by, for, and about the LGBTQ+ community and its allies.

== Programming ==
Out On Film features a diverse lineup of independent cinema, including feature-length dramas, comedies, foreign language films, documentaries, and short films.

In its early decades, the festival established a profile for hosting regional and world premieres, including Rivers Wash Over Me in 2009 and Fishnet in 2010. The festival expanded significantly in the 2020s, incorporating a hybrid virtual screening model and expanding its competitive accolades to include screenplay competitions and industry panels via its annual Queer Film Summit. In 2024, Justice Obiaya assumed the role of Executive Director, becoming the first person in the organization's history to hold the position and subsequently leading the festival to record box office and attendance turnouts alongside longtime Festival Director Jim Farmer.

== Funding and venues ==
As a non-profit cultural event, the festival relies on corporate sponsorships, individual ticket sales, and government or arts grants, including funding from the National Endowment for the Arts. Primary screening venues include the Landmark Midtown Art Cinema and the Out Front Theatre Company.

== Festival dates ==
Year	Dates
2006	November 10–16
2007	October 11–17
2008	April 11–17
2009	May 28–31
2009	October 2–8
2010	October 1–7
2011	September 29 – October 6
2012	October 4–11
2013	October 3–10
2014	October 2–9
2015	October 1–8
2016	September 29 – October 6
2017	September 28 – October 8
2018	September 27 – October 7
2019	September 26 – October 6
2020	September 24 – October 4
2021	September 23 – October 3
2022	September 22 – October 2
2023	September 21 – October 1
2024	September 26 – October 6
2025	September 25 – October 5
2026	September 24 – October 4

Note: Historical dates from 1987 to 2005 are documented in festival archives.

== Awards and recognition ==
- BAFTA Qualifying Festival: Designated as an official qualifying festival for the British Academy Film Awards in 2024.
- USA Today 10Best: Voted the No. 1 Best Film Festival in the United States by USA Today reader polls in 2023, maintaining high placements on the national list in subsequent years.
- Academy Awards Qualifying Status: Received Oscar-qualifying designation from the Academy of Motion Picture Arts and Sciences in 2020, making its Best Drama Short film winners eligible for Academy Award consideration. It was one of only two LGBTQ+ film festivals in the United States to achieve this status at the time.
- Community Awards: Festival Director Jim Farmer was named "Businessman of the Year" (2019) and the organization received the "Pivot of the Year" award (2020) from the OUT Georgia Business Alliance.

== See also ==
- List of film festivals in North and Central America
- Atlanta Pride
- List of LGBTQ film festivals
- Midtown Atlanta
