= The Legend of Zelda (film) =

Upcoming film by Wes Ball

- Logo as revealed in a Nintendo Direct presentation
- Directed by: Wes Ball
- Screenplay by: T. S. Nowlin
- Based on: The Legend of Zelda by Nintendo (Note: The Legend of Zelda (1986) was developed by Nintendo R&D4, published by Nintendo, directed by Shigeru Miyamoto and Takashi Tezuka, written by Tezuka and Keiji Terui, produced by Miyamoto, and designed by Miyamoto and Tezuka.)
- Produced by: Shigeru Miyamoto; Avi Arad; Wes Ball; Joe Hartwick Jr.
- Starring: Benjamin Evan Ainsworth; Bo Bragason; Uli Latukefu; Dichen Lachman; Yvonne Strahovski; Lydia Peckham; Sam Neill
- Cinematography: Gyula Pados
- Production companies: Columbia Pictures; Nintendo; OddBall Entertainment
- Distributed by: Sony Pictures Releasing
- Release date: April 30, 2027
- Language: English

The Legend of Zelda is an upcoming fantasy adventure film based on the video game series of the same name by Nintendo. It is directed by Wes Ball, written by T. S. Nowlin, and produced by Columbia Pictures, Nintendo, and OddBall Entertainment. The film stars Benjamin Evan Ainsworth, Bo Bragason, Uli Latukefu, Dichen Lachman, Yvonne Strahovski, Lydia Peckham, and Sam Neill in one of his final film appearances.

A Zelda film adaptation was proposed by Imagi Animation Studios in 2007, but was declined by Nintendo because of the failure of the 1993 Super Mario Bros. film. Nintendo announced the film in 2023 after having been developed by the Zelda creator, Shigeru Miyamoto, and the film's co-producer, Avi Arad, for several years. Principal photography began in November 2025, four months after Ainsworth and Bragason's casting was announced, and wrapped in April 2026.

The Legend of Zelda is scheduled for release in the United States on April 30, 2027, distributed by Sony Pictures Releasing.

== Cast ==
- Benjamin Evan Ainsworth as Link
- Bo Bragason as Princess Zelda
- Uli Latukefu as Ganondorf
- Dichen Lachman as Impa
- Yvonne Strahovski
- Sam Neill
- Lydia Peckham

== Production ==
=== Development ===
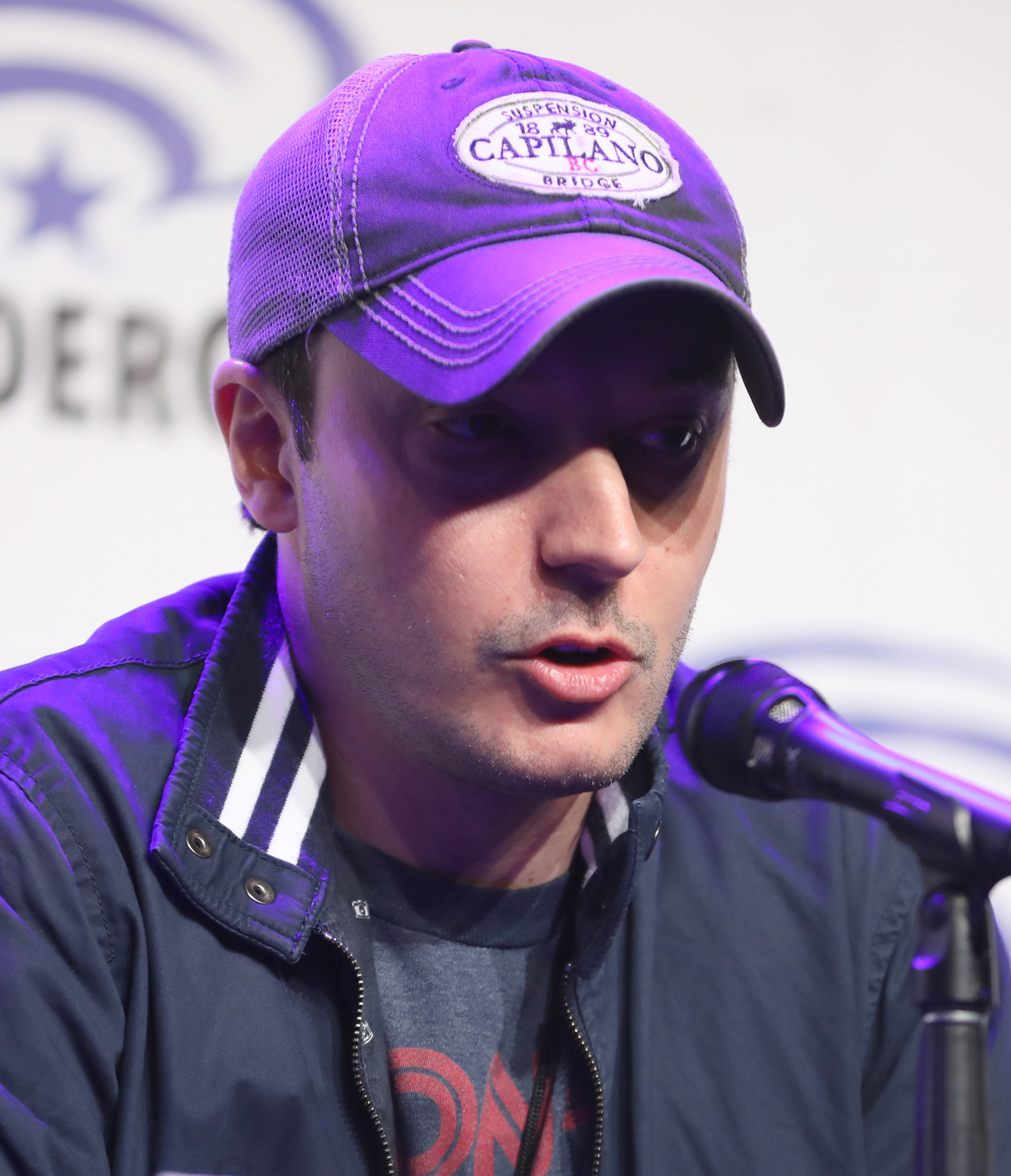
Director Wes Ball in 2024

In 2007, Imagi Animation Studios created a pitch reel for a computer-animated The Legend of Zelda film, but Nintendo did not accept the studio's offer, with reluctance in adapting their games following the critical and commercial failure of the 1993 live-action Super Mario Bros. film. The project's existence was made public in April 2013, when a teaser trailer made as a proof of concept surfaced on Vimeo as part of a former Imagi employee's portfolio. In October 2013, series producer Eiji Aonuma stated that, if development of a film began, the company would want to use the opportunity to embrace audience interaction in some capacity.

In June 2023, it was reported that Nintendo was close to closing a deal with Illumination and Universal Pictures to produce a film adaptation of the Zelda franchise following the success of their film The Super Mario Bros. Movie earlier that year. However, Illumination CEO Chris Meledandri denied these reports later that month.

In November 2023, Nintendo announced that they were developing a live-action The Legend of Zelda film, with Sony Pictures co-financing and handling worldwide theatrical distribution. Wes Ball was hired to direct, with Derek Connolly writing the screenplay, and Shigeru Miyamoto and Avi Arad serving as producers alongside Ball and his producing partner Joe Hartwick Jr. through their OddBall Entertainment company. According to Miyamoto, he and Arad had been working on a Zelda film for many years. Following the announcement, fans discovered a tweet by Ball from January 2010 in which he suggested the idea of a Zelda film, describing it as "the next big mo-cap Avatar-like movie" and saying that he "could never even hope to have the chance to direct it". By June 2025, Connolly had been replaced as screenwriter by T. S. Nowlin, who previously collaborated with Ball on the Maze Runner film series.

=== Casting ===
In July 2025, it was announced that Bo Bragason and Benjamin Evan Ainsworth had been cast as Zelda and Link respectively. In November 2025, leaked footage of the filming showed another cast member, leading to speculation surrounding Dichen Lachman playing Impa. Lachman's casting as Impa was confirmed by Deadline Hollywood in August 2026, along with Uli Latukefu as Ganondorf, Yvonne Strahovski, Lydia Peckham, and Sam Neill in one of his final roles prior to his death in July 2026.

=== Filming ===
Principal photography began in November 2025, in Wellington, New Zealand, under the codename Umami, and wrapped in April 2026. (Note: Attributed to multiple sources:) Filming also occurred in Otago at Glenorchy, a location prominently used in Peter Jackson's Lord of the Rings trilogy. Gyula Pados served as cinematographer.

== Marketing ==
On November 17, 2025, Nintendo released three photos, showing Ainsworth as Link and Bragason as Zelda in a field. The logo was revealed during a Nintendo Direct presentation centered on the 40th anniversary of the Legend of Zelda franchise, with Miyamoto stating that the lack of a subtitle is intentional and that audiences will understand why upon seeing the film.

== Release ==
The Legend of Zelda is scheduled for release worldwide on April 30, 2027, by Sony Pictures Releasing. It was originally scheduled for March 26 and May 7, 2027. In November 2024, a financial report from Nintendo revealed that The Legend of Zelda would be released sometime in the latter half of the 2020s, between 2025 and 2029. The original release date was announced through the Nintendo Today mobile app in March 2025, one day after the app's release.

== See also ==
- List of films based on video games
