= The Maze Runner (film) =

2014 American science fiction film

- Theatrical release poster
- Directed by: Wes Ball
- Screenplay by: Noah Oppenheim; Grant Pierce Myers; T. S. Nowlin
- Based on: The Maze Runner by James Dashner
- Produced by: Ellen Goldsmith-Vein; Wyck Godfrey; Marty Bowen; Lee Stollman
- Starring: Dylan O'Brien; Kaya Scodelario; Thomas Brodie-Sangster; Will Poulter; Patricia Clarkson
- Cinematography: Enrique Chediak
- Edited by: Dan Zimmerman
- Music by: John Paesano
- Production companies: Gotham Group; Temple Hill Entertainment; Oddball Entertainment
- Distributed by: 20th Century Fox
- Release date: September 19, 2014 (United States)
- Running time: 113 minutes
- Country: United States
- Language: English
- Budget: $34 million
- Box office: $348 million

The Maze Runner is a 2014 American science fiction film directed by Wes Ball, in his feature directorial debut, based on James Dashner's 2009 novel. It is the first installment in The Maze Runner film series and was written by Noah Oppenheim, Grant Pierce Myers and T. S. Nowlin. The film stars Dylan O'Brien, Kaya Scodelario, Thomas Brodie-Sangster, Will Poulter and Patricia Clarkson. The story follows sixteen-year-old Thomas, portrayed by O'Brien, who awakens in a rusty elevator with no memory of who he is, only to learn that he has been delivered to the middle of an intricate maze, along with many other boys, who have been trying to find their way out of the ever-changing labyrinth—all while establishing a functioning society in what they call the Glade.

Development of The Maze Runner began in January 2011 when Fox purchased the film rights to Dashner's novel with Gotham Group and Temple Hill Entertainment as producers and Catherine Hardwicke intended to direct. In 2012, Ball was hired to direct the film adaptation after presenting an animated short film titled Ruin with a similar tone and was initially considered for a feature-length adaptation. Principal photography began in Baton Rouge, Louisiana on May 13, 2013, and officially concluded on July 12, 2013.

The Maze Runner was released on September 19, 2014, in the United States by 20th Century Fox. The film received positive reviews, with praise for Ball's direction, the performances and the film's tone. Critics considered it to be better than most young adult book-to-film adaptations. The film was first at the box office in its opening weekend, grossing $32.5 million, making it the seventh-highest-grossing debut in September. The film earned $348 million worldwide at the box office, against its budget of $34 million. Two sequels, Maze Runner: The Scorch Trials and Maze Runner: The Death Cure, were released in 2015 and 2018.

== Plot ==
A teenage boy awakens in an underground elevator without memory of his identity. A large group of male youths greets him in a large grassy area, called the "Glade", enclosed by massive stone walls. The "Gladers" have formed a rudimentary society, each taking on specialized roles. The boy learns that a vast maze encircles the Glade and is their only means of escape. During the day, designated "Runners" search the maze for an exit and return before its gate closes at sunset. After a fight with Gally, the boy remembers his name is Thomas.

Thomas is attacked by Ben, a Runner who was stung and left delirious by a Griever, one of the biomechanical, spider-like creatures that roam the maze at night. The Gladers force Ben into the maze, as there is no cure for his condition, and leave him to die.

The next morning, Alby, the Glade's leader, and Minho, the lead Runner, retrace Ben's steps inside the maze. However, as the sun sets, Minho reappears near the gate, dragging a badly injured Alby who has been stung. Unable to reach the Glade in time, Thomas runs into the maze to help, leaving all three trapped. Thomas is chased by a Griever but manages to lure it into a closing passageway, crushing it. The three survive the night and return the next morning.

A girl arrives in the elevator with two syringes of Griever anti-venom and a note saying she is the last to enter the Glade. She recognizes Thomas, but he does not remember her. Gally accuses Thomas of disrupting the peace between the Gladers and the Grievers and insists he be punished. However, Newt, Alby's second-in-command, designates Thomas as a Runner instead. Thomas, Minho, Frypan, Winston and Zart enter the maze to locate the Griever's corpse and retrieve a mechanical device inside of it. Minho later shows Thomas a maze model based on previous explorations and explains that numbered sections open and close in a fixed sequence. Thomas realizes that the device corresponds to a specific section of the maze. One of the anti-venom syringes is used on Alby, who recovers quickly. Minho and Thomas venture back into the maze with the device and discover a potential exit but are forced to retreat after a series of traps suddenly activate.

Later that night, the maze entrance remains open, and additional gates open up, allowing Grievers to invade the Glade. Alby, Zart and many other Gladers are killed, leading Gally to blame Thomas for the chaos. Thomas, who has been experiencing fragmented memory flashes since his arrival, stabs himself with a severed Griever's stinger to recover his memories before receiving the last dose of the anti-venom. While unconscious, Thomas remembers that he and Teresa once worked for the World Catastrophe Killzone Department (WCKD), the organization behind the maze, and that all the Gladers are being used as test subjects for an experiment. He awakens and reveals his past.

Having taken command overnight, Gally plans to use Thomas and Teresa as bait for the Grievers, believing it will restore peace. However, several Gladers free them and enter the maze together, while Gally and a few Gladers stay behind. Jeff and several other Gladers are killed by Grievers as the rest escape through the maze exit.

The Gladers eventually reach a laboratory strewn with corpses. In a video recording, a WCKD scientist and director, Ava Paige, explains that massive solar flares followed by a pandemic caused by the Flare virus has devastated the planet, and the Gladers were part of an experiment to find a cure for the virus. The recording ends with Paige shooting herself as armed personnel storm the lab and kill everyone. Gally, having been stung by a Griever while following the group, declares that they will never be free and attempts to fire a gun at Thomas. Minho spears Gally, but not before Gally fatally shoots Chuck. As Thomas mourns Chuck's death, masked soldiers arrive and escort them to a helicopter, which flies over a vast desert wasteland toward a ruined city.

Later, the supposedly dead scientists gather in a room with Paige, who remarks that the experiment was a success and that the survivors are now entering Phase Two.

== Cast ==
- Dylan O'Brien as Thomas, the last male to enter the Glade
- Kaya Scodelario as Teresa, the only female to ever enter the Glade, as well as the last Glader
- Aml Ameen as Alby, the first to enter the Glade and the leader of the Gladers
- Thomas Brodie-Sangster as Newt, second-in-command of the Gladers
- Ki Hong Lee as Minho, the keeper of the runners
- Will Poulter as Gally, the keeper of the builders
- Patricia Clarkson as Ava Paige, the head of WCKD
- Blake Cooper as Chuck, a very young Glader
- Dexter Darden as Frypan, the cook
- Jacob Latimore as Jeff
- Chris Sheffield as Ben, a runner
- Joe Adler as Zart
- Randall D. Cunningham as Clint
- Alexander Flores as Winston
- Don McManus as Masked Man, an armed soldier who rescues the Gladers

== Production ==
=== Development ===
On January 4, 2011, it was announced that 20th Century Fox had obtained the rights to a film adaptation of The Maze Runner by James Dashner, with Catherine Hardwicke attached to direct. On August 23, 2012 Wes Ball was confirmed to direct the film, with Gotham Group as producers. Ball produced an animated science fiction post-apocalyptic short film, titled Ruin, and presented the short in 3D to 20th Century Fox. The studio initially considered a film adaptation of the short film, as it had the same tone of The Maze Runner novel they already planned to bring to the screen. Ball was then offered the chance to direct the novel adaptation.

=== Griever design ===
In late 2012, director Wes Ball hired creature designer Ken Barthelmey to design the Grievers. Impressed by Barthelmey's test design, Ball asked him to add a mechanical scorpion tail. Barthelmey's inspirations for the Grievers included spiders, coconut crabs, caterpillars and piranhas. Barthelmey also worked on several Maze, Beetle Blade (cut from the film) and Crank designs.

=== Casting ===
For the role of Teresa, Kaya Scodelario was Ball's first choice as she was "fantastic" and because he loved her in the TV show Skins. Dylan O'Brien, the lead role, was initially rejected by Ball. Ball recounts, "Dylan was actually... I saw him early on, very early on and I overlooked him. It was a big learning experience there because I overlooked him because of his hair. He had Teen Wolf hair and I couldn't see past that and so we were looking for our Thomas and it's a tough role to make because he comes in as a boy and he leaves as a man, so it can't be like this badass action star that comes into this movie. It's about vulnerability upfront and then he comes out of it and comes into his own and then the next movies are about the leader that emerges from the group. So finally Fox says 'We just did this movie, The Internship. There's this kid that's in this thing. He's like 20 years old. We think he's kind of got something.' So I watched his tape and was like 'Wait a minute, I've seen this kid before.' I looked him up online and there was one picture of him with a totally shaved head and it's this sweet vulnerable-looking kid and I was like 'Whoa, interesting.' I said, 'Wait a minute, he's just so familiar and I looked back at my old audition tapes, which we had thousands of, and there's Dylan. That guy I said 'No, definitely not him.' So we brought him back in and we started to talk with him and I'm like 'he's the coolest dude ever.'" Blake Cooper entered the film via Twitter. Ball revealed a lot on Twitter, and many kids wanted to be Chuck. Cooper constantly bugged Ball, until Ball told him to give his tape to his casting director, and Ball was impressed by Cooper's tape and cast him.

=== Filming ===
Principal photography started in Baton Rouge, Louisiana on May 13, 2013, and officially ended on July 12, 2013. Post-production on the film was completed in June 2014.

=== Soundtrack ===
Composed by John Paesano, the soundtrack consists of 21 tracks and was released on September 16, 2014.

== Release ==
The film was originally set to be released on February 14, 2014. On October 5, 2013, the film was pushed back. IMAX theaters released the film on September 19, 2014.

=== Marketing ===
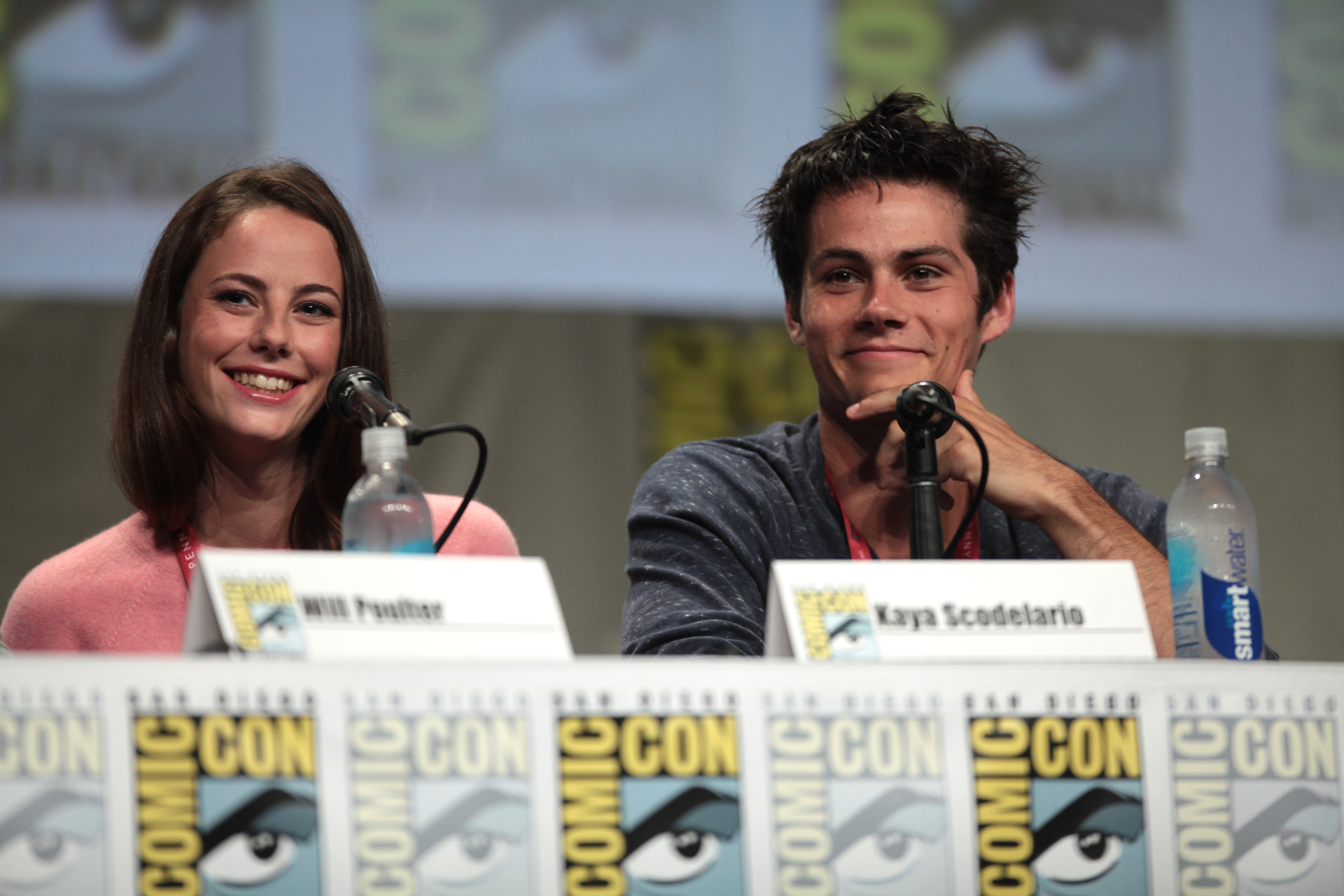
Kaya Scodelario and Dylan O'Brien at a panel for the film at San Diego Comic-Con in July 2014

Eleven character cards for the film were released in July 2013. Starting in January 2014, director Wes Ball released one image from the film once a week, leading up to the film's first trailer released on March 17, 2014. A viral marketing campaign launched by 20th Century Fox began on April 16, 2014. The campaign is a website featuring the main characters while focusing on WCKD, an organization in Dashner's novel series of the same name. The website has the domain wckdisgood.com.

On June 26, 2014, O'Brien tweeted that the original The Maze Runner book would be re-released with a new book cover based on the film's poster. On July 29, 2014, the second trailer for the film was released exclusively on Yahoo! Movies.

== Reception ==
=== Box office ===
The film grossed $102 million in North America and more than $246 million in other territories for a worldwide total of $348 million.

Prior to its release in the U.S. and Canada, box office analysts predicted the film would be a box office success, citing effective marketing, good word-of-mouth publicity and a solid release date. Preliminary reports predicted the film would open with takings of over $30–32 million in North America. According to movie-ticket sale website Fandango, The Maze Runner was the biggest seller accounting for more than 50% of early tickets sales. The film was released on September 19, 2014, in the United States and Canada across 3,604 locations and over 350 IMAX theaters. It earned $1.1 million from Thursday night shows, and $11.25 million on its opening day. It topped the box office on its opening weekend with $32.5 million of which 9% of the gross came from IMAX theaters. Its opening weekend gross is the seventh highest for a film released in September, and the 18th highest for a young-adult book adaptation. The film earned a total of $102,272,088 at the North American box office becoming the 26th-highest-grossing film of 2014 in the U.S. and Canada.

Outside North America, the film debuted in five countries a week prior to its North American release and earned a total of $8.3 million. The film had a similar success overseas during its wide-opening second weekend earning $38 million from 7,547 screens in 51 markets. It opened in South Korea with $5.5 million—higher than the openings of The Hunger Games and Divergent, the UK, Ireland and Malta with $3.4 million behind Gone Girl, and China with $14.58 million behind Teenage Mutant Ninja Turtles. Other high openings were witnessed in Russia and the CIS ($5.75 million), France ($5.2 million), Australia ($3.4 million), Mexico ($2.6 million), Taiwan ($2.2 million) and Brazil ($2 million).

It became the third-highest-grossing film of all time in Malaysia for Fox (behind Avatar and X-Men: Days of Future Past).

=== Critical response ===
Review aggregator Rotten Tomatoes assigns the film a score of 66% based on 173 reviews, with an average rating of 5.9/10. The site's consensus states: "With strong acting, a solid premise, and a refreshingly dark approach to its dystopian setting, The Maze Runner stands out from the crowded field of YA sci-fi adventures". Metacritic gives the film a score of 57 out of 100, based on 34 critics, indicating "mixed or average reviews". Audiences surveyed by CinemaScore gave the film a grade of A− on an A+ to F scale. According to Tim Ryan of The Wall Street Journal, critics considered the film better than most young adult book-to-film adaptations due to its "strong performances and a creepy, mysterious atmosphere".

Rafer Guzmán of Newsday gave the film a three out of four and described it as "solid, well crafted and entertaining". Christy Lemire of RogerEbert.com said she found the film intriguing, writing that "it tells us a story we think we've heard countless times before but with a refreshingly different tone and degree of detail". The Seattle Times's Soren Anderson said the film was "vastly superior to the book that inspired it" and gave it a score of 3/4. Tony Hicks of the San Jose Mercury News was "hooked by the combination of fine acting, intriguing premise and riveting scenery". Matthew Toomey of ABC Radio Brisbane gave the film a grade of A−, giving praise to its intriguing premise saying that "it held [his] attention for its full two-hour running time". Justin Lowe of The Hollywood Reporter said it was "consistently engaging", and Ella Taylor of Variety wrote "as world-creation YA pictures go, The Maze Runner feels refreshingly low-tech and properly story-driven".

Michael O'Sullivan of The Washington Post said "The Maze Runner unravels a few mysteries, but it spins even more", giving it a 3/4. Stephen Whitty of the Newark Star-Ledger wrote "it does leave you wanting to see the next installment. And that's one special effect that very few YA movies ever pull off". Rick Bentley of The Fresno Bee praised Wes Ball's direction, saying that he "created balance between a thin but solid script and first-rate action—and he doesn't waste a frame doing it". Bill Zwecker of the Chicago Sun-Times called it "a well-acted and intelligent thriller/futuristic sci-fi romp". Bilge Ebiri of New York magazine said he "was quite riveted". Michael Sragow of the Orange County Register gave it a grade of B and said, "Ball is deft, though, at evoking claustrophobia of every kind, whether in the open-air prison of the Glade or the actual tight spaces of the Maze. And he elicits a hair-trigger performance from O'Brien".

Claudia Puig of USA Today said "a sci-fi thriller set in a vaguely post-apocalyptic future must create a fully drawn universe to thoroughly captivate the viewer. But Maze Runner feels only partially formed", giving it a score of 2/4. Time magazine's Richard Corliss said "like Jean-Paul Sartre's No Exit-tentialism, but more crowded and with the musk of bottled-up testosterone". Wesley Morris of the website Grantland said "I think I have a touch of apocalepsy—excessive sleepiness caused by prolonged exposure to three- and four-part series in which adolescents rebel against oppressive governments represented by esteemed actors". Steven Rea of The Philadelphia Inquirer gave the film a 2.5 out of 4 rating and said "it's bleak business, and as it hurries toward its explosive, expository conclusion, the film becomes nonsensical, too". Film critic Ethan Gilsdorf of The Boston Globe said "teens should eat up this fantasy's scenery-chewing angst and doom, and the hopeful tale of survival and empowerment (to be continued in the inevitable sequel or sequels)".

=== Accolades ===
List of awards and nominations
Year	Award	Category	Nominee(s)	Result
2014	IFMCA Awards	Best Original Score for an Action/Adventure/Thriller Film	John Paesano	Nominated
2015	MTV Movie Awards	Best Breakthrough Performance	Dylan O'Brien	Won
2015	MTV Movie Awards	Best Fight	Dylan O'Brien and Will Poulter	Won
2015	MTV Movie Awards	Best Hero	Dylan O'Brien	Won
2015	MTV Movie Awards	Best Scared-As-Shit Performance	Dylan O'Brien	Nominated
2015	Teen Choice Awards	Choice Movie: Action/Adventure	The Maze Runner	Nominated
2015	Teen Choice Awards	Choice Movie: Breakout Star	Thomas Brodie-Sangster	Nominated
2015	Teen Choice Awards	Choice Movie: Chemistry	Dylan O'Brien and Thomas Brodie-Sangster	Nominated
2015	Teen Choice Awards	Choice Movie Actor: Action/Adventure	Dylan O'Brien	Nominated
2015	Teen Choice Awards	Choice Movie Actress: Action/Adventure	Kaya Scodelario	Nominated
2015	World Soundtrack Awards	Public Choice Award	John Paesano	Won
2016	Nickelodeon Kids' Choice Awards	Favorite Book	James Dashner	Nominated

== Sequels ==
On October 11, 2013, it was reported that Twentieth Century Fox had acquired the rights to the second book, The Scorch Trials. A screenplay was written by T. S. Nowlin, with director Wes Ball supervising the scriptwriting. The sequel was released on September 18, 2015. On July 25, 2014, Ball announced at San Diego Comic-Con that filming for the sequel would commence sometime between March and May 2015, should The Maze Runner become a success when it hits the theaters. However, two weeks prior to the film's release 20th Century Fox decided to move ahead with the sequel and pre-production began in early September 2014 in New Mexico. Cast members Dylan O'Brien, Kaya Scodelario, Thomas Brodie-Sangster, Ki-Hong Lee and Patricia Clarkson reprised their roles for the sequel, as did director Wes Ball. It was announced that Aidan Gillen would be joining the film to play Janson ("Rat-Man"), as was Rosa Salazar who portrayed Brenda, Jacob Lofland who starred as Aris Jones, and Giancarlo Esposito who played Jorge Gallaraga.

A second sequel, Maze Runner: The Death Cure was released on January 26, 2018.

== In pop culture ==
On February 27, 2020, South Korean boy band BTS released their music video "On", which referenced set pieces from The Maze Runner. The homage was noted by source book author Dashner on Twitter.

Anson Lo said the opening of his 2022 song "King Kong" music video paid tribute to The Maze Runner. He is the director of the music video.
