= Lydia Peckham =

New Zealand actress

- Education: Nelson College for Girls; Toi Whakaari
- Occupation: Actress

Lydia Peckham is a New Zealand stage, television, and film actress.

== Biography ==
Peckham spent her childhood in Edinburgh and the West Coast of Scotland, as well as France, before growing-up in New Zealand from the age of eight years-old where she attended Nelson College for Girls and Toi Whakaari. As well as attending drama school in New Zealand, Peckham appeared on stage in England as Ariel in The Tempest at the Old Globe Theatre, and the Minack Theatre in Cornwall.

Peckham had early television roles in Cowboy Bebop for Netflix, and Mr. Corman for Apple TV+. She also appeared in the film Only Cloud Knows (2019), a Chinese and New Zealand co-production. During the COVID-19 pandemic she co-wrote a play with her sister Scarlett, which was performed in Wellington, New Zealand, when pandemic restrictions were lifted.

Peckham appeared in science-fiction film Kingdom of the Planet of the Apes as the CGI ape Soona, for which she completed a self-filmed audition tape from a tree in her family apple orchard in Nelson, New Zealand, with a camera bunny-tied to the tree. For the role she had six weeks of "Ape training" with Alain Gauthier, choreographer from Cirque du Soleil, and filmed in Australia.

In February 2024 she was cast in historical drama film Nuremberg, in the role of journalist Lila, the film premiering the following year. Later that year, she joined the cast of Amazon MGM Studios action comedy film The Wrecking Crew.

In February 2025, she was cast in the 2025 television series Robin Hood as Priscilla of Nottingham, the daughter of Sean Bean's Sheriff.

In 2025, Peckham joined the cast of the film The Legend of Zelda, an adaptation of the video game series of the same name. She had previously worked with director Wes Ball in Kingdom of the Planet of the Apes.

== Filmography ==
=== Film ===
Key
†	Denotes works that have not yet been released

Year	Title	Role	Notes
2024	Kingdom of the Planet of the Apes	Soona	
2025	Nuremberg	Lila	
2026	The Wrecking Crew	Monica Robichaux	
2027	The Legend of Zelda †		Post-production

=== Television ===
Key
†	Denotes works that have not yet been released

Year	Title	Role	Notes
2021	Mr. Corman	Beauty Influencer	1 episode
2021	Cowboy Bebop	Katerina	1 episode
2025	Robin Hood	Priscilla of Nottingham	Main role, 10 episodes
TBA	Kennedy †	Rosemary Kennedy	Upcoming series
