= John Paesano =

American composer (born 1977)

- Born: July 2, 1977 (age 49); Detroit, Michigan, U.S.
- Genres: Film and television scores, video game scores, classical rock, ambient rock, electronic rock
- Occupations: Composer, conductor, arranger, musician
- Instruments: Piano, keyboards, synthesizer
- Years active: 1997–present
- Website: johnpaesano.com

John Paesano (born July 2, 1977) is an American composer working primarily in film, television, and video games. He is known for collaborating with director Wes Ball on the Maze Runner film trilogy and Kingdom of the Planet of the Apes, as well as composing for the Marvel Television series Daredevil and The Defenders. As a video game composer, he has contributed music to the acclaimed titles Detroit: Become Human and the three installments in the Marvel's Spider-Man series. Paesano won the BAFTA Games Award for Music (Marvel's Spider-Man: Miles Morales), as well as the D.I.C.E. Award for Outstanding Achievement in Original Music Composition (Marvel's Spider-Man 2).

== Biography ==
Paesano was born in Birmingham, Michigan. He first studied classical music at Conservatoire de Paris located in Parc de la Villette, France before continuing his studies at Berklee College of Music pursuing a major in musical composition and film scoring. John knew from the age of nine years old, he wanted to become a music composer. He then worked under composers Jerry Goldsmith and John Williams providing additional music for the former, and orchestrating for the latter. Paesano cites Steven Spielberg's 1987 film Empire of the Sun as his motivation for getting into film scoring.

In 2014, Paesano was hired to compose the music for The Maze Runner. Speaking of the job, he recalled seeing Wes Ball's 2011 short film, Ruin and was intrigued by it, composing a short demo (which eventually would become the "Maze Runner" theme) for Ball. He visited the sets in New Orleans, observing the "environmental soundscape" and tried to incorporate the natural sounds into his score. He recorded the score with an orchestra at the Newman Scoring Stage with sessions running for 2 weeks. Paesano would later return to score the 2nd and 3rd film of the series, Maze Runner: The Scorch Trials and Maze Runner: The Death Cure.

Paesano was later tasked with composing the score to Spider-Man developed by Insomniac Games, joining the game's development in the early stages. He worked with game director Bryan Intihar and brought about creating several character themes, emphasising the need for the music to be its "own character" in the game. Paesano ensured that his music struck a balance between the cinematics and the gameplay as he wanted the player to be fully immersed. He looked at distinguishing his music from past Spider-Man films and games and decided to focus on creating a musical identity for Peter Parker.

In 2021, he composed the music for the Avengers Campus themed area at Disney California Adventure, combining themes from the MCU's Avengers, Spider-Man, Doctor Strange, Guardians of the Galaxy, Ant-Man, Captain Marvel, and Black Panther films; a single entitled "Welcome Recruits" was released in April 2022.

== Filmography ==
=== Film ===
Year	Title	Director(s)	Studio(s)	Notes
2007	Ben 10: Secret of the Omnitrix	Sebastian Montes; Scooter Tidwell	Cartoon Network Studios	Television film
2008	Another Cinderella Story	Damon Santostefano	Warner Home Video; Warner Premiere	Direct-to-video film
2010	Superman/Batman: Apocalypse	Lauren Montgomery	Warner Home Video; Warner Premiere; Warner Bros. Animation	Direct-to-video film
2011	S.W.A.T.: Firefight	Benny Boom	Stage 6 Films; Sony Pictures Home Entertainment	Direct-to-video film
2014	When the Game Stands Tall	Thomas Carter	TriStar Pictures	
2014	The Maze Runner	Wes Ball	20th Century Fox	
2015	Maze Runner: The Scorch Trials	Wes Ball	20th Century Fox	
2015	My All American	Angelo Pizzo	Clarius Entertainment	
2016	Brain on Fire	Gerard Barrett	Broad Green Pictures	
2016	Almost Christmas	David E. Talbert	Universal Pictures	
2017	All Eyez on Me	Benny Boom	Morgan Creek Productions	
2017	Same Kind of Different as Me	Michael Carney	Paramount Pictures	
2017	The Star	Timothy Reckart	Columbia Pictures; Sony Pictures Animation	
2018	Maze Runner: The Death Cure	Wes Ball	20th Century Fox	
2020	Tesla	Michael Almereyda	IFC Films	
2020	The Secrets We Keep	Yuval Adler	Bleecker Street	
2021	Diary of a Wimpy Kid	Swinton O. Scott III	Walt Disney Pictures; Bardel Entertainment; Disney+	
2022	Cheaper by the Dozen	Gail Lerner	Walt Disney Pictures; Disney+	
2022	Diary of a Wimpy Kid: Rodrick Rules	Luke Cormican	Walt Disney Pictures; Bardel Entertainment; Disney+	
2022	Night at the Museum: Kahmunrah Rises Again	Matt Danner	Walt Disney Pictures; 21 Laps Entertainment; Atomic Cartoons; Disney+ Alibaba Pictures	
2023	Diary of a Wimpy Kid Christmas: Cabin Fever	Luke Cormican	Walt Disney Pictures; Bardel Entertainment; Disney+	
2024	Kingdom of the Planet of the Apes	Wes Ball	20th Century Studios; Oddball Entertainment; Jason T. Reed Productions	
2025	Diary of a Wimpy Kid: The Last Straw	Matt Danner	Walt Disney Pictures; Bardel Entertainment; Disney+	

=== Television ===
Year	Title
2011	Ice Age: A Mammoth Christmas
2012–2018	DreamWorks Dragons
2014	Crisis
2015–2018	Daredevil
2017	The Defenders
2017–2018	Salvation
2019–2023	Truth Be Told
2019–2022	Devils
2019	Charmed
2020	Penny Dreadful: City of Angels
2021	The Hot Zone: Anthrax
2021	Leonardo
2021–present	Invincible
2026	The Boroughs

=== Video games ===
Year	Title	Director(s)	Studio(s)	Notes	Ref.
2017	Mass Effect: Andromeda	Mac Walters	BioWare / Electronic Arts	Debut work as video game composer	
2017	Gran Turismo Sport	Kazunori Yamauchi	Polyphony Digital / Sony Interactive Entertainment	Also used in Gran Turismo 7	
2018	Detroit: Become Human	David Cage; Gregory Diaconu	Quantic Dream	Composed the soundtrack for Markus, one of the main protagonists	
2018	Marvel's Spider-Man	Bryan Intihar; Ryan Smith	Insomniac Games / Sony Interactive Entertainment / Marvel Games	Also composed for the game's downloadable content Spider-Man: The City That Never Sleeps	
2020	Marvel's Spider-Man: Miles Morales	Brian Horton; Cameron Christian	Insomniac Games / Sony Interactive Entertainment / Marvel Games		
2022	Gran Turismo 7	Kazunori Yamauchi	Polyphony Digital / Sony Interactive Entertainment		
2023	Marvel's Spider-Man 2	Bryan Intihar; Ryan Smith	Insomniac Games / Sony Interactive Entertainment / Marvel Games		
2025	Avatar: Frontiers of Pandora (From the Ashes expansion)	Omar Bouali	Massive Entertainment		

=== Theme park attractions ===
Year	Attraction	Location(s)	Ref.
2021	Avengers Campus	Disney California Adventure	

== Awards ==
Work	Year	Award	Outcome	Ref.
DreamWorks Dragons	2012	Annie Award for Outstanding Achievement for Music in an Animated Television/Broadcast Production (for "How to Pick Your Dragon")	Won	
The Maze Runner	2014	IFMCA Awards for Best Original Score for an Action/Adventure/Thriller Film	Nominated	
The Maze Runner	2015	World Soundtrack Award for Public Choice Award	Won	
The Defenders	2018	Primetime Emmy Award for Outstanding Original Main Title Theme Music	Nominated	
Marvel's Spider-Man	2018	The Game Award for Best Score/Music	Nominated	
Marvel's Spider-Man	2018	HMMA Award for Best Original Score – Video Game	Nominated	
Marvel's Spider-Man	2019	D.I.C.E. Award for Outstanding Achievement in Original Music Composition	Nominated	
Detroit: Become Human	2019	D.I.C.E. Award for Outstanding Achievement in Original Music Composition	Nominated	
Marvel's Spider-Man: Miles Morales	2021	BAFTA Games Award for Music	Won	
Marvel's Spider-Man 2	2024	D.I.C.E. Award for Outstanding Achievement in Original Music Composition	Won	
Marvel's Spider-Man 2	2024	BAFTA Games Award for Music	Nominated	
Marvel's Spider-Man 2	2025	Grammy Award for Best Score Soundtrack for Video Games and Other Interactive Media	Nominated	
Avatar: Frontiers of Pandora — From the Ashes	2027	Grammy Award for Best Score Soundtrack for Video Games and Other Interactive Media	Pending	
