= T. S. Nowlin =

American screenwriter

- Born: Thomas Scott Nowlin
- Education: Florida State University
- Occupation: Screenwriter
- Years active: 2014–present

Thomas Scott Nowlin is an American screenwriter. He is known for writing the screenplays for the films James Dashner's The Maze Runner film adaptation trilogy (2014–2018), Pacific Rim Uprising (2018), and The Adam Project (2022).

== Early life and career ==
Nowlin went to the film school at Florida State University.

Nowlin wrote his debut screenplay in 2014 of a science fiction action film The Maze Runner, which was directed by Wes Ball. He also wrote the script of its sequel film Maze Runner: The Scorch Trials, released in 2015, and Maze Runner: The Death Cure, the final installment of the trilogy.

Nowlin also co-wrote the screenplay and story for the film Pacific Rim Uprising, with director Steven S. DeKnight. In April 2012, it was reported that Universal Pictures had bought the distribution rights to Agent 13, an adaptation of comic book Agent 13: The Midnight Avenger, adapted by Nowlin with Charlize Theron attached to star and Rupert Wyatt to direct. Later in July 2012, 20th Century Fox hired Ball and Nowlin to co-write the script of feature live-action adaptation of Ball's animated short film Ruin, which Ball would also direct. In October 2012, Nowlin's spec script Our Name Is Adam was bought by producer Mary Parent with attaching Tom Cruise to play the lead role. The film was later renamed to The Adam Project with Ryan Reynolds and Jennifer Garner starring, and was released on Netflix March 11, 2022.

Nowlin returned to collaborating with Wes Ball when, in June 2025, he replaced Derek Connolly as screenwriter for the upcoming The Legend of Zelda film.

=== Unrealized projects ===
In 2010, it was reported that Nowlin had written a spec script Columbus about Christopher Columbus, which was bought by Relativity Media with McG attached to direct the film. He also wrote a Western thriller spec Wild Guns which he sold to Warner Bros. Pictures in April 2011, Gianni Nunnari would produce the film through Hollywood Gang Productions.

== Filmography ==
Year	Title	Writer	Producer
2014	Never	No	Executive
2014	The Maze Runner	Yes	No
2015	Maze Runner: The Scorch Trials	Yes	Executive
2015	Manson Family Vacation	No	Executive
2017	Phoenix Forgotten	Yes	Yes
2018	Maze Runner: The Death Cure	Yes	Executive
2018	Pacific Rim Uprising	Yes	No
2022	The Adam Project	Yes	No
2027	The Legend of Zelda	Yes	No
