= Maze Runner (film series) =

Films based on the books by James Dashner

- Official film series logo
- Directed by: Wes Ball
- Based on: The Maze Runner by James Dashner
- Starring: Dylan O'Brien; Kaya Scodelario; Thomas Brodie-Sangster; Ki Hong Lee; Dexter Darden; Patricia Clarkson
- Production companies: Gotham Group; Temple Hill Entertainment; Oddball Entertainment (3)
- Distributed by: 20th Century Fox
- Release dates: September 19, 2014 (Maze Runner); September 18, 2015 (Scorch Trials); January 26, 2018 (Death Cure)
- Country: United States
- Language: English
- Budget: Total (3 films): $157 million
- Box office: Total (3 films): $949 million

The Maze Runner film series consists of American science-fiction dystopian action adventure films based on The Maze Runner novels by the American author James Dashner. Produced by Ellen Goldsmith-Vein and distributed by 20th Century Fox, the films star Dylan O'Brien, Kaya Scodelario, Thomas Brodie-Sangster, Ki Hong Lee, Dexter Darden, and Patricia Clarkson. T. S. Nowlin wrote and Wes Ball directed all three installments.

The first film, titled The Maze Runner, was released on September 19, 2014, and grossed over $348 million worldwide. The second installment, Maze Runner: The Scorch Trials, was released on September 18, 2015, and grossed over $312 million at the box office. The third movie, Maze Runner: The Death Cure, was released on January 26, 2018, and grossed less than its predecessors, with a worldwide gross of $288 million.

The series will continue, with additional films in development under the Walt Disney Company's direction.

== Films ==
The Maze Runner films
Film	U.S. release date	Directed by	Screenplay by	Produced by
The Maze Runner	September 19, 2014	Wes Ball	Noah Oppenheim & Grant Pierce Myers and T. S. Nowlin	Ellen Goldsmith-Vein, Wyck Godfrey, Marty Bowen and Lee Stollman
Maze Runner: The Scorch Trials	September 18, 2015	Wes Ball	T. S. Nowlin	Ellen Goldsmith-Vein, Wyck Godfrey, Marty Bowen, Lee Stollman and Joe Hartwick Jr.
Maze Runner: The Death Cure	January 26, 2018	Wes Ball	T. S. Nowlin	Ellen Goldsmith-Vein, Wyck Godfrey, Marty Bowen, Lee Stollman, Joe Hartwick Jr. and Wes Ball

=== The Maze Runner (2014) ===
The film features Thomas, who wakes up trapped in a maze with a group of other boys. He has no memory of the outside world other than dreams about an organization known as WCKD (World Catastrophe Killzone Department). Only by piecing together fragments of his past with clues he discovers in the maze can Thomas hope to uncover his purpose and a way to escape.

Development for the film began in January 2011 when Fox purchased the film rights to Dashner's novel The Maze Runner. Principal photography began in Baton Rouge, Louisiana in May 2013 and ended in July. It was released on September 19, 2014.

=== Maze Runner: The Scorch Trials (2015) ===
The film features Thomas and his fellow Gladers as they search for clues about the organization known as WCKD. Their journey takes them to the Scorch, a desolate landscape filled with obstacles. Teaming up with resistance fighters, the Gladers take on WCKD's "vastly superior" forces and uncover its plans for them all.

Principal photography commenced in Albuquerque, New Mexico, in October 2014 and ended in January 2015. It was released on September 18, 2015.

=== Maze Runner: The Death Cure (2018) ===
In the third Maze Runner, Thomas leads his group of escaped Gladers on their final and most dangerous mission yet. To save their friends, they must break into the legendary Last City, a WCKD-controlled safe zone designed to keep people out. They attempt to enter to rescue their friends, seeking answers to the questions the Gladers have been asking since they first arrived in the maze.

In March 2015, T. S. Nowlin, who co-wrote the first and wrote the second film, was hired to write Maze Runner: The Death Cure based on the novel The Death Cure. In September 2015, Ball was hired to direct the film. Ball said that the film would not be split into two films. Principal photography took place in Cape Town, South Africa between March and June 2017 for a January 26, 2018, release.

=== Reboot ===
Following the acquisition of 21st Century Fox by Disney in March 2019, Disney confirmed in April 2019 at their CinemaCon presentation that new Maze Runner films were in development.

In May 2024, it was announced that a reboot was in development, with Wes Ball returning as a producer and Jack Paglen hired as writer. The new installment was described as "not a redo of the story nor ... a direct sequel to the original trilogy" but "a sort of continuation ... yet also return to the elements that made the first movie connect with its audience".

== Recurring cast and characters ==
Character	Films		
Character	The Maze Runner	Maze Runner: The Scorch Trials	Maze Runner: The Death Cure
Thomas	Dylan O'Brien	Dylan O'Brien	Dylan O'Brien
Teresa	Kaya Scodelario	Kaya Scodelario	Kaya Scodelario
Newt	Thomas Brodie-Sangster	Thomas Brodie-Sangster	Thomas Brodie-Sangster
Minho	Ki Hong Lee	Ki Hong Lee	Ki Hong Lee
Frypan	Dexter Darden	Dexter Darden	Dexter Darden
Ava Paige	Patricia Clarkson	Patricia Clarkson	Patricia Clarkson
Winston	Alexander Flores	Alexander Flores	
Gally	Will Poulter		Will Poulter
Janson		Aidan Gillen	Aidan Gillen
Aris		Jacob Lofland	Jacob Lofland
Brenda		Rosa Salazar	Rosa Salazar
Jorge		Giancarlo Esposito	Giancarlo Esposito
Vince		Barry Pepper	Barry Pepper
Sonya		Katherine McNamara	Katherine McNamara
Harriet		Nathalie Emmanuel	Nathalie Emmanuel

== Crew and details ==
Title	Crew and details					
Title	Composer	Cinematographer	Editor(s)	Production companies	Distributing companies	Running time
The Maze Runner	John Paesano	Enrique Chediak	Dan Zimmerman	Gotham Group, Temple Hill Entertainment	20th Century Fox	1 hr 53 mins
The Maze Runner: The Scorch Trials	John Paesano	Gyula Pados	Dan Zimmerman	Gotham Group, Temple Hill Entertainment	20th Century Fox	2 hrs 11 mins
The Maze Runner: The Death Cure	John Paesano	Gyula Pados	Dan Zimmerman & Paul Harb	Gotham Group, Temple Hill Entertainment, Oddball Entertainment	20th Century Fox	2 hrs 23 mins

== Music ==
Title	U.S. release date	Composer(s)	Label
The Maze Runner (Original Motion Picture Soundtrack)	September 12, 2014	John Paesano	Sony Classical
Maze Runner: The Scorch Trials (Original Motion Picture Soundtrack)	September 11, 2015	John Paesano	Sony Classical
Maze Runner: The Death Cure (Original Motion Picture Soundtrack)	January 26, 2018	John Paesano	Sony Classical

== Reception ==
=== Box office performance ===
Film	Release date	Box office gross			Box office ranking		Production budget	Ref.
Film	Release date	North America	Other territories	Worldwide	All time North America	All time worldwide	Production budget	Ref.
The Maze Runner	September 19, 2014	$102,427,862	$245,891,999	$348,319,861	580	285	$34 million	
Maze Runner: The Scorch Trials	September 18, 2015	$81,697,192	$230,627,911	$312,325,103	810	337	$61 million	
Maze Runner: The Death Cure	January 26, 2018	$58,032,443	$230,385,747	$288,418,190	1,377	467	$62 million	
		Total						
		$242,157,497	$706,905,657	$949,063,154			$157 million	

All Maze Runner films opened at number one at the North American box office during their opening weekend. In North America, the Maze Runner film series is the fifth-highest-grossing film series based on young adult books, after the film series of Harry Potter, The Hunger Games, The Twilight Saga, and The Divergent Series, respectively, earning $242 million. Worldwide, it is the fourth-highest-grossing film series based on young-adult books, after the film series of Harry Potter, The Twilight Saga, and The Hunger Games, respectively, earning $949 million from a $157 million total production budget.

=== Critical and public response ===
The Maze Runner trilogy has received a mixed critical response, with the primary source of criticism being the plot and character development, although its performances and action sequences have been praised.

Film	Rotten Tomatoes	Metacritic	CinemaScore
The Maze Runner	65% (172 reviews)	57 (34 reviews)	A−
Maze Runner: The Scorch Trials	47% (152 reviews)	43 (29 reviews)	B+
Maze Runner: The Death Cure	43% (171 reviews)	50 (38 reviews)	B+
