= Maze Runner: The Scorch Trials =

2015 film by Wes Ball

- Theatrical release poster
- Directed by: Wes Ball
- Screenplay by: T. S. Nowlin
- Based on: The Scorch Trials by James Dashner
- Produced by: Ellen Goldsmith-Vein; Wyck Godfrey; Marty Bowen; Lee Stollman; Joe Hartwick Jr.
- Starring: Dylan O'Brien; Kaya Scodelario; Thomas Brodie-Sangster; Giancarlo Esposito; Aidan Gillen; Ki Hong Lee; Barry Pepper; Lili Taylor; Patricia Clarkson
- Cinematography: Gyula Pados
- Edited by: Dan Zimmerman
- Music by: John Paesano
- Production companies: Gotham Group; Temple Hill Entertainment
- Distributed by: 20th Century Fox
- Release date: September 18, 2015 (United States)
- Running time: 131 minutes
- Country: United States
- Language: English
- Budget: $61 million
- Box office: $312 million

Maze Runner: The Scorch Trials (stylized onscreen simply as The Scorch Trials) is a 2015 American science fiction film based on James Dashner's 2010 novel The Scorch Trials, the second novel in The Maze Runner book series. It is a direct sequel to the 2014 film The Maze Runner and the second installment in The Maze Runner film series. The film was directed by Wes Ball, with a screenplay by T. S. Nowlin. Adding to the original film's cast of Dylan O'Brien, Ki Hong Lee, Thomas Brodie-Sangster, Patricia Clarkson, Kaya Scodelario, Dexter Darden and Alexander Flores, the new supporting cast includes Giancarlo Esposito, Aidan Gillen, Barry Pepper and Lili Taylor. The plot of The Scorch Trials takes place immediately following the previous installment, as Thomas (O'Brien) and his fellow Gladers uncover the truth about the sinister organization WCKD and flee into the Scorch, a sun-scorched wasteland filled with zombie-like victims of the deadly Flare virus, in search of a resistance group.

Filming began in Albuquerque, New Mexico on October 27, 2014, and officially concluded on January 27, 2015.

Maze Runner: The Scorch Trials was released in select international territories starting September 9, 2015, in 2D, 3D, 4DX and Barco Escape, and was released on September 18, 2015, in the United States in 2D and premium large-format theaters by 20th Century Fox. It was originally set to be released in IMAX, but this was canceled, except Japan (converted to 3D), as Everest had all worldwide IMAX screens booked until the release of the film The Walk. The Scorch Trials received mixed reviews: some commended its action sequences and performances; others criticized the film for its lack of plot and character advancement. Like its predecessor, the film was a commercial success grossing $30.3 million on its opening weekend, making it the ninth-highest grossing debut in September. The film went to the number one spot at the box office during its opening weekend, and grossed $312 million worldwide.

The concluding entry, titled Maze Runner: The Death Cure, was released on January 26, 2018.

== Plot ==
In a flashback, a woman leaves her son, Thomas, with the scientist Ava Paige and armed operatives from the World Catastrophe Killzone Department (WCKD) to ensure his survival. Thomas, along with other children, is eventually placed in a confined maze, later called the "Glade," as part of WCKD's scientific trials to study immunity to the Flare virus.

Years later, shortly after escaping the maze, (Note: As depicted in The Maze Runner (2014)) Thomas and the surviving Gladers are brought to a facility managed by Mr. Janson. Janson presents the facility as a haven protecting them from the "Cranks", humans who have been infected and driven mad by the Flare virus. While recovering, the group learns that their maze was not the only one constructed; other young survivors from separate trials are present as well.

Suspicious of Janson, Thomas teams up with Aris, a survivor from a different maze who was the first to arrive at the facility, to investigate. He discovers that Ava Paige is still alive and overseeing WCKD's operations, and that Janson is working for them. He later overhears them discussing ongoing experiments on Immunes, survivors of the maze trials naturally resistant to the Flare virus, as well as an active search for the Right Arm resistance group based in the mountains. The Gladers and Aris rescue Teresa, who had been held separately, and escape the facility into the desolate outside world called the Scorch. Janson dispatches WCKD soldiers to pursue and apprehend them.

The group takes shelter in an abandoned shopping mall but is soon attacked by a horde of Cranks and narrowly escapes; Winston is scratched during the encounter and becomes infected. By morning, his symptoms worsen, forcing the group to let him shoot himself before he succumbs to the virus. To escape a deadly lightning storm, the group flees into an abandoned facility, where they encounter Brenda and Jorge, leaders of a local survivor camp. Though initially wary, Brenda and Jorge agree to help them locate the Right Arm, abandoning the other survivors when WCKD locates and raids the facility. In the chaos, Thomas and Brenda become separated from the others and are forced to flee on foot.

While evading the Cranks, Brenda is bitten and infected. The two eventually reunite with the group and Jorge, who beats Marcus, a Right Arm rebel secretly working for WCKD, into revealing the Right Arm's location. The group presses on and eventually reaches a roadblock, where snipers ambush them. However, two rebels, Harriet and Sonya, recognize Aris from their maze and prompt them to stand down. The Gladers, along with Brenda, Jorge, and Aris, are escorted to the Right Arm's mountain outpost, where other Immunes have taken refuge. Vince, the Right Arm's leader, threatens to shoot Brenda after seeing her bite but is stopped by Mary Cooper, a former WCKD scientist. Mary reveals that Thomas, having grown disillusioned with WCKD, served as their informant and aided the Right Arm in dismantling WCKD's major operations.

Mary temporarily halts Brenda's infection with an enzyme and explains that the enzyme must be harvested from an Immune rather than synthesized. She reveals that disagreements with Paige over the cure's production led to her departure from WCKD. Teresa, still trusting WCKD's intentions, secretly transmits the camp's location to WCKD forces, who launch an attack.

The soldiers quickly overpower the rebels and round up the survivors before Paige and Janson, with the exception of Thomas, Jorge, and Brenda. Teresa reveals she has recovered her memories at Janson's facility and now supports WCKD's goals. Janson shoots and kills Mary, and WCKD captures several Immunes, including Minho, Aris, and Sonya, before Jorge creates a distraction that allows Thomas to detonate a bomb, scattering WCKD's forces and allowing the Right Arm to drive them off. With only a handful of survivors remaining, Thomas resolves to take the fight to WCKD, kill Paige, and rescue the captured Immunes.

== Cast ==
- Dylan O'Brien as Thomas
- Kaya Scodelario as Teresa
- Thomas Brodie-Sangster as Newt
- Dexter Darden as Frypan
- Nathalie Emmanuel as Harriet
- Giancarlo Esposito as Jorge
- Rosa Salazar as Brenda
- Alexander Flores as Winston
- Aidan Gillen as Janson
- Ki Hong Lee as Minho
- Jacob Lofland as Aris
- Katherine McNamara as Sonya
- Barry Pepper as Vince
- Lili Taylor as Mary Cooper
- Alan Tudyk as Marcus (credited as Blondie)
- Patricia Clarkson as Ava Paige

== Production ==
=== Pre-production ===
On October 13, 2013, almost a year before The Maze Runner's release, it was reported that Fox had started work on The Scorch Trials. It was revealed that T. S. Nowlin – who had recently worked on the Fantastic Four reboot – would adapt Maze Runner: The Scorch Trials, taking over from Noah Oppenheim, with returning director Wes Ball supervising Nowlin's script.

The early development of Maze Runner: The Scorch Trials suggested to many that Fox was confident in the potential success of The Maze Runner. On November 19, 2014, John Paesano was confirmed to return to score the film. Creature designer Ken Barthelmey returned to design the "Cranks" for the film.

=== Casting ===
On September 26, 2014, Aidan Gillen was cast as Janson, also known as Rat-Man. On September 30, 2014, Rosa Salazar signed on to the cast as Brenda. Within the next few days, Mud star Jacob Lofland and Giancarlo Esposito joined the cast, playing Aris Jones and Jorge, respectively. Nathalie Emmanuel was cast as Harriet, co-leader of Group B, on October 22, 2014, and Katherine McNamara as the other co-leader on December 22. On November 3, 2014, there were two additions to the cast, with Lili Taylor as Mary Cooper, a "doctor who helps Thomas and the Gladers", and Barry Pepper as Vince, "a survivalist who is one of the last remaining soldiers of a legendary unit called the Right Arm".

=== Filming ===
On July 25, 2014, Ball announced at San Diego Comic-Con that the studio wanted to start shooting in fall 2014, should its predecessor become a success when it hit theaters.

On August 31, 2014, Ball announced they were "about nine weeks out from shooting". He also revealed "we are in New Mexico right now. We've got a crew and stages. We are rapidly approaching our shoot time. The sets are being built. A lot of the same crew is coming back. Most of the cast is coming back, except for the ones who were killed [in the first film]. The script is coming along". A week later, Ball told BuzzFeed that "we've got stages, we've got crews coming in, Dylan [O'Brien] will be back in a few weeks, we're building sets, and the script is being written. It's a bit of a race this time because we're cautiously optimistic, but we're feeling excited we're about to do something that's way more sophisticated, way more grown-up, and set up a saga here."

Principal photography commenced on October 27, 2014, in and around Albuquerque, New Mexico. Filming finished on January 27, 2015, lasting 94 days.

=== Soundtrack ===
Composed by John Paesano, the soundtrack was released on September 11, 2015.

== Release ==
On August 31, 2014, Ball revealed he is hoping "the movie will be out in about a year". On September 21, 2014, it was announced the film would be released on September 18, 2015, in the United States. The film was released in Barco's multi-screen immersive movie format Barco Escape in across 25 countries with approximately 20 minutes of the film converted into the format. It was also released in the Dolby Vision format in Dolby Cinema in North America.

=== Marketing ===
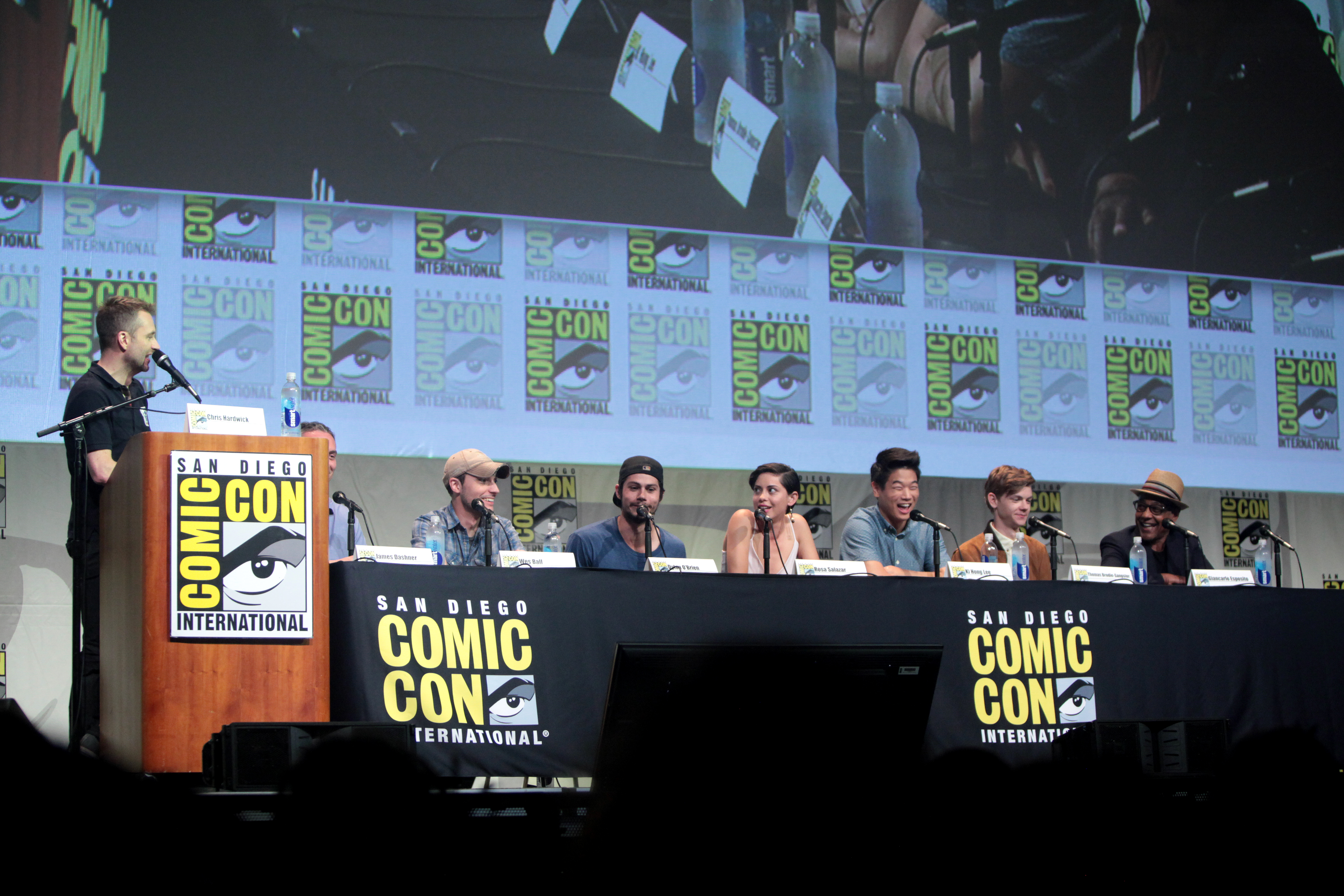
The cast and crew of Maze Runner: The Scorch Trials at the 2015 San Diego Comic-Con.

At San Diego Comic-Con in 2014, Ball released the first piece of concept art for the film. Six stills were released on March 11, 2015.

The first official trailer was released on April 23, 2015, at 20th Century Fox's CinemaCon. It was not released online at the same time, but the 1 minute and 44-second teaser trailer premiered before Pitch Perfect 2 in May 2015. The trailer was released publicly on May 19, 2015. On July 10, 2015, a 30-minute sneak peek was screened at San Diego Comic Con, with Ball, Dashner, and O'Brien also at the screening.

=== Home media ===
The Scorch Trials was released on Blu-ray and DVD on December 4, 2015. It earned $26 million in home media sales.

== Reception ==
=== Box office ===
Maze Runner: The Scorch Trials grossed $81.7 million in North America and $231 million in other territories for a worldwide total of $312 million, against a budget of $61 million.

==== North America ====
In the United States and Canada, the film was released alongside Black Mass and Captive, and was projected to gross $34–36 million in its opening weekend. It made $1.7 million from its late night screenings—55% ahead of the first film's $1.1 million—from 2,900 theaters and an estimated $11 million on its opening day, which is lower than its predecessor's opening day. It finished off the weekend with $30.3 million from 3,796 theaters, which is lower than its predecessor's $32.5 million (−7%) opening in 2014. Nevertheless, the film opened at No. 1 at the box office ahead of its competitor Black Mass. Premium large formats comprised $2.75 million (9%) of the opening gross from 270 PLF screens, while Cinemark XD contributed $825,000 of that figure in 87 screens. The film relied on younger audiences, with 65 percent of the audience under the age of 25 and women making up 53 percent of ticket buyers. Also noteworthy was that Fox did not release the film in IMAX format as it had with the first installment, as all IMAX screens at the time were devoted to Everest, which was receiving a week-long "sneak preview" release in IMAX and large-format screens. But Fox did release the film on 270 PLF screens, which made up 9% of its overall gross. Deadline Hollywood reported that Fox was nevertheless happy with the result. The franchise followed a similar box-office trajectory as The Divergent Series, which dipped slightly from its first installment ($54.6 million) to second ($52.2 million). Still, both the movies proved "the consistency of the young-adult audience," said Paul Dergarabedian, Rentrak's senior analyst. "They're not growing at a huge rate, but we're also not seeing a massive drop-off." In its second weekend, the film's box office revenues fell by 53% to $14 million, slipping to third place behind Hotel Transylvania 2 ($47.5 million) and The Intern ($18.2 million). In comparison, The Maze Runner dropped 46% in its second weekend. The Scorch Trials's 10-day gross stood at $51.69 million in relation to its predecessor's $57.9 million 10-day gross.

==== Outside North America ====
Internationally, The Scorch Trials was released in a total of 76 countries. It was released overseas a week before it opened in the U.S., and earned $26.7 million in its opening weekend from 21 markets in 5,586 screens and in all markets, outperforming its predecessor. It debuted at second place at the international box office, behind Mission: Impossible – Rogue Nation. In its second weekend, it expanded to 41 additional markets and earned a total of $43.2 million from 12,699 screens in 66 markets, opening at No. 1 in 34 of the 41 markets as well as topping the international box office charts. In South Korea, it had the biggest opening for Fox of 2015 with $7.2 million from 804 screens. That's 41% higher than its predecessor's opening. France posted the highest opening for the film with $8.5 million followed by South Korea ($7.2 million) Russia and the CIS ($5.2 million), the United Kingdom, Ireland and Malta ($4.9 million), and Mexico ($4.4 million). In terms of total earning, its largest market outside of the U.S. are France ($25 million), South Korea ($19 million) and the United Kingdom ($13.2 million). It opened in China—its last market—on November 4 and grossed an estimated $19.77 million on 4,945 screens in its five opening weekend ($14.6 million over three days) which is 60% above its predecessor's opening. It has grossed a total of $29.5 million in China making it the biggest market for the film, followed by France ($25.3 million) and South Korea ($19 million).

=== Critical response ===
Maze Runner: The Scorch Trials received mixed reviews from critics. On review aggregator website Rotten Tomatoes, the film has an approval rating of 47%, based on 153 reviews, with an average rating of 5.41/10. The website's critical consensus states, "Maze Runner: The Scorch Trials is an action-packed sequel at the cost of story, urgency, and mystery that the original offered." Metacritic gives the film a score of 43 out of 100, based on 29 critics, indicating "mixed or average reviews". Audiences surveyed by CinemaScore gave the film a grade of "B+" on an A+ to F scale.

The main criticisms of the film were its narrative, particularly its changes from the source material, and lack of character development. Forbes said the film suffered from "middle movie syndrome", claiming that it did not offer an introduction nor a finale. The Wrap stated that, "it doesn't offer much plot or character development". Stephen Kelly of Total Film said, "Scorch Trials ambitiously opens up its world with mixed results: gripping action, so-so script." Walter Addiego of the San Francisco Chronicle said, "there's lots of eye candy, and the pace is fast, but somehow the movie falls short."

Some critics reviewed the movie positively, highlighting its action sequences and performances. John Williams of The New York Times wrote, "the many chases and ludicrous narrow escapes offer respectable doses of adrenaline", and Brian Truitt of USA Today said, "Maze Runner's action, suspense and twists give movie fans of all ages a chance to embrace their inner on-the-run teenager." Rafer Guzman of Newsday said, "the teen dystopian franchise continues to play rough, and now even rougher, with satisfying results." Bilge Ebiri of Vulture said "essentially, The Scorch Trials makes up for the humdrum Apocalypse of its first half by going a little bonkers in its second."

=== Accolades ===
List of awards and nominations
Year	Award	Category	Recipients	Result
2016	People's Choice Awards	Favorite Action Movie	Maze Runner: The Scorch Trials	Nominated
2016	People's Choice Awards	Favorite Sci-Fi/Fantasy Movie	Maze Runner: The Scorch Trials	Nominated
2016	Teen Choice Awards	Choice Movie – Action/Adventure	Maze Runner: The Scorch Trials	Nominated
2016	Teen Choice Awards	Choice Movie Actor: Action/Adventure	Dylan O'Brien	Won
2016	Teen Choice Awards	Choice Movie Actress: Action/Adventure	Kaya Scodelario	Nominated
2016	Teen Choice Awards	Choice Movie Chemistry	Dylan O'Brien & Thomas Brodie-Sangster	Won
2016	Teen Choice Awards	Choice Movie Villain	Aidan Gillen	Nominated

== Sequel ==
In March 2015, it was confirmed that Nowlin, who co-wrote the first and wrote the second film, would adapt the third book, The Death Cure. Ball stated that, if he returned to direct, the film would not be split into two films. On September 16, 2015, it was confirmed that Ball would return.

Filming was scheduled to start in Vancouver, British Columbia, Canada on March 14, 2016. Following lead Dylan O'Brien's severe accident on set, it was later rescheduled to film between March and June 2017 in South Africa for a January 26, 2018 release.
