= Dylan O'Brien =

American actor (born 1991)

- O'Brien in 2026
- Born: Dylan Rhodes O'Brien; August 26, 1991 (age 35); New York City, U.S.
- Occupation: Actor
- Years active: 2011–present

Dylan Rhodes O'Brien (born August 26, 1991) is an American actor. His first major role was as Stiles Stilinski in the MTV supernatural series Teen Wolf (2011–2017). He achieved further prominence for his lead role in the science fiction Maze Runner trilogy (2014–2018), which led to more film appearances.

O'Brien played Deepwater Horizon explosion survivor Caleb Holloway in the disaster film Deepwater Horizon (2016), fictional counterterrorist Mitch Rapp in the action thriller American Assassin (2017), and voiced the title character in the Transformers installment Bumblebee (2018). He also played the lead role in the adventure film Love and Monsters (2020) and the horror film Caddo Lake (2024). He received critical acclaim for his lead role in the independent film Twinless (2025).

== Early life and education ==
O'Brien was born in New York City, the son of Lisa (née Rhodes), a former actress who ran an acting school, and Patrick O'Brien, a camera operator. He grew up in Springfield Township, New Jersey, until the age of twelve, when he and his family moved to Hermosa Beach, California. He is of Irish, Italian, English, and Spanish descent. After graduating from Mira Costa High School in 2009, he considered pursuing sports broadcasting and possibly working for the New York Mets.

At 14, O'Brien began posting original videos onto his YouTube channel. In his senior high school year, a local producer and director approached him about working for a web series. While working on the series, O'Brien met an actor who connected him with a manager. O'Brien subsequently changed his plans to attend Syracuse University as a sports broadcasting major to pursue acting.

== Career ==
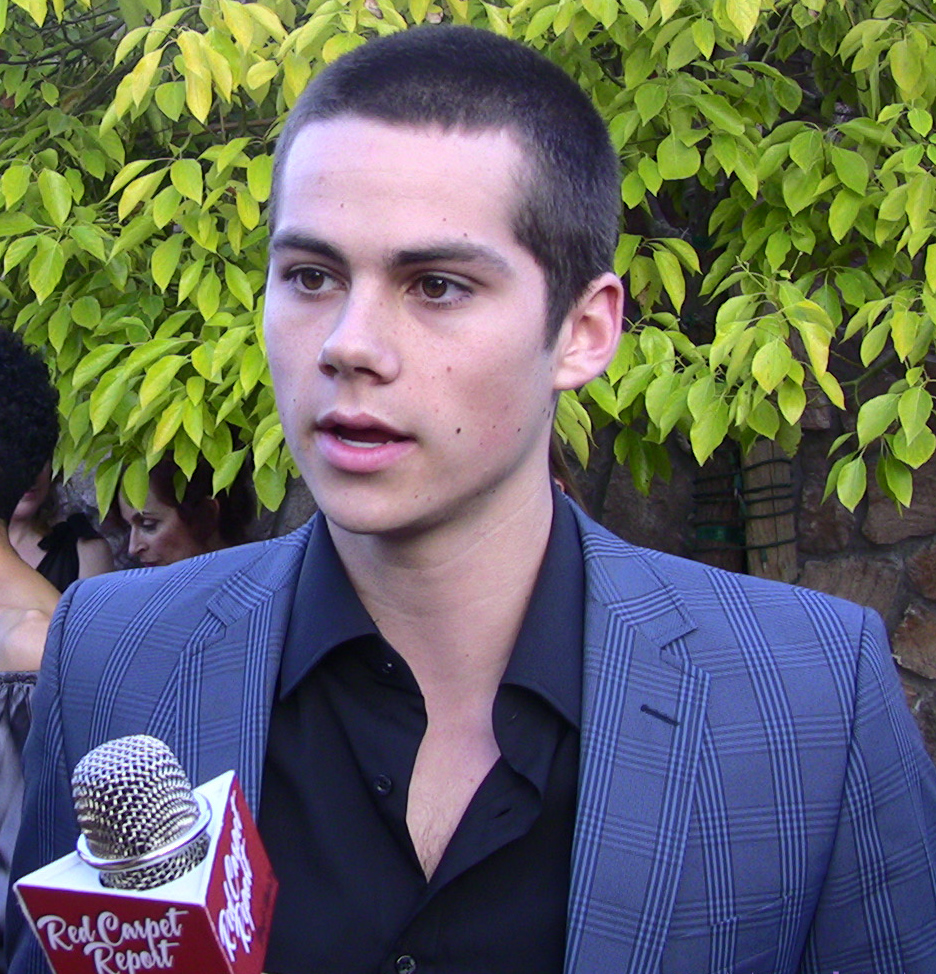
O' Brien at the 37th Saturn Awards (2011)

Before beginning his acting career, O'Brien produced, directed and starred in a number of short comedy films which he released through his personal YouTube channel, "moviekidd826". He was also the drummer for the independent rock band Slow Kids at Play.

O'Brien's acting break came when he landed one of the main roles in MTV's Teen Wolf, a series loosely based on the 1985 film. He was intended to play Scott, but after reading the script, he wanted to audition for the part of Stiles instead. After four auditions, he was cast, and started playing the role in 2010. He received several Teen Choice Awards and a Young Hollywood Award for his work on the series.

In 2011, O'Brien was introduced to audiences in the entirely improvised independent comedy film High Road. The next year, he starred in the romantic comedy The First Time.

In 2013, while on hiatus from Teen Wolf, he co-starred in the comedy film The Internship; and that summer, filmed The Maze Runner (2014), playing the lead role of Thomas. Yahoo! Movies named him as one of the 15 Breakout Stars to Watch for in 2014. He reprised the role of Thomas in Maze Runner: The Scorch Trials, released on September 18, 2015.

In March 2016, O'Brien was seriously injured on set while filming a stunt for Maze Runner: The Death Cure. He was in a harness on top of a moving vehicle when he was unexpectedly pulled off the vehicle and hit by another vehicle. His injuries included facial fractures, a concussion, and brain trauma. He later said that the accident "'broke most of the right side'" of his face; he underwent reconstructive facial surgery. After months of recovery, he eventually began filming other projects, and his March 2017 return to The Death Cure set marked his complete return to health. The film premiered January 26, 2018.

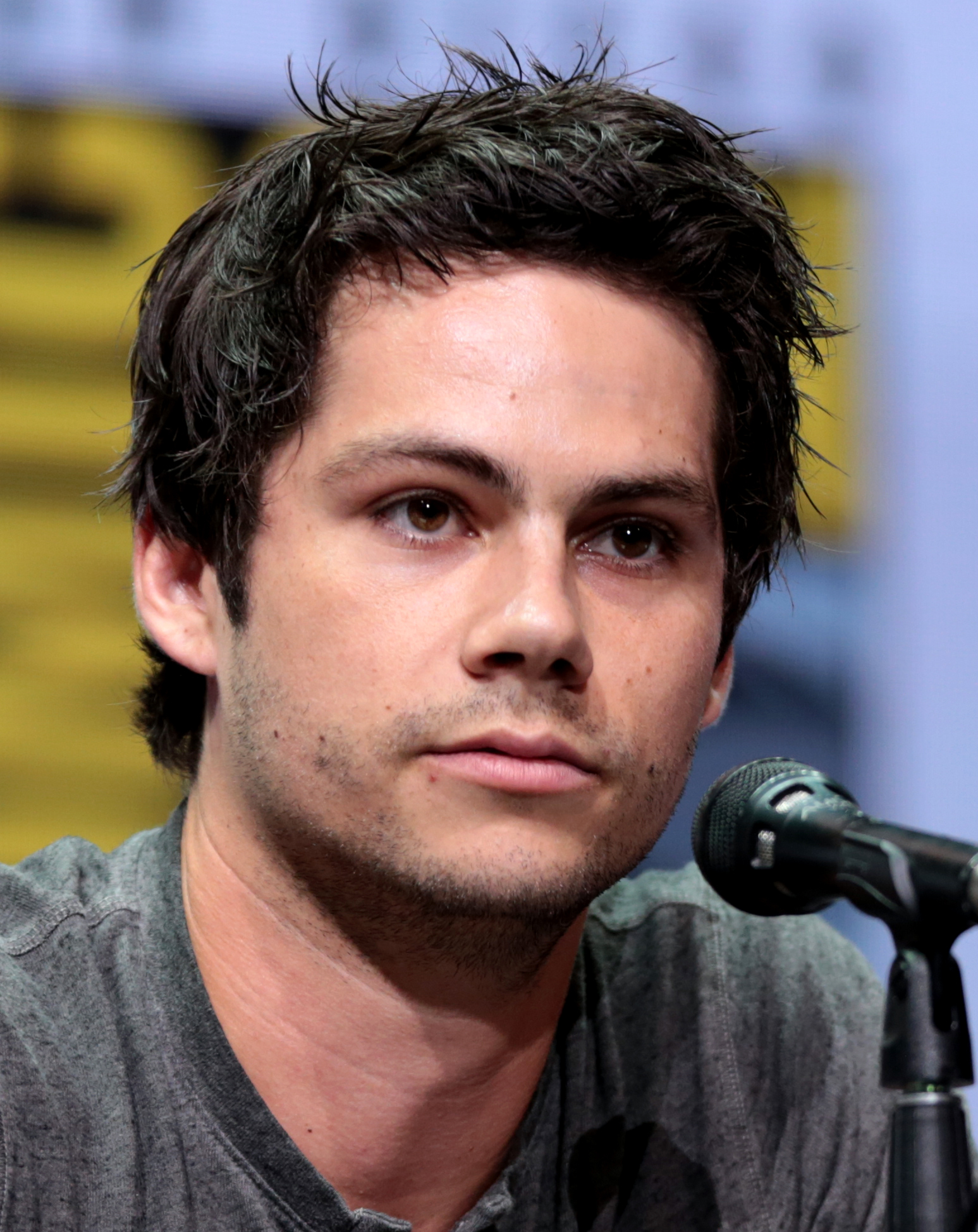
O'Brien at the 2017 San Diego Comic-Con

In 2016, he appeared in the disaster thriller-drama Deepwater Horizon, based on the 2010 Deepwater Horizon explosion. He starred in 2017's American Assassin, an action-thriller where he played titular character Mitch Rapp; and voiced the CGI title character in the Transformers spin-off film Bumblebee in 2018.

In 2019, he guest-starred in the comedy sci-fi anthology series Weird City. In 2020, he starred in the mystery thriller Flashback (filmed in 2018), and the post-apocalyptic road trip film Love and Monsters.

In February 2021, he was cast in The Outfit, for which filming finished in April 2021. In August 2021, he was cast in Not Okay, for which filming finished in September 2021. Also in August, he was cast in Caddo Lake, originally reported by Discussing Film and later confirmed by Deadline Hollywood in October 2021. In October 2021, it was announced he would guest star in season 11 of Curb Your Enthusiasm. On November 12, 2021, O'Brien starred opposite Sadie Sink in Taylor Swift's short film All Too Well. He was credited as a drummer on the track "Snow on the Beach" from Swift's tenth studio album, Midnights (2022). He then appeared as Dan Aykroyd in Saturday Night and in the psychological black comedy Twinless directed by James Sweeney. Twinless had its world premiere at the 2025 Sundance Film Festival, where it won the Audience Award – U.S. Dramatic and O'Brien won a Special Jury Award for Acting for his performance.

In 2026, he starred in Sam Raimi's survival horror film Send Help, released in January. Also in 2026, he was scheduled to star in Sian Heder's biographical drama Being Heumann.

== Filmography ==
=== Film ===
Key
†	Denotes films that have not yet been released

Year	Title	Role	Notes	Ref.
2011	Charlie Brown: Blockhead's Revenge	Charlie Brown	Short film	
2011	High Road	Jimmy		
2012	The First Time	Dave Hodgman		
2013	The Internship	Stuart Twombly		
2014	The Maze Runner	Thomas		
2015	Maze Runner: The Scorch Trials	Thomas		
2016	Deepwater Horizon	Caleb Holloway		
2017	American Assassin	Mitch Rapp		
2018	Bumblebee	Bumblebee (voice)		
2018	Maze Runner: The Death Cure	Thomas		
2020	Flashback	Fredrick Fitzell		
2020	Love and Monsters	Joel Dawson		
2021	Infinite	Heinrich Treadway		
2021	All Too Well: The Short Film	Him	Short film	
2022	The Outfit	Richie Boyle		
2022	Not Okay	Colin		
2023	Maximum Truth	Simon		
2024	Ponyboi	Vinnie		
2024	Saturday Night	Dan Aykroyd		
2024	Caddo Lake	Paris Lang		
2025	Twinless	Roman / Rocky	Also executive producer	
2025	Anniversary	Josh Taylor		
2026	Send Help	Bradley Preston		
2026	Being Heumann	Evan White		

=== Television ===
Year	Title	Role	Notes	Ref.
2011–2017	Teen Wolf	Stiles Stilinski	Main role	
2013	First Dates with Toby Harris	Peter	Web series short; episode: "Roommates"	
2013	New Girl	The Guy	Episode: "Virgins"	
2019	Weird City	Stu Maxsome	Episode: "The One"	
2020	Amazing Stories	Sam Taylor	Episode: "The Cellar"	
2021	Curb Your Enthusiasm	Himself	Episode: "Angel Muffin"	
2023	The Other Two	Himself	Episode: "Cary Becomes Somewhat of a Name"	
2024	Fantasmas	Dustin	Episode: "The Little Ones"	

== Awards and nominations ==
Award	Year	Category	Nominated work	Result	Ref.
Film Independent Spirit Awards	2026	Best Lead Performance	Twinless	Nominated	
Giffoni Film Festival	2014	Experience Award	—	Honored	
Gotham TV Awards	2025	Outstanding Performance in an Original Film	Caddo Lake	Nominated	
Melty Future Awards	2015	Prix International Masculin	—	Won	
MTV Movie Awards	2015	Best Hero	The Maze Runner	Won	
MTV Movie Awards	2015	Best Fight (shared with Will Poulter)	The Maze Runner	Won	
MTV Movie Awards	2015	Best Scared-As-S**t Performance	The Maze Runner	Nominated	
MTV Movie Awards	2015	Breakthrough Performance	The Maze Runner	Won	
NewNowNext Awards	2014	Best New Film Actor	The Maze Runner	Nominated	
Sundance Film Festival	2025	U.S. Dramatic Special Jury Award for Acting	Twinless	Won	
Teen Choice Awards	2014	Choice TV Villain	Teen Wolf	Won	
Teen Choice Awards	2015	Choice Movie Actor: Action/Adventure	The Maze Runner	Nominated	
Teen Choice Awards	2015	Choice Movie Chemistry (shared with Thomas Brodie-Sangster)	The Maze Runner	Nominated	
Teen Choice Awards	2015	Choice TV: Scene Stealer	Teen Wolf	Won	
Teen Choice Awards	2016	Choice AnTEENcipated Movie Actor	Deepwater Horizon	Won	
Teen Choice Awards	2016	Choice Movie Actor: Action/Adventure	Maze Runner: The Scorch Trials	Won	
Teen Choice Awards	2016	Choice Movie Chemistry (shared with Thomas Brodie-Sangster)	Maze Runner: The Scorch Trials	Won	
Teen Choice Awards	2016	Choice Summer TV Actor	Teen Wolf	Won	
Teen Choice Awards	2017	Choice Sci-Fi/Fantasy TV Actor	Teen Wolf	Won	
Teen Choice Awards	2017	Choice TV Ship (shared with Holland Roden)	Teen Wolf	Nominated	
Teen Choice Awards	2018	Choice Action Movie Actor	Maze Runner: The Death Cure	Nominated	
Teen Choice Awards	2018	Choice Movie Ship (shared with Kaya Scodelario)	Maze Runner: The Death Cure	Nominated	
Variety & Golden Globe's Breakthrough Artist Awards	2024	Breakthrough Award	Ponyboi	Honored	
Young Hollywood Awards	2013	Best Ensemble (shared with Tyler Posey, Crystal Reed, Holland Roden and Tyler Hoechlin)	Teen Wolf	Won	
Young Hollywood Awards	2014	Breakthrough Actor	—	Won	
