= Kaya Scodelario =

British actress (born 1992)

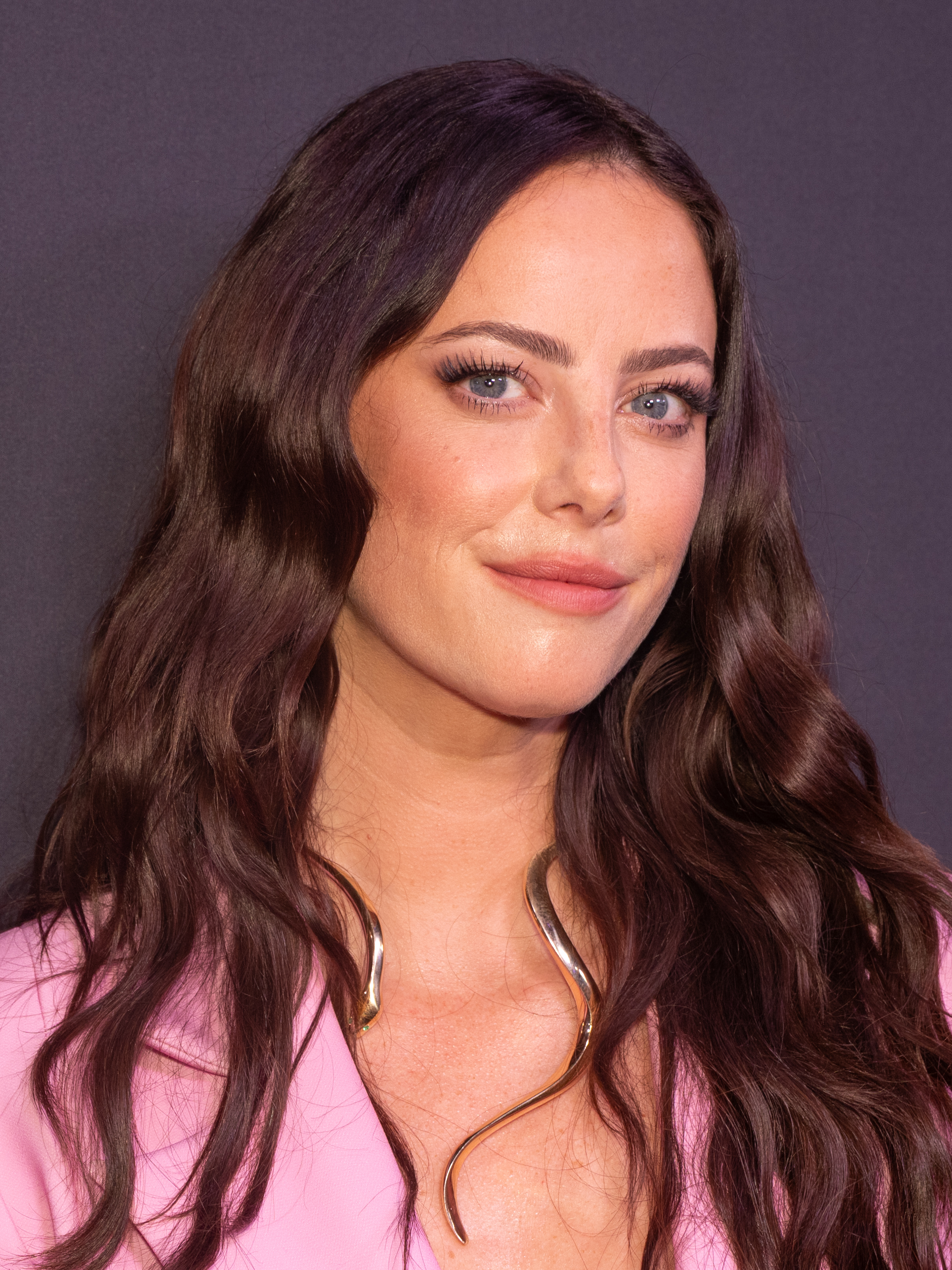
- Scodelario at the 2025 Toronto International Film Festival
- Born: Kaya Rose Humphrey; 13 March 1992 (age 34); Haywards Heath, West Sussex, England
- Occupations: Actress; model
- Years active: 2006–present
- Spouse: Benjamin Walker (m. 2015; div. 2024)
- Children: 2

Kaya Rose Scodelario (born 13 March 1992) is a British actress and model. She first came to prominence co-starring on E4's Skins (2007–2010, 2013), receiving two Golden Nymph nominations for her portrayal of Effy Stonem. She then had leading roles in films including Wuthering Heights (2011), the Maze Runner series (2014–2018), Pirates of the Caribbean: Dead Men Tell No Tales (2017), Crawl (2019), and Resident Evil: Welcome to Raccoon City (2021). In 2024, she starred in the action-comedy series The Gentlemen and limited biographical drama series Senna.

== Early life ==
Scodelario was born Kaya Rose Humphrey on 13 March 1992, in Haywards Heath, West Sussex. Her mother, Katia Scodelario, is a Brazilian who worked as an accountant in Itu, São Paulo, and moved to England in 1990; Scodelario's surname comes from her mother's Italian grandfather. Her father, Roger Humphrey, was Polish-English and died in November 2010.

Her parents divorced when Scodelario was one year old, and her mother took her to London when she was four. They spent their first night on the street before finding a council flat on Holloway Road. Scodelario took her mother's surname and spoke Portuguese at home. She attended St Joseph's Catholic Primary School, Highgate Hill and she attended Bishop Douglass Catholic School and then Islington Arts and Media School. She participated in school plays and found drama an escape from bullying. Her mother took on multiple jobs to make ends meet and had clinical depression that worsened during Scodelario's teen years. Scodelario said she wanted to help, but did not know how, and moved to a flat in Camden.

== Career ==
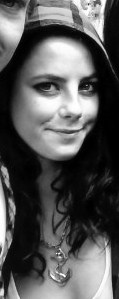
Scodelario in 2009

In 2006, at age 14 and with no acting experience, Scodelario was cast in the first series of Skins as Effy Stonem. At the auditions, she became discouraged as she felt she was too young, but a producer told her to stay and she was asked to read for the part. While Scodelario's role in the first series had minimal speaking lines, her character developed considerably during the second series. She eventually became the central character in the third and fourth series after the cast had been replaced by a new generation of characters. This made Effy one of the only characters to appear from series 1 all the way through to series 4. Filming began in July and Scodelario said that 18 November 2009 was her last day of filming the series and that she would miss being on the show.

Critics praised her performance, and she was nominated twice for Best Actress at the TV Quick Awards, in 2009 and 2010. In the episode "Fire", one of three parts of the seventh (and final) season of Skins, Scodelario reprised the role of Effy. It is a two-part depiction of her life as an adult, lasting two hours. She claims "Fire" is "more like a movie" and that she could relate to Effy's struggle to change from a teenager into an adult.

Scodelario made her film debut in the science fiction-thriller film Moon, which premiered at the 2009 Sundance Film Festival, receiving positive reviews. In her second film, Shank, released on 26 March 2010, she played teenager Tasha. In addition, she appeared in the 2010 remake of Clash of the Titans as Peshet.

In April 2010, Scodelario confirmed her casting as Cathy in an adaptation of Wuthering Heights directed by Andrea Arnold. The film premiered at the Venice Film Festival in 2011 to generally positive reviews, and Scodelario was hailed as a "heart-wrenching revelation". Wuthering Heights also played at several other international film festivals, including the 2011 Toronto International Film Festival, the London Film Festival, and the 2012 Sundance Film Festival.

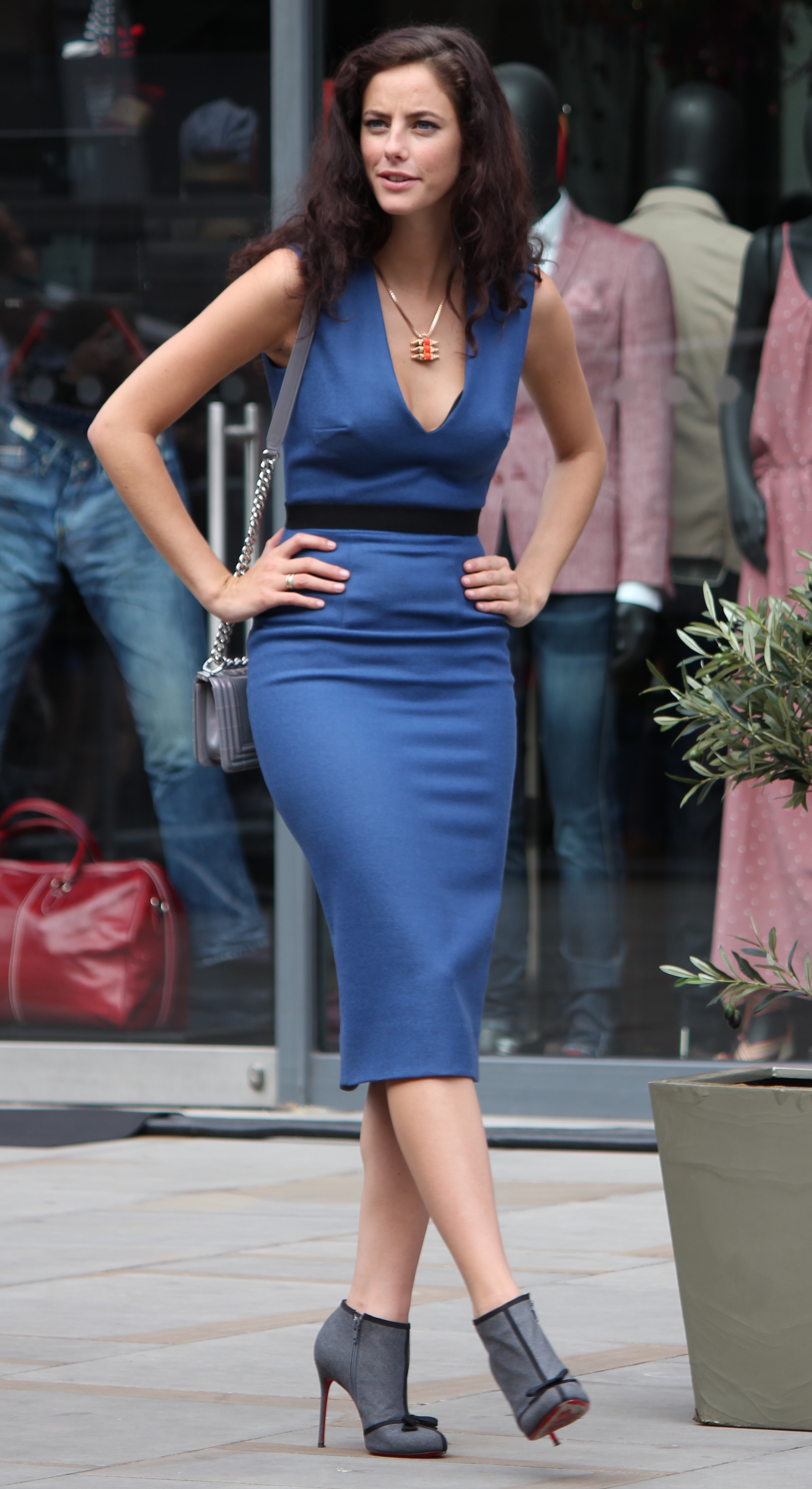
Scodelario in 2012 filming the music video for "Candy" by Robbie Williams

In 2011, she signed on to play Sally Weaver in a British thriller, Twenty8k. The film was released in September 2012. In late June, Scodelario announced that she had signed on to star in Now Is Good with Dakota Fanning. The film is based on Jenny Downham's novel Before I Die, about a teenage girl with leukaemia who makes a list of things to do before she dies. She portrays Zoey, the protagonist's best friend. In September 2011, Scodelario filmed a television serial for BBC One, True Love, an improvised series comprising five stand-alone episodes, each covering a different love-related dilemma. She is cast in the third storyline as Karen, the love interest of her teacher, portrayed by Billie Piper.

In January 2012, Scodelario made her first American film, The Truth About Emanuel, in Los Angeles. She stars as the title character, Emanuel, a troubled 17-year-old girl who babysits her new neighbour Linda's "baby", which is actually a very lifelike doll. It had a limited release on 10 January 2014. In April 2012, Scodelario shot a cameo appearance for the film Spike Island. She also participated in an advertising campaign for Korean jewelry brand J. Estina. In 2013, she starred in the four-part Channel 4 drama series Southcliffe, which tells the story of a fictional English town devastated by a spate of shootings, exploring the tragedy through the eyes of a journalist and those close to the victims.

She signed on to the film franchise The Maze Runner in April 2013 as the lead female character, Teresa, in the first film, based on the novel of the same name by James Dashner. It was released in September 2014, and its sequel, Maze Runner: The Scorch Trials, in September 2015. She filmed the lead role in the film adaptation of The Moon and the Sun in 2014, but the film was not released until 2022, under the title The King's Daughter. She starred in the home-invasion thriller Tiger House, released in 2015, and also had a starring role in the sequel Pirates of the Caribbean: Dead Men Tell No Tales, which was released on 26 May 2017.

Scodelario reprised the role of Teresa in Maze Runner: The Death Cure. The film was set for release on 17 February 2017, but after her co-star Dylan O'Brien was injured on set, it was pushed back to 26 January 2018.

The year 2019 brought new projects for Scodelario. The first, released in May, was Extremely Wicked, Shockingly Evil and Vile, about serial killer Ted Bundy; she portrays his wife, Carole Ann Boone. She played the lead in Alexandre Aja's horror film Crawl, which was released in July to positive reviews. Her next film, 2021's Resident Evil: Welcome to Raccoon City, saw Scodelario lead another horror film, this time portraying video game character Claire Redfield as a main protagonist.

Scodelario then signed up to lead a new Netflix series, an edgy figure skating drama called Spinning Out in 2019. Debuting in early 2020, the series explored multi-person mental illness within a family and its interaction with high-level competitive sports.

In spring 2019, Scodelario became the face of Cartier's new jewelry line, Clash de Cartier, and filmed the latest Agatha Christie miniseries adaptation, The Pale Horse, for Amazon and BBC. In August 2021, Scodelario joined dramedy Don't Make Me Go being developed under Amazon Studios, and filmed This Is Christmas the next summer. Scodelario filmed two series for Netflix in 2023: The Gentlemen, inspired by the Guy Ritchie film of the same name, and Senna, a biographical drama about the Brazilian Formula One driver Ayrton Senna, where she played a fictional, though important character of a reporter called Laura Harrison. In 2025, she starred in the Netflix thriller film The Woman in Cabin 10.

== Personal life ==
Scodelario dated her Skins co-star Jack O'Connell from 2008 to 2009, they remain good friends. She was in a relationship with Elliott Tittensor from late 2009 to early 2014. During their relationship, she supported Tittensor after his arrest for hitting someone while driving an uninsured car.

Scodelario and Benjamin Walker began dating during the filming of The King's Daughter in early 2014, becoming engaged in December 2014 and marrying in December 2015. Their first child, a son, was born in November 2016. Scodelario's Skins co-star Daniel Kaluuya, who grew up in the same neighbourhood as her, is her son's godfather. On 18 September 2021, Scodelario announced she was pregnant with her second child. In December 2021, she gave birth to a daughter. In February 2024, the couple announced they had separated.

She was voted 13th in the UK edition of FHM's 100 World's Sexiest Women 2010.

In January 2018, Scodelario alleged that she had been sexually assaulted when she was 12 years old.

== Filmography ==
=== Film ===
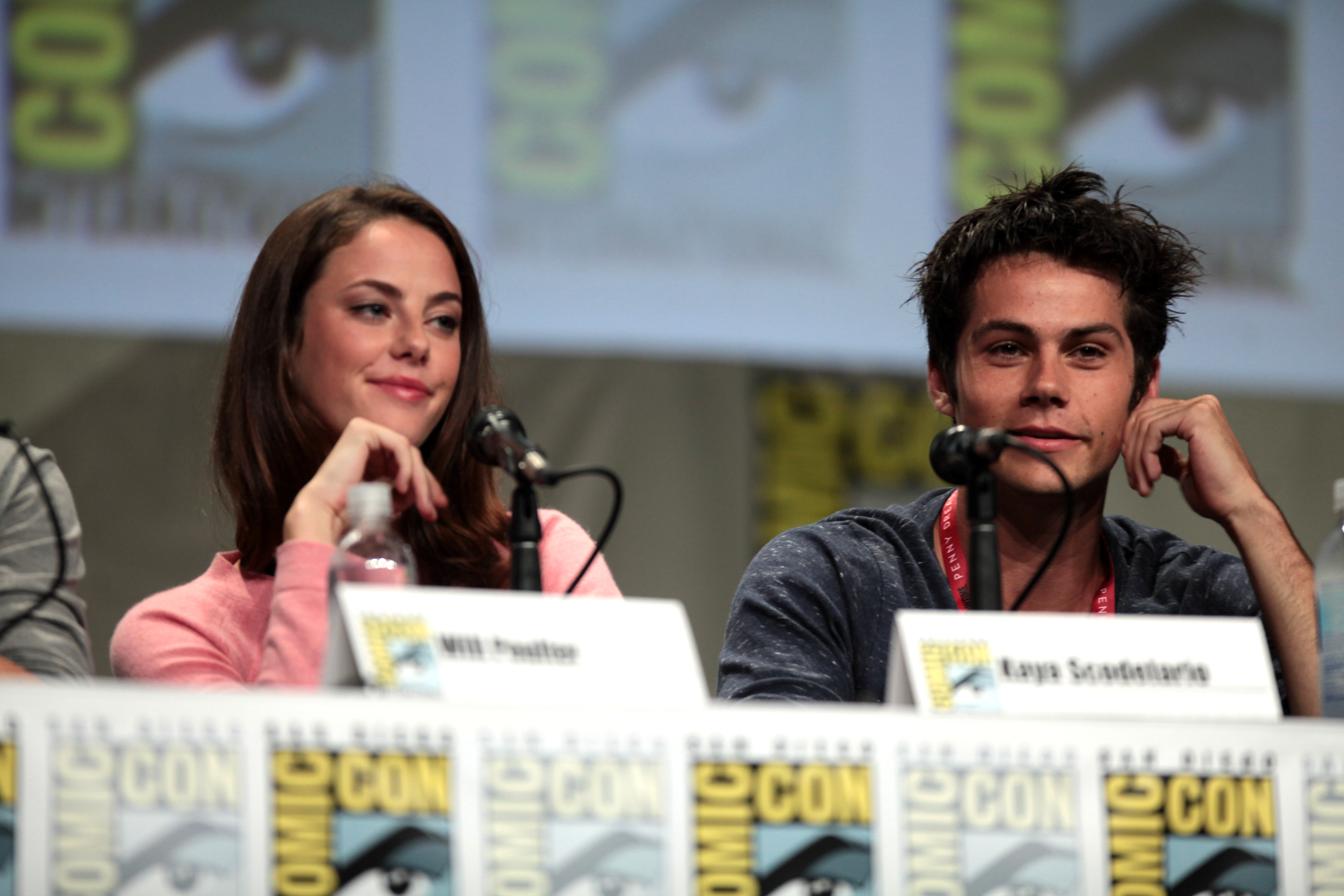
Kaya Scodelario and Dylan O'Brien at a panel for the Maze Runner film at San Diego Comic-Con in July 2014

Year	Title	Role	Notes
2009	Moon	Eve Bell	
2010	Clash of the Titans	Peshet	
2010	Shank	Tasha	
2011	Wuthering Heights	Catherine Earnshaw	
2012	Now Is Good	Zoey Walker	
2012	Twenty8k	Sally Weaver	
2012	Spike Island	T-shirt Vendor	
2013	The Truth About Emanuel	Emanuel	
2013	Walking Stories	Sara Campbell	Also released as a series of eight episodes
2014	The Maze Runner	Teresa	
2014	Tiger House	Kelly	
2015	Maze Runner: The Scorch Trials	Teresa	
2017	Pirates of the Caribbean: Dead Men Tell No Tales	Carina Smyth	
2018	Maze Runner: The Death Cure	Teresa	
2019	Extremely Wicked, Shockingly Evil and Vile	Carole Ann Boone	
2019	Crawl	Haley Keller	
2021	Resident Evil: Welcome to Raccoon City	Claire Redfield	
2022	The King's Daughter	Marie-Joséphe D'Alembert	Filmed in 2014
2022	Don't Make Me Go	Annie	
2022	This Is Christmas	Emma	
2025	Adulthood	Megan	
2025	The Woman in Cabin 10	Grace	

=== Television ===
Year	Title	Role	Notes
2007–2010, 2013	Skins	Effy Stonem	Main role
2012	True Love	Karen	Episodes: "Holly", "Adrian"
2013	Southcliffe	Anna Salter	Miniseries
2020	Spinning Out	Kat Baker	Main role
2020	The Pale Horse	Hermia Easterbrook	Miniseries
2024–present	The Gentlemen	Susie Glass	Main role
2024	Senna	Laura	Main role

=== Music videos ===
Year	Title	Artist
2009	"Stay Too Long"	Plan B
2010	"She Said"	Plan B
2010	"Old Isleworth"	The Ruskins
2010	"Love Goes Down"	Plan B
2011	"Writing's on the Wall"	Plan B
2012	"Candy"	Robbie Williams

== Awards and nominations ==
Year	Award	Category	Work	Result	Ref
2008	Golden Nymph	Outstanding Actress – Drama Series	Skins	Nominated	
2009	TV Quick Awards	Best Actress	Skins	Nominated	
2010	TV Quick Awards	Best Actress	Skins	Nominated	
2010	Golden Nymph	Outstanding Actress – Drama Series	Skins	Nominated	
2012	GLAMOUR Women of the Year Awards	PANDORA Breakthrough	Wuthering Heights	Nominated	
2012	Virgin Media Movie Awards	Next Big Thing 2012	—N/a	Nominated	
2013	Virgin Media Movie Awards	Best Actress	True Love	Nominated	
2013	Ashland Independent Film Award	Best Acting Ensemble: Feature (Note: Shared with Jessica Biel, Alfred Molina, Frances O'Connor, Jimmi Simpson, and Aneurin Barnard)	The Truth About Emanuel	Won	
2014	GLAMOUR Women of the Year Awards	UK TV Actress	Skins / Southcliffe	Nominated	
2015	GLAMOUR Women of the Year Awards	NEXT Breakthrough	The Maze Runner	Nominated	
2015	Teen Choice Awards	Choice Movie Actress: Action	The Maze Runner	Nominated	
2015	Capricho Awards	Best International Actress	The Maze Runner	Nominated	
2016	Teen Choice Awards	Choice Movie Actress: Action	Maze Runner: The Scorch Trials	Nominated	
2017	Teen Choice Awards	Choice Movie Actress: Action	Pirates of the Caribbean: Dead Men Tell No Tales	Nominated	
2018	Teen Choice Awards	Choice Movie Ship (Note: Shared with Dylan O'Brien)	Maze Runner: The Death Cure	Nominated	
2019	National Film & TV Awards	Best Actress	Crawl	Nominated	
2023	Golden Raspberry Awards	Worst Actress	The King's Daughter	Nominated	
2024	Gotham TV Awards	Outstanding Performance in a Comedy Series	The Gentlemen	Nominated	
