= Uli Latukefu =

Australian actor and singer

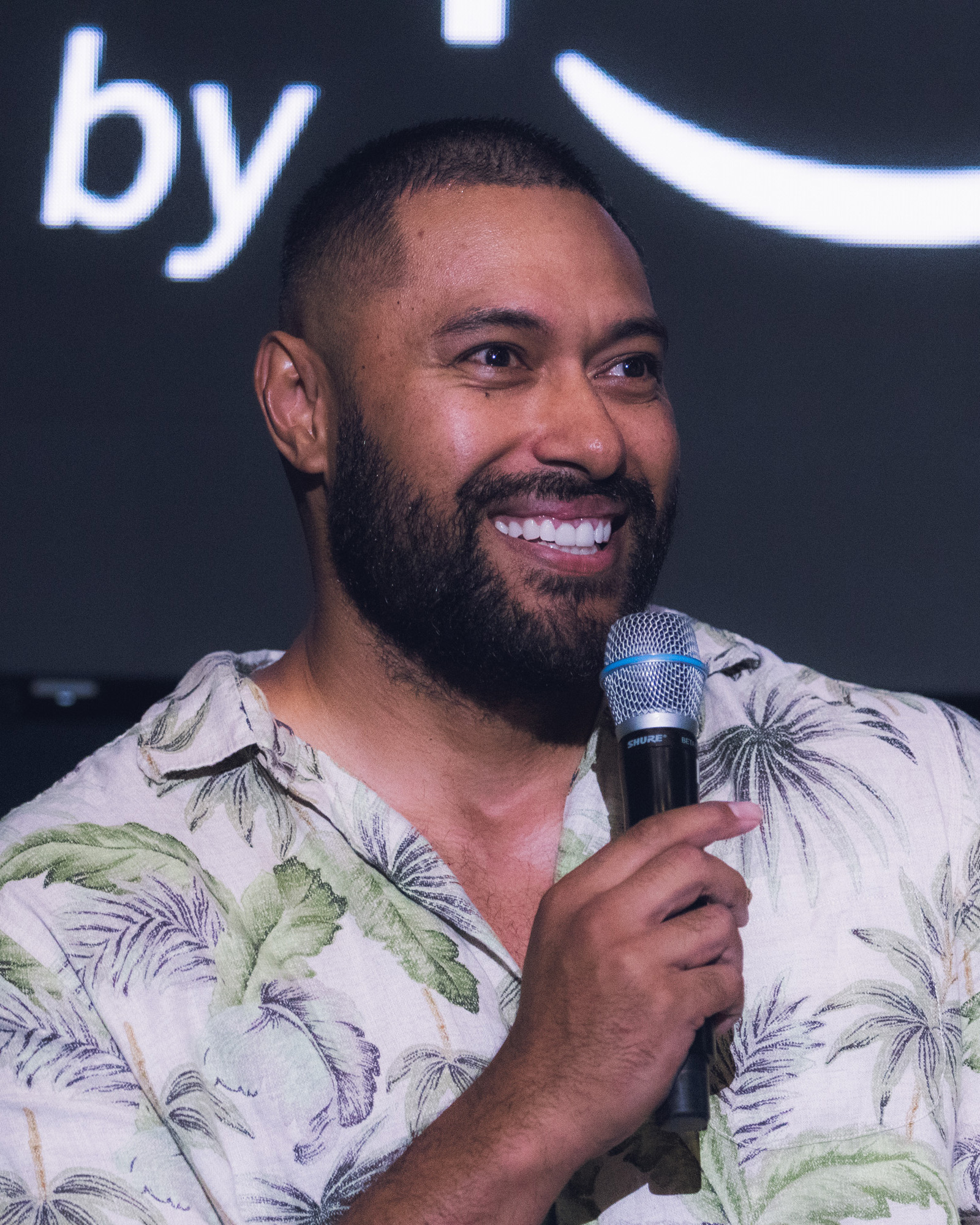
- Latukefu in 2025
- Born: Taliaʻuli Latukefu; Australia
- Occupations: Actor, singer
- Years active: 2013–present
- Known for: Marco Polo (2014–2016); Young Rock (2021–2023)
- Children: 2

Taliaʻuli Latukefu is an Australian actor and singer, best known for his roles as Dwayne Johnson in the NBC comedy Young Rock and Byamba in the American Netflix series Marco Polo. He also played Darren Ngata in the popular Australian dramatic series Doctor Doctor in series 2–4 from 2017 to 2020. He played Cole in the short film Alien: Covenant – Prologue: Last Supper and the feature film Alien: Covenant, both directed by Ridley Scott; Last Supper was released on 22 February 2017, and Covenant on 19 May 2017. He is also known for his role as Father Matteo in the psychological thriller miniseries Devil's Playground and as "Kool Kris" in the Chris Lilley mockumentary series Jonah from Tonga. In 2004, he was a contestant in the reality singing competition series Australian Idol. In 2022, he portrayed the superhero The Champion in the DC Extended Universe (DCEU) film Black Adam. In August 2026, he was reported as having been cast as the villain Ganondorf in the upcoming live action adaptation of The Legend of Zelda.

Of Tongan descent, Latukefu is a graduate of the National Institute of Dramatic Art (NIDA). He lives in Sydney, Australia.

== Filmography ==
Key
†	Denotes works that have not yet been released

=== Film ===
Year	Film	Role	Notes
2017	Alien: Covenant	Cole	
2019	Danger Close: The Battle of Long Tan	Bombardier Ray Ngatai	
2020	The Legend of Baron To'a	Fritz	
2022	Black Adam	Hurut / The Champion	
2023	Red, White & Brass	Maka	
2023	Next Goal Wins	Nicky Salapu	
2024	MaXXXine	Shephard Turei	
2027	The Legend of Zelda †	Ganondorf	Post-production

=== Television ===
Year	Title	Role	Notes
2014	Devil's Playground	Father Matteo	Miniseries
2014	Jonah From Tonga	Kool Kris	
2014–2016	Marco Polo	Byamba	Main role
2017–2019	Doctor Doctor	Darren Ngata	13 episodes
2021–2023	Young Rock	Dwayne Johnson	Portrays older teenaged and young adult Dwayne Johnson in flashbacks
2023–2024	Last King of the Cross	Tongan Sam	16 episodes
2024–	Laid	Lug	American series
2025	The Last Anniversary	Callum	
2025	Countdown	Lucas Finau	Main role; 11 episodes
