= The Wrecking Crew (2026 film) =

- Release poster
- Directed by: Ángel Manuel Soto
- Written by: Jonathan Tropper
- Produced by: Jeffrey Fierson; Jason Momoa; Dave Bautista; Matt Reeves; Lynn Harris
- Starring: Jason Momoa; Dave Bautista; Claes Bang; Temuera Morrison; Jacob Batalon; Frankie Adams; Miyavi; Stephen Root; Morena Baccarin
- Cinematography: Matt Flannery
- Edited by: Mike McCusker
- Music by: Bobby Krlic
- Production companies: 6th & Idaho Productions; Hard J Productions; Reunion Pacific Entertainment
- Distributed by: Amazon MGM Studios (via Prime Video)
- Release dates: January 15, 2026 (Regal Times Square); January 28, 2026 (Prime Video)
- Running time: 122 minutes
- Country: United States
- Language: English

The Wrecking Crew is a 2026 American buddy cop action comedy film directed by Ángel Manuel Soto and written by Jonathan Tropper. It stars Jason Momoa, Dave Bautista, Claes Bang, Temuera Morrison, Jacob Batalon, Frankie Adams, Miyavi, Stephen Root, and Morena Baccarin. Released via Prime Video on January 28, 2026, the films received generally positive reviews from critics.

== Plot ==
Private investigator Walter Hale is killed in an apparent hit and run in Hawaii. His sons, estranged half-brothers US Navy SEAL James and suspended police detective Jonny, are informed of his death. Yakuza thugs attack Jonny at his Oklahoma home, believing that Walter had sent him a package.

Although initially ambivalent about Walter's death due to their estrangement, Jonny heads to Hawaii to attend the funeral and investigate his death. There, he reunites with James, meeting his wife Leila and their children. Their cousin Nani arrives, who works for Governor Peter Mahoe, also a longtime family friend.

The brothers investigate Walter's death separately, converging on his ransacked apartment. They work with Walter's assistant Pika and find plans for a casino and resort hidden in a surfboard. With Nani's help, they discover the casino is to be built on Hawaiian home lands, with the site already home to a small community.

Jonny and James infiltrate a party held at casino developer Marcus Robichaux's house. Jonny discovers that Walter had been hired by both Marcus and his wife Monica to investigate each other, while James encounters yakuza leader Nakamura, whose shell company owns the vehicle involved in Walter's death.

Jonny goes to meet Monica the next day but finds her dead. Believing Marcus to be responsible, he returns to the house to confront him, but is beat up by Marcus' security and locked up in jail. After Jonny is released, the brothers fight each other to settle their differences. Jonny reveals he is motivated to investigate Walter's death because he was unable to solve the murder of his own mother, which he blames on the Syndicate, a local crime group. However, James discloses that he sent Jonny away to save his life from the Syndicate, leading to their estrangement.

Jonny's ex-girlfriend Valentina calls him from Oklahoma, telling him that a package from Walter had arrived there. After she personally delivers the package to Hawaii, they find it contains a flash drive that acts as a security key to a digital wallet owned by Walter before they are attacked by more yakuza. After fighting them off, they discover the digital wallet contains millions of dollars as well as transaction information relating to offshore bank accounts owned by Governor Mahoe.

They conclude that Robichaux, in league with the yakuza, has been bribing the governor. This is to legalize gambling and to give him permission to build a casino on Hawaiian home land. Walter was murdered after he uncovered the plot and sent the flash drive to Jonny.

James and Jonny receive a call from Robichaux, revealing that he has kidnapped Leila and Nani, and demands the flash drive for their lives. James and Jonny assault his house, rescue them, and kill Nakamura and Robichaux. Mahoe is arrested for corruption while the leader of the Syndicate gives Jonny the name of the man who killed his mother in appreciation for dealing with the yakuza; however Jonny burns the paper with the killer's name in a barbecue. Jonny decides to stay in Hawaii with James and they make plans to spend the millions left to them by Walter in the digital wallet.

== Cast ==
- Jason Momoa as Jonny Hale
- Dave Bautista as James Hale
- Claes Bang as Marcus Robichaux
- Temuera Morrison as Governor Peter Mahoe
- Jacob Batalon as Pika
- Frankie Adams as Haunani "Nani" Palakiko
- Miyavi as Nakamura
- Stephen Root as Detective Sergeant Karl Rennert
- Morena Baccarin as Valentina
- Maia Kealoha as Lani
- Lydia Peckham as Monica Robichaux
- Stephen Oyoung as Akihiko
- Mark R. Black as Monty
- David Hekili Kenui Bell as Alekai
- Roimata Fox as Leila Hale
- Branscombe Richmond as Mr. K
- Josua Tuivavalagi as Kai

== Production ==
=== Development ===
The film is produced by Jeffrey Fierson for Metro-Goldwyn-Mayer. It is written by Jonathan Tropper. MGM won a four-way bidding war for the project in 2021 which reportedly came from an original idea from Tropper, Jason Momoa and Dave Bautista. David Leitch was once attached to direct with filming locations scouted in Hawaii, but that iteration of the project fell through due to scheduling commitments with The Fall Guy. In August 2023, Ángel Manuel Soto came onboard to direct.

=== Casting ===
Jason Momoa and Dave Bautista were linked to roles in 2021 prior to a bidding war for the project which was won by MGM. They were confirmed in the roles in August 2023. In August 2024, Claes Bang, Temuera Morrison, Jacob Batalon, Frankie Adams, Miyavi, and Stephen Root joined the cast of the film. In September, Morena Baccarin joined the cast, with Lydia Peckham, Roimata Fox and Branscombe Richmond.

The film was the final acting role of David Hekili Kenui Bell, who died on June 12, 2025. This film marks his only other acting role in a film, as Bell previously made his film debut in the live-action remake of Lilo & Stitch, which starred fellow cast member for this film Maia Kealoha.

=== Filming ===
Principal photography began on October 5, 2024, in Hawaii and New Zealand.

=== Music ===
Bobby Krlic composed the score for the film, making this his second collaboration with Soto, following Blue Beetle.

== Release ==
The Wrecking Crew had its world premiere at the Regal Times Square theater in New York City on January 15, 2026, and was released on Amazon Prime Video on January 28.

=== Critical response ===
On the review aggregator website Rotten Tomatoes, 74% of 70 critics' reviews are positive, with an average rating of 6.1/10. The website's consensus reads: "The Wrecking Crew is as brawny and disarmingly charming as its two leading men, smashing through a thin story with colorful pyrotechnics and a satisfying amount of attitude." On Metacritic, which uses a weighted average, the film holds a score of 67 out of 100 based on 15 critics, indicating "generally favorable" reviews.
