= Maze Runner: The Death Cure =

2018 American science fiction film

- Theatrical release poster
- Directed by: Wes Ball
- Screenplay by: T. S. Nowlin
- Based on: The Death Cure by James Dashner
- Produced by: Ellen Goldsmith-Vein; Wyck Godfrey; Marty Bowen; Joe Hartwick, Jr.; Wes Ball; Lee Stollman
- Starring: Dylan O'Brien; Kaya Scodelario; Thomas Brodie-Sangster; Nathalie Emmanuel; Giancarlo Esposito; Aidan Gillen; Walton Goggins; Ki Hong Lee; Barry Pepper; Will Poulter; Patricia Clarkson
- Cinematography: Gyula Pados
- Edited by: Dan Zimmerman; Paul Harb
- Music by: John Paesano
- Production companies: Gotham Group; Temple Hill Entertainment; Oddball Entertainment
- Distributed by: 20th Century Fox
- Release dates: January 11, 2018 (Seoul); January 26, 2018 (United States)
- Running time: 143 minutes
- Country: United States
- Language: English
- Budget: $62 million
- Box office: $288 million

Maze Runner: The Death Cure (also known simply as The Death Cure) is a 2018 American science fiction film directed by Wes Ball and with a screenplay by T. S. Nowlin, based on the 2011 novel The Death Cure written by James Dashner. It is the sequel to the 2015 film Maze Runner: The Scorch Trials and the third and final installment in the Maze Runner film series. Dylan O'Brien, Kaya Scodelario, Thomas Brodie-Sangster, Patricia Clarkson, Ki Hong Lee, Dexter Darden, Giancarlo Esposito, Aidan Gillen, Barry Pepper, Nathalie Emmanuel, Jacob Lofland, Katherine McNamara, Rosa Salazar, and Will Poulter reprise their roles from the previous films with Walton Goggins joining the cast. In the film, Thomas (O'Brien) leads his group of escaped Gladers on a final, dangerous mission to break into the heavily fortified "Last City" to rescue their captured friend, Minho (Lee), and find a definitive cure for the deadly Flare virus.

Maze Runner: The Death Cure was originally set to be released on February 17, 2017, in the United States by 20th Century Fox, but the studio rescheduled the film's release for January 26, 2018, allowing time for O'Brien to recover from injuries he sustained during filming. The film received mixed reviews from critics with praise for the cast performances, action sequences, and visual effects but criticism for the storyline, screenplay, and character development. The film grossed $288 million worldwide.

== Plot ==
Thomas, Newt, and Frypan, the last of the free "Gladers", join with the Right Arm resistance to retrieve other Immunes from a carriage of a train operated by WCKD, the organization responsible for capturing and experimenting on these immune children, including Aris and Sonya. Aris tells Thomas that Minho, their Glader friend whom World Catastrophe Killzone Department (WCKD) had captured, (Note: As depicted in Maze Runner: The Scorch Trials) was on a different carriage and is headed to the "Last City", WCKD's base of operations.

Against the orders of Vince, the leader of the Right Arm, the three head to the Last City to rescue Minho. WCKD is torturing Minho and several other children in the hope of developing a cure for the virus. The group is attacked by Cranks, humans infected with the Flare. However, Jorge and Brenda join them and save them.

The group makes it to the wall of the Last City, which is heavily fortified. Outside the wall, people are rallying in protest to be let into the city. When WCKD opens fire at the protesters, the group is captured and taken to a hideout by a crew wearing gas masks. One of the members is revealed to be Gally, who was presumed dead. (Note: As depicted in The Maze Runner) He then takes them to meet Lawrence, a rebellion leader, who helps Thomas, Newt, Gally, and Frypan enter the Last City.

Gally takes Thomas and Newt on a city tour and, after spotting Teresa, tells Thomas that he can get them into WCKD headquarters. Newt then shows Thomas that he is infected. Promising to cure him, Thomas and Gally capture Teresa. Disguised as WCKD soldiers, they escort her inside WCKD headquarters and toward the location of the Immunes. Gally looks after the Immune children and stays to find a serum that slows the Flare.

Thomas, Teresa, and Newt go to find Minho but are discovered and chased by Janson. Teresa lets them escape to find Minho before going to do a blood test on Thomas' blood, obtained when she was removing trackers from the Gladers. After delivering the Immune children and the serum to Brenda, Gally returns to WCKD headquarters to find Thomas. Brenda is forced to flee with the Immune children to avoid capture. Thomas and Newt reunite with Minho and escape from the WCKD building. Teresa discovers that Thomas' blood can cure the Flare. She shares her discovery with WCKD's leader, Ava Paige, who agrees they must find Thomas. Brenda and the Immune children escape WCKD with Frypan's help.

Meanwhile, Lawrence rallies his rebels outside the city before sacrificing himself to blow a hole in the wall, allowing his allies and the infected people to storm the city. Gally saves Thomas, Newt, and Minho from WCKD soldiers. While Minho and Gally go to get the serum from Brenda, Thomas gets a pendant from Newt before he passes out. Teresa transmits her voice throughout the city and tells Thomas that his blood can save Newt if he returns to WCKD. Nearly consumed by the Flare, Newt regains consciousness and attacks, then begs Thomas to kill him. When he refuses, Newt fatally stabs himself with his own knife. Thomas returns to the WCKD facility and confronts Paige.

While Paige talks with Thomas, Janson, who is also infected by the Flare, kills her and sedates him. Teresa successfully removes some of his blood. When she hears that Janson is only interested in curing himself and others he deems worthy, Teresa knocks him out and frees Thomas. Thomas then fights with Janson and releases two Cranks, who kill him. With the building on fire, Thomas and Teresa escape to the roof, and she gives him the cure. The rest of the team arrives on a Berg. Teresa helps an injured Thomas on board, but the building collapses, and she falls to her death.

The group escapes with the rest of the Immunes to a safe haven island where the remaining population can live safely and rebuild civilization. Thomas discovers that Newt's pendant has a note in it, asking him to look after everyone and thanking him for being his friend.

== Cast ==
- Dylan O'Brien as Thomas
- Kaya Scodelario as Teresa
- Thomas Brodie-Sangster as Newt
- Dexter Darden as Frypan
- Nathalie Emmanuel as Harriet
- Giancarlo Esposito as Jorge
- Aidan Gillen as Janson
- Walton Goggins as Lawrence
- Ki Hong Lee as Minho
- Jacob Lofland as Aris
- Katherine McNamara as Sonya
- Barry Pepper as Vince
- Will Poulter as Gally
- Rosa Salazar as Brenda
- Patricia Clarkson as Ava Paige
- Dylan Smith as Jasper

== Production ==
=== Development ===
In March 2015, it was confirmed that T. S. Nowlin, who co-wrote the first and wrote the second film, would adapt Maze Runner: The Death Cure. On September 16, 2015, it was confirmed that Ball would return to direct the final film.

=== Filming ===
Principal photography began on March 14, 2016, in Vancouver, British Columbia. Previously it was revealed at San Diego Comic-Con that filming would begin in February 2016.

On March 18, 2016, it was reported that actor Dylan O'Brien had been hospitalized for injuries sustained on set during filming. James Dashner announced via Twitter that the production had been postponed after the accident. Producers were reported to be "looking to" resume filming around mid-May. According to the Directors Guild of Canada's production list, the film was scheduled to resume filming on May 9, and complete principal photography on July 26. However, on April 29, 2016, production was shut down indefinitely as O'Brien's injuries were revealed to be more serious than previously thought.

Filming resumed on March 6, 2017, in Cape Town, South Africa. In May 2017, it was announced that Walton Goggins would play the part of Lawrence, described as "an unusual and dangerous character who is part-revolutionary, part-anarchist, and a voice for the voiceless people." Principal photography wrapped on June 3, 2017.

=== Visual effects ===
The visual effects were provided by Weta Digital and supervised by Chris White.

== Release ==
The Death Cure was originally scheduled to be released in the United States on February 17, 2017. However, due to O'Brien's injuries, the studio said that it was unlikely that this date was going to be met. On May 27, 2016, 20th Century Fox rescheduled the film for January 12, 2018.

On April 22, 2017, the studio delayed the release date once again, to February 9, 2018, in order to allow more time for post-production; months later, on August 25, the studio moved the release forward two weeks. The film premiered on January 26, 2018, and was released theatrically in IMAX.

=== Home media ===
Maze Runner: The Death Cure was released on Blu-Ray and DVD on April 24, 2018.

== Reception ==
=== Box office ===
Maze Runner: The Death Cure grossed $58 million in the United States and Canada, and $230 million in other territories, for a worldwide total of $288 million, against a production budget of $62 million.

In the United States and Canada, The Death Cure was released alongside the wide expansion of Hostiles, and was expected to gross around $20 million from 3,786 theaters in its opening weekend. The film made $1.5 million from Thursday night previews, in between the $1.1 million made by the first film and $1.7 million by the second, and $8.4 million on its first day. It ended up opening to $24.2 million, down from the previous film but still finishing atop the box office. In its second weekend the film dropped 57% to $10.5 million, finishing second behind Jumanji: Welcome to the Jungle.

A week prior to its North American release, the film debuted in South Korea, Australia and Taiwan, grossing $15.1 million over its opening weekend. During the first two weeks of international release, the film dominated the international box office taking $62.6 and $35.2 million respectively, and outpacing the two previous films.

=== Critical response ===
On review aggregator Rotten Tomatoes, the film has an approval rating of 43% based on 171 reviews, and an average rating of 5.1/10. The website's critical consensus reads, "Maze Runner: The Death Cure may offer closure to fans of the franchise, but for anyone who hasn't already been hooked, this bloated final installment is best left unseen." On Metacritic, the film has a weighted average score of 50 out of 100, based on 38 critics, indicating "mixed or average reviews". Audiences polled by CinemaScore gave the film an average grade of "B+" on an A+ to F scale.

=== Accolades ===
List of awards and nominations
Year	Award	Category	Nominee(s)	Result
2018	Teen Choice Awards	Choice Action Movie	Maze Runner: The Death Cure	Nominated
2018	Teen Choice Awards	Choice Action Movie Actor	Dylan O'Brien	Nominated
2018	Teen Choice Awards	Choice Movie Ship	Dylan O'Brien & Kaya Scodelario	Nominated
2018	Teen Choice Awards	Choice Movie Villain	Aidan Gillen	Nominated

== Reboot ==
Following the acquisition of 21st Century Fox by Disney in March 2019, Disney confirmed in April 2019 at their CinemaCon presentation that new Maze Runner films were in development.

In May 2024, it was announced that a reboot was in development, with Ball returning as a producer and Jack Paglen hired as writer. The new installment was described as "not a redo of the story nor ... a direct sequel to the original trilogy" but "a sort of continuation ... yet also return to the elements that made the first movie connect with its audience".
