= Teen Choice Award for Choice Movie – Action =

Entertainment award category

The following is a list of the Teen Choice Award winners and nominees for Choice Action Movie.

== Winners and nominees ==
=== 2000s ===
Year	Winner	Nominees	Ref.
2003	The Matrix Reloaded	8 Mile; Blue Crush; Bulletproof Monk; Daredevil; Drumline; The Lord of the Rings: The Two Towers; X2: X-Men United	
2004	Harry Potter and the Prisoner of Azkaban	The Day After Tomorrow; Hellboy; Kill Bill: Volume 2; The Lord of the Rings: The Return of the King; The Matrix Revolutions; Troy; Van Helsing	
2005	Star Wars: Episode III – Revenge of the Sith	The Bourne Supremacy; The Hitchhiker's Guide to the Galaxy; Kingdom of Heaven; Lords of Dogtown; Mr. & Mrs. Smith; National Treasure; Sin City	
2006	Pirates of the Caribbean: Dead Man's Chest	King Kong; Mission: Impossible III; Superman Returns; V for Vendetta; X-Men: The Last Stand	
2007	Pirates of the Caribbean: At World's End	300; Fantastic Four: Rise of the Silver Surfer; Spider-Man 3; Transformers	
2008	The Chronicles of Narnia: Prince Caspian	The Forbidden Kingdom; Indiana Jones and the Kingdom of the Crystal Skull; Iron Man; Speed Racer	
2009	X-Men Origins: Wolverine	Fast & Furious; Star Trek; Taken; Terminator Salvation	

=== 2010s ===
Year	Winner	Nominees	Refs.
2010	Sherlock Holmes	G.I. Joe: The Rise of Cobra; Kick-Ass; The Losers; Robin Hood	
2011	Fast Five	Faster; Scott Pilgrim vs. the World; The Tourist; Unstoppable	
2012	Abduction	Act of Valor; Mission: Impossible – Ghost Protocol; Red Tails; Sherlock Holmes: A Game of Shadows	
2013	Iron Man 3	The Bourne Legacy; The Dark Knight Rises; G.I. Joe: Retaliation; Skyfall	
2014	Divergent	Edge of Tomorrow; Godzilla; Maleficent; The Mortal Instruments: City of Bones	
2015	Furious 7	The Divergent Series: Insurgent; Kingsman: The Secret Service; The Maze Runner; San Andreas; Tracers	
2016	Deadpool	The Divergent Series: Allegiant; In the Heart of the Sea; The Jungle Book; Maze Runner: The Scorch Trials; Spectre	
2017	Wonder Woman	The Fate of the Furious; Logan; Pirates of the Caribbean: Dead Men Tell No Tales; Transformers: The Last Knight; XXX: Return of Xander Cage	
2018	Avengers: Infinity War	Justice League; Maze Runner: The Death Cure; Pacific Rim Uprising; Tomb Raider	
2019	Avengers: Endgame	Ant-Man and the Wasp; Bumblebee; Captain Marvel; Men in Black: International; Spider-Man: Into the Spider-Verse	
