= Rosa Salazar =

American actress (born 1985)

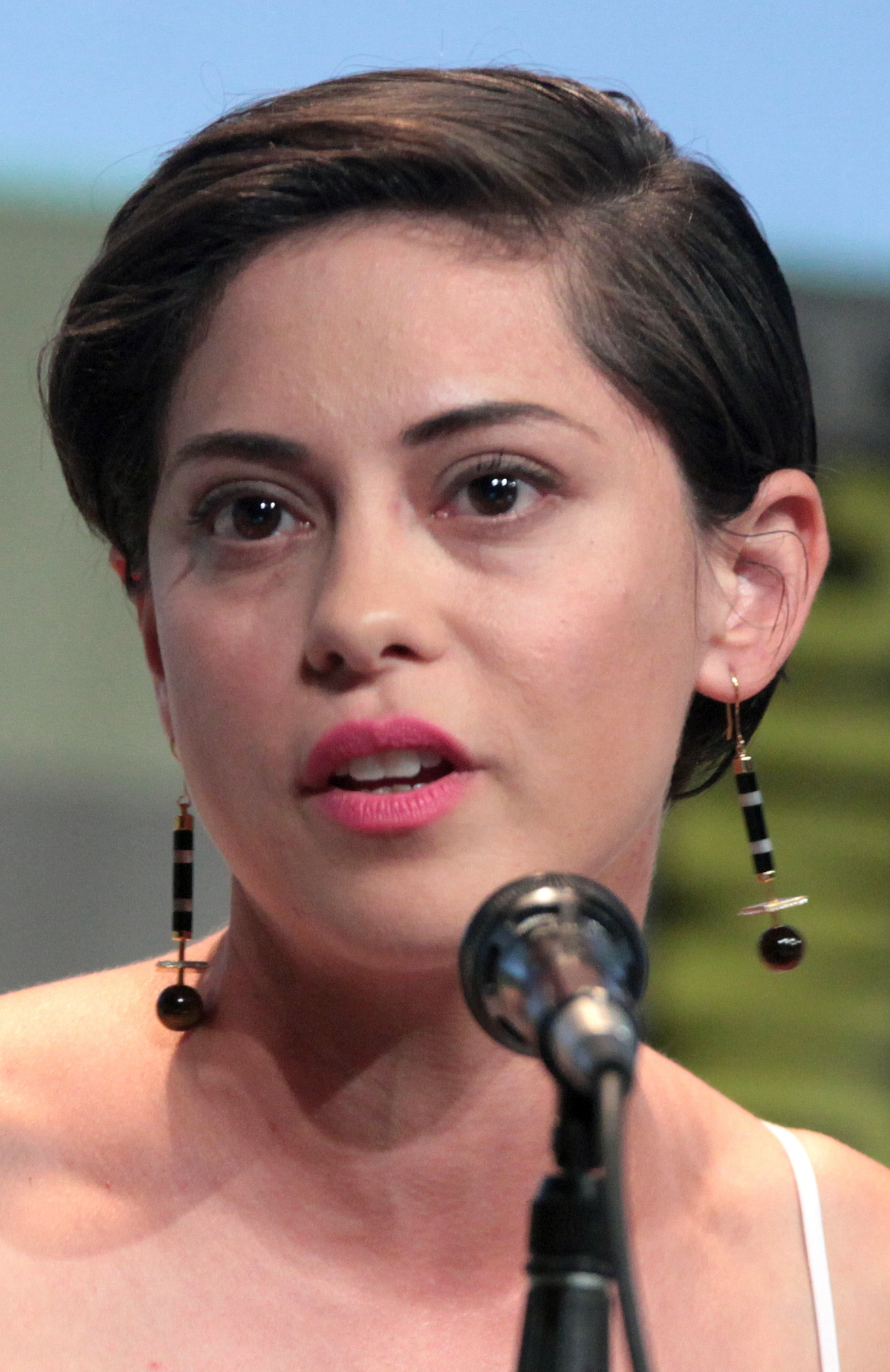
- Salazar at the 2015 San Diego Comic-Con
- Born: July 16, 1985 (age 41); Washington, D.C., U.S.
- Occupation: Actress
- Years active: 2010–present

Rosa Salazar (/ˈsæləzɑːr/; born July 16, 1985) is an American actress. She had roles in the NBC series Parenthood (2011–2012) and the FX anthology series American Horror Story: Murder House (2011). She made her breakthrough as the title character of the film Alita: Battle Angel (2019) and starred in the series Brand New Cherry Flavor (2021), which she also co-produced.

Salazar appeared in The Divergent Series: Insurgent (2015), Maze Runner: The Scorch Trials (2015), and Maze Runner: The Death Cure (2018) and also appeared in the Netflix films The Kindergarten Teacher (2018) and Bird Box (2018). She starred in the Amazon series Undone (2019–2022).

== Early life ==
Salazar was born on July 16, 1985, in Washington, D.C. to Luis and Marilynne Salazar. Her father is Peruvian and her mother is French-Canadian. She grew up in Washington, D.C. and nearby Greenbelt, Maryland. She attended Greenbelt Middle School and Eleanor Roosevelt High School in Greenbelt, where she was active in the theatre program.

== Career ==
Salazar enjoyed entertaining others from the age of fifteen and became serious about becoming an actress after moving to New York City as a young adult. There she appeared in several CollegeHumor sketches. Shortly after relocating to Los Angeles in 2009, she made her film debut playing the character Crystal in Jamesy Boy, written and directed by Trevor White. She then landed recurring roles on two hit TV series: American Horror Story: Murder House and Parenthood. In 2015, she co-starred in various sequels: The Divergent Series: Insurgent as Lynn, and Maze Runner: The Scorch Trials as Brenda.

In 2016, Salazar directed and starred in the short film Good Crazy, a story of a social crusader. It was nominated for a Short Film Grand Jury prize at the Sundance Film Festival.

In 2018, she reprised her role as Brenda in Maze Runner: The Death Cure.

In 2019, she made her major studio lead debut with the film Alita: Battle Angel, an adaptation of the manga Gunnm directed by Robert Rodriguez. It brought Salazar numerous awards, including "Best Visual Effects or Animated Performance" from the Hollywood Critics Association and "Best Voice or Motion Capture Performance" from the Association of Latin Entertainment Critics. That year, it was announced that Salazar would have a main role on the Netflix horror drama miniseries Brand New Cherry Flavor. It was released on August 13, 2021.

In 2023, Salazar was invited to become a member of the Academy of Motion Picture Arts and Sciences.

In 2025, Salazar signed on to CBS series Einstein, but dropped out shortly after.

In 2026, she performed on stage as Helen Ramirez in High Noon.

== Filmography ==
=== Film ===
Year	Title	Role	Notes	Ref.
2013	Epic	Roller derby girl	Voice	
2014	Jamesy Boy	Crystal		
2014	Search Party	Pocahontas		
2015	The Divergent Series: Insurgent	Lynn		
2015	Night Owls	Madeline	Nominated – Hill Country Film Festival Award for Best Actress; Won – Twin Cities Film Fest Breakthrough Achievement Award for Performance	
2015	Maze Runner: The Scorch Trials	Brenda		
2016	Good Crazy	Rosa	Short film; also director and writer Nominated – Sundance Film Festival Short Film Grand Jury Prize	
2016	Submerged	Amanda		
2017	CHiPs	Ava Perez		
2018	Maze Runner: The Death Cure	Brenda		
2018	The Kindergarten Teacher	Becca		
2018	Bird Box	Lucy		
2019	Alita: Battle Angel	Alita	Nominated – Imagen Award for Best Actress - Feature Film	
2020	Pink Skies Ahead	Addie		
2021	No Future	Becca		
2021	Marcel the Shell with Shoes On	Larissa		
2022	Chariot	Maria Deschaines		
2023	A Million Miles Away	Adela Hernandez		
2025	Captain America: Brave New World	Diamondback	Deleted scenes	
2025	Play Dirty	Zen		
2026	Vampires of the Velvet Lounge	Alexis		

=== Television ===
Year	Title	Role	Notes
2010	Old Friends	Dog walker	Web series; episode: "Cleaning Up"
2010–2012	CollegeHumor	Various characters	Web series; 13 episodes
2011	Law & Order: LA	Yolanda	Episode: "Zuma Canyon"
2011	American Horror Story: Murder House	Nurse Maria	4 episodes
2011	Little Brother	Odetta	Television film
2011–2012	Parenthood	Zoe DeHaven	Recurring role (season 3)
2012	Stevie TV	Various characters	Unknown episodes
2012	Car-Jumper	Agent Mindy	Web series short; episode #1.1
2012	Ben and Kate	Molly	Episode: "21st Birthday"
2013	Sketchy		Web series; episode: "Birth Control on the Bottom"
2013	Hello Ladies	Heaven	Episode: "Pool Party"
2013	Boomerang	Olive Chatsworth	Television film
2013	Body of Proof	Ramona Delgado	Episode: "Eye for an Eye"
2013	Nuclear Family	Rebecca	Web series short
2014	The Pro	Jamie Schoonmaker	Unaired pilot
2015	Wrestling Isn't Wrestling	Girl watching GoT	Video documentary short
2015	China, IL	Barb	Voice; episode: "Magical Pet"
2015	Hunt the Truth	Bostwick	Podcast series
2015	Tim & Eric's Bedtime Stories	Lucy	Episode: "Tornado"
2016	Man Seeking Woman	Rosa/Bosa	Recurring role
2016	Comedy Bang! Bang!	Camper	Episode: "Gillian Jacobs Wears a Gray Checkered Suit and a Red Bow Tie"
2017–2019	Big Mouth	Ms. Benitez	Voice; 4 episodes
2019–2022	Undone	Alma Winograd-Diaz	Main role
2019	Star Trek: Short Treks	Captain Lynne Lucero	Episode: "The Trouble with Edward"
2021	B Positive	Adriana	2 episodes
2021	Brand New Cherry Flavor	Lisa Nova	Main role; limited series
2022	Wedding Season	Katie	Main role
2025	Win or Lose	Vanessa	Voice

=== Video games ===
Year	Title	Voice role	Notes
2013	Batman: Arkham Origins	Copperhead / train hostage	Only video game roles
