= Wes Ball =

American film director (born 1980)

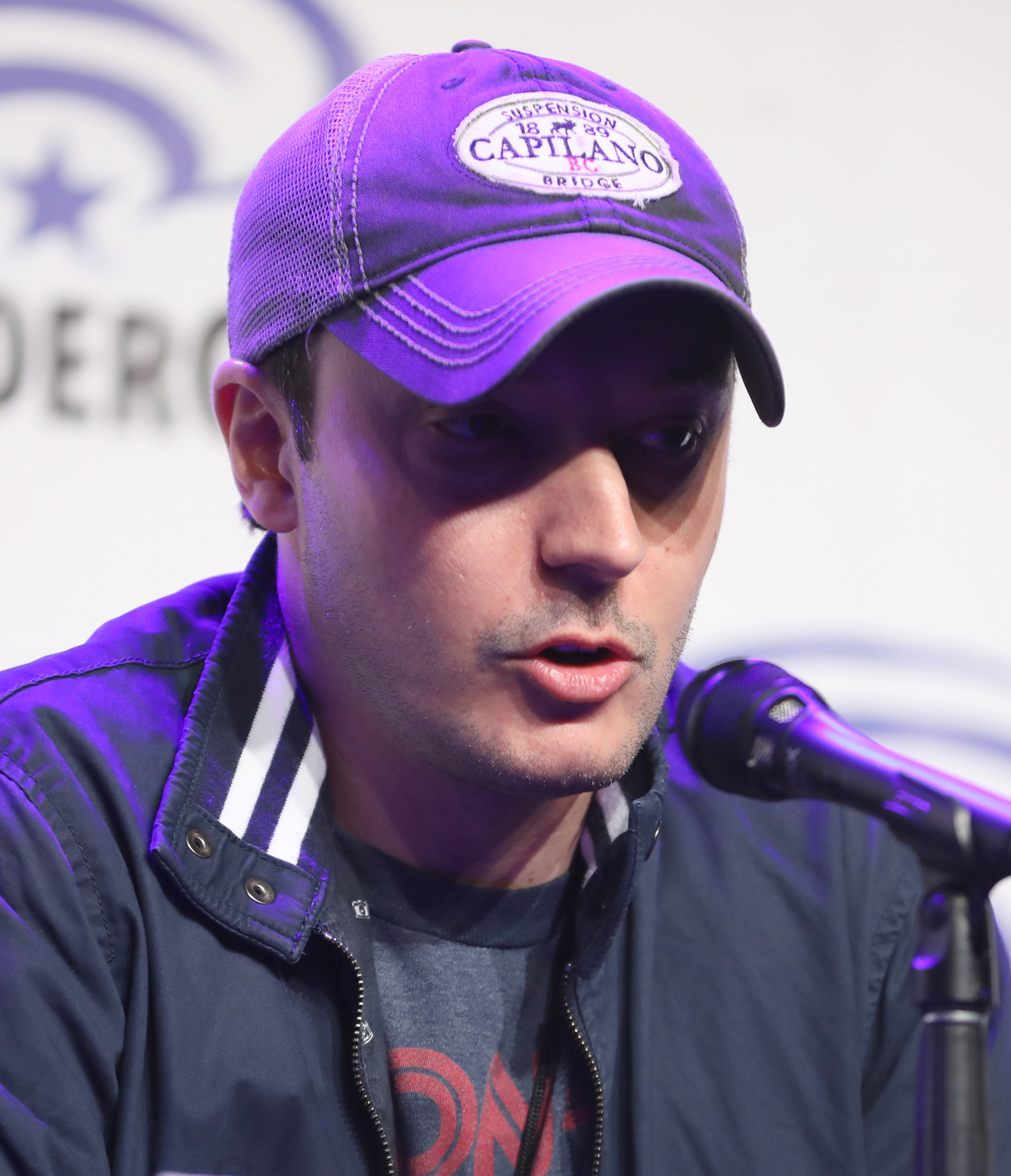
- Ball in 2024
- Born: October 28, 1980 (age 46)
- Education: Florida State University (BFA)
- Occupations: Film director; producer; visual effects artist
- Years active: 2002–present

Wes Ball (born October 28, 1980) is an American film director, producer, and visual effects artist. He directed the Maze Runner trilogy (2014–2018), based on the series of novels by James Dashner, as well as Kingdom of the Planet of the Apes (2024), the fourth film in the Planet of the Apes reboot series.

== Education ==
Ball attended Crescent City High School and graduated in 1999. He graduated from the Florida State University College of Motion Picture Arts with a Bachelor of Fine Arts in 2002. In 2003, he won a Student Academy Award for his short, animated film A Work in Progress.

== Career ==
Ball got his start as a Hollywood filmmaker with an animated short titled Ruin, which executives at 20th Century Fox saw and offered him the job to direct the adaptation to The Maze Runner. The Maze Runner would be Ball's first feature film. Made on a budget of $34 million, the film pulled in $348 million in box office receipts. Not long after the success of the film, Ball signed a first look deal with 20th Century Fox under his OddBall Entertainment banner.

Ball is attached to direct a film adaptation of Fall of Gods, a crowdfunded illustrated novel from Denmark-based Mood Studios.

In 2017, Ball was hired to direct a live-action/VFX-hybrid adaptation of Mouse Guard, at 20th Century Fox with a script by Gary Whitta and T. S. Nowlin, while Matt Reeves, Ross Richie and Stephen Christy served as producers. Production was expected to begin in May 2019, but following the Walt Disney Company's acquisition of Fox earlier that year, the project was pulled from production two weeks before filming began.

In December 2019, Disney and Fox hired Ball to write and direct a new Planet of the Apes film, titled Kingdom of the Planet of the Apes. More recently, his production company OddBall Entertainment moved to Paramount Pictures.

In May 2021, Ball was set to direct The Time Runner, a feature adaptation of the novella of the same name by Michael Sherman. In March 2022, Ball was set to produce a film based on a yet unspecified H. G. Wells book.

In November 2023, it was announced that Ball will direct a live-action film based on The Legend of Zelda for Nintendo and Sony Pictures, with Shigeru Miyamoto and Avi Arad producing.

== Filmography ==
=== Short film ===
Year	Title	Director	Writer
2002	Jacob: The Movie	Yes	Yes
2002	A Work in Progress	Yes	Yes
2011	Ruin	Yes	Yes

=== Feature film ===
Year	Title	Director	Producer
2014	The Maze Runner	Yes	No
2015	Maze Runner: The Scorch Trials	Yes	Executive
2018	Maze Runner: The Death Cure	Yes	Yes
2024	Kingdom of the Planet of the Apes	Yes	Yes
2027	The Legend of Zelda	Yes	Yes

=== Other credits ===
Year	Title	Role	Notes
2005	Magnificent Desolation: Walking on the Moon 3D	Pre-visualization artist	Documentary short
2007	Pirate Master	Graphics artist	1 episode
2008	Medicine for Melancholy	Special thanks	
2011	Beginners	Visual effects artist	
