= American High (company) =

American production and social media company

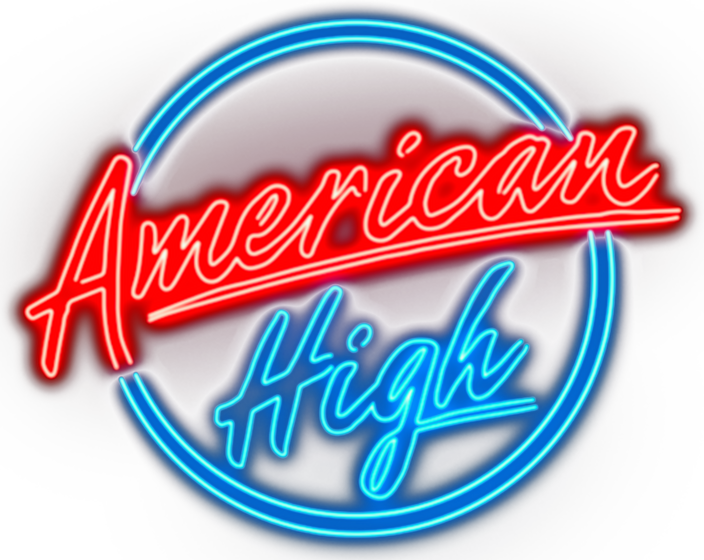
- Industry: Film production; Social media
- Founded: 2017; 9 years ago
- Founder: Jeremy Garelick
- Headquarters: Liverpool, New York, United States
- Website: americanhigh.com

American High is an American production company that produces sketch comedy and low-budget films set in high schools. The company operates in a former high school in Liverpool, New York after a 2017 purchase by Jeremy Garelick. It expanded into posting sketch comedy on social media in 2022, operating as American High Shorts and College Life.

== History ==
To start American High, Garelick purchased the building of the defunct A.V. Zogg School for $1 million in 2017. Before the purchase, the property was owned by a Thai businessman and served as a community church. Because of zoning laws, Garelick had to also provide a trade school in addition to filming. This was pitched to the community as the Liverpool School of Cinema. The event attracted 200 people, with Syracuse.com reporting a positive reception from the audience. Later, the school was renamed the academy at Syracuse Studios. The company attracted initial investment from Mickey Liddell of LD Entertainment. The first two films shot by the company were Holly Slept Over and Banana Split, with $500,000 and $1.2 million budgets respectively. In 2019, American High produced Big Time Adolescence, which started its relationship with Hulu and led to an eight-movie licensing deal. After the November 2022 release of It’s a Wonderful Binge, the Hulu partnership was renewed.

The company is known for producing films with unique protagonists in the setting of an American high school and appointing first-time filmmakers as directors. Seven of the first 11 films by the company were made by first-time filmmakers. Sammi Cohen made their film directorial debut at American High with Crush. According to Syracuse film commissioner Eric Vinal, the local film industry went from a gig economy to having more full time positions because of American High. The company also employs local college students for its productions.

In April 2026, it was announced that American High would work with streaming service Netflix to produce 28 episodes of Minimum Wage, based on their short-form content series of the same name. The series will center around a group of high-school students working part-time at a pizzeria.

== Productions ==
=== Film ===
Year	Title	Director	Writer	Distributor
2020	Holly Slept Over	Joshua Friedlander		Sony Pictures Home Entertainment
2020	Big Time Adolescence	Jason Orley		Hulu
2020	Banana Split	Benjamin Kasulke	Hannah Marks and Joey Power	Vertical Entertainment
2020	Looks That Kill	Kellen Moore		Gravitas Ventures
2020	The Binge	Jeremy Garelick	Jordan VanDina	Hulu
2021	The Ultimate Playlist of Noise	Bennett Lasseter	Mitchell Winkie	Hulu
2021	Plan B	Natalie Morales	Prathi Srinivasan and Joshua Levy	Hulu
2022	Sex Appeal	Talia Osteen	Tate Hanyok	Hulu
2022	Crush	Sammi Cohen	Kristen King and Casey Rackham	Hulu
2022	I Love My Dad	James Morosini		Magnolia Pictures
2022	It's a Wonderful Binge	Jordan VanDina		Hulu
2023	Sid Is Dead	Eli Gonda	Peter Warren (screenplay); Drew Frist and Tom Dolby (novel)	Vertical Entertainment
2023	Miguel Wants to Fight	Oz Rodriguez	Shea Serrano and Jason Concepcion	Hulu
2024	Prom Dates	Kim O. Nguyen	D.J. Mausner	Hulu
2024	Empire Waist	Claire Ayoub		Blue Fox Entertainment
2025	Summer of 69	Jillian Bell	Jillian Bell, Liz Nico, and Jules Byrne	Hulu
2026	Pizza Movie	Nick Kocher & Brian McElhaney		Hulu
2026	Never Change!	Marty Schousboe	John Reynolds (screenplay); John Reynolds and Marty Schousboe (story)	Hulu
2026	Rolling Loud	Jeremy Garelick		Ketchup Entertainment

=== Television ===
Year(s)	Title	Notes	Ref.
2026	Minimum Wage	Created by Jeremy Garelick and Will Phelps. Based on the company’s web series of the same name.	

== Social media ==
In October 2022, Will Phelps, the head of production at American High wanted to expand the company's social media presence with sketch comedy. Prior to this, behind the scenes videos were made on productions with little success. The company invited several comedians, filming sketches for around five days each with them to finalize a long term cast. This process resulted in Aidan and Ryan Micho, Julia DiCesare, and Luke Burke (all with ties to Syracuse University); Hyde Healy, Tommy Armstrong, and Grace Reiter (the latter of whom had amassed 2 million follows on TikTok before American High). Reiter went on to post a viral satire rendition called The Hunger Games (but better) - A Parody of Lion's Gate film adaptation of Suzanne Collins' book The Hunger Games. The production process of the sketches mirrors Saturday Night Live and it has resulted in American High Shorts and College Life, two social media accounts. Filming of social media content continued during the 2023 Hollywood labor disputes, and often uses Syracuse University as a location. New cast members have slowly been brought in for the main American High series, including Pete Flack, Lydia Hynes, and Chelsea Matkins, and older cast members have spent more time on College Life and the Netflix show. In September 2026, Reiter joined Saturday Night Live for its 52nd season.
