= Minimum Wage (TV series) =

American television series

- Genre: Mockumentary; Workplace comedy; Sitcom
- Created by: Jeremy Garelick; Will Phelps
- Based on: Minimum Wage
- Starring: Aidan Micho; Grace Reiter; Hyde Healy; Julia Dicesare; Luke Burke; Ryan Micho; Tommy Armstrong; Randall Park
- Country of origin: United States
- Original language: English
- No. of seasons: 1
- No. of episodes: 14

Production
- Executive producers: Jeremy Garelick; Will Phelps; Axelle Azoulay
- Camera setup: Single-camera
- Running time: 12–20 min
- Production company: American High

Original release
- Network: Netflix
- Release: October 26, 2026 – present

Minimum Wage is an American mockumentary television series created by Jeremy Garelick and Will Phelps, and produced by American High, based on the web series of the same name. It premiered on Netflix on October 26, 2026.

== Premise ==
A group of teenagers on minimum wage struggle to manage a pizzeria named "The Slice Club".

== Cast ==
=== Main ===
- Aidan Micho as Aidan Baldwin, a waiter working the floor at the Slice Club who comes from a wealthy same-sex family.
- Grace Reiter as Grace, the young and overwhelmed manager for the Slice Club, she doesn't have her driver's license but isn't afraid to snap at her weird friends/coworkers.
- Hyde Healy as Hyde Dunbar, a chef at the Slice Club; a classic "jerk with a heart of gold" who acts like a douchebag but has a softer side.
- Julia DiCesare as Julia, a waitress who comes across as a weird, homeschooled kid (because she is) with quirky social habits from growing up without a lot of peer interaction outside of work.
- Luke Burke as Luke Torque, the 20-something-year-old delivery driver for the Slice Club who shows a big-brother protective streak over Julia, and gets involved in a relationship with her mother Judy.
- Ryan Micho as Ryan Parker, the self-appointed assistant manager of the Slice Club, and a bit of an over-eager, "business professional" dweeb.
- Tommy Armstrong as Tommy Armstrong, a stoner working as a chef at the Slice Club. While trying to manage his relationship with his long distance mean girl girlfriend, John.
- Randall Park as Terry Sylvester, the manic founder and CEO of the Slice Club chain actively going through a rough divorce.

=== Guest ===
- Tyler Alvarez as Tyler, an entitled and self-centered, closeted gay member of the Drama Club who bullies Julia. (Episode 2)
- Teala Dunn as Teala, an entitled Drama Club member who bullies Julia and has a crush on Tyler. (Episode 2)
- Isabella Ferreira as Isabella, another entitled Drama Club member who bullies Julia. (Episode 2)
- Darryl Gene Daughtry Jr. as Jeffrey, a man wanting to break up with his girlfriend. (Episode 3)
- Chelsea Matkins as Katherine, Jeffrey's girlfriend who does not want them to break up. (Episode 3)
- Kalissa Persaud as John, Tommy's egocentric, initial girlfriend. Persaud is uncredited for voice-only performance over the phone in "New Year's Eve." (Episode 5 & 14)
- Marito Lopez as Lottery Man, a man who accidentally forgets his lottery tickets at the Slice Club. (Episode 6)
- Aria Garelick as Becky, Mr. Sylvester's niece who is in a Girl Scout troop. (Episode 7)
- Shelby Hightower as Karen, Mr. Sylvester's stepsister-in-law and Becky's mother. (Episode 7)
- Christine Albright-Tufts as Mrs. Dunbar, Hyde's doting mother. (Episode 8)
- Brett Dodenhoff as Brent Dunbar, one of Hyde's narcissistic older brothers. (Episode 8)
- Dunbar Healy as Mr. Dunbar, Hyde's gentle and supportive father. Healy is the real-life father of Hyde Healy. (Episode 8)
- Matt Lopes as Mark Dunbar, one of Hyde's narcissistic older brothers. (Episode 8)
- Lydia Hynes as a Delivery Girl, who delivers pizza to Julia's house. (Episode 9)
- Jordynn Lurie as Chloe Hixon (Episode 11)
- Daniel Li as Dax, Mr. Sylvester's young and muscular body double for a Slice Club commercial. (Episode 12)
- Patty Guggenheim as Mrs. Thomas, a recently widowed history teacher who Hyde hates. (Episode 13)
- Kiel Kennedy as Mr. Albert, a law teacher. (Episode 13)

== Episodes ==
| No. | Title | Directed by | Written by | Original release date |
|---|---|---|---|---|
Part 1
| 1 | "Pilot" | Will Phelps | Jeremy Garelick & Will Phelps | October 26, 2026 |
Luke crashes into a pond while delivering pizzas. At the pizzeria, CEO Terry Sylvester introduces himself to Grace and her staff. Sylvester tells them that their location is the only unprofitable one and is disturbed by numerous health code violations and seemingly incompetent staff; however, he is impressed by the quality of pizza. Despite this, Terry tells them that he plans to close their location. While the staff begs him to reconsider, Terry argues with his ex-wife over the phone, which they overhear. Terry reveals to them that his wife is taking the remaining Slice Club franchises, leaving him only with Grace's. Determined to rejuvenate the restaurant, Terry calls back the customer whose order Luke lost to guarantee delivery within ten minutes, much to his and the staff's excitement.
| 2 | "Drama Club" | Julia DiCesare | Julia DiCesare | October 26, 2026 |
A large party consisting of a local high school's drama club enters Slice Club, frightening the staff. Julia, a theater enthusiast, asks Grace to serve their table. The drama club bullies Julia for interrupting their singing and for her failed audition. Luke reveals to several coworkers that he slept with Julia's mom. The staff becomes overwhelmed by the club's orders, and Grace convinces Luke to tell Julia. Luke protects Julia from being further humiliated by the drama club by threatening to call the police on the club's cast party and kicks them out. Luke consoles Julia by telling her that she is better than the drama club, and asks her to sing. They loudly celebrate, and Luke tells Julia about him and her mom, which excites her. Sylvester suddenly appears, yelling at them as he is trying to sleep.
| 3 | "Breakup" | Julia DiCesare | Julia DiCesare | October 26, 2026 |
Grace and Aidan eavesdrop on a couple's breakup at the pizzeria, and they argue over whose fault it is. The staff speculates on what caused it, with Grace blaming the man and Aidan blaming the woman. Julia and Luke pretend to fix a table to eavesdrop on the couple, but fail to learn anything. Grace and Julia talk to the woman in the restroom, and they learn that she cheated on her boyfriend while he was away on a work trip. Ryan becomes obsessed with cleaning the windows with a squeegee. As he cleans the window, he opens the door, causing a customer's dog to run out and get lost. Annoyed that they were wrong, Grace and Julia tell Luke, Aidan, and Hyde to stop investigating. However, they pressure Julia into revealing what happened. Suddenly, Tommy tells them that he convinced them to stay together. They tell Tommy the circumstances surrounding the breakup, but the couple had already left the restaurant.
| 4 | "Birthday Cake" | Ryan Micho & Aidan Micho | Ryan Micho | October 26, 2026 |
On her birthday, Grace is dismayed that no one at Slice Club seemingly remembers. As part of a tradition of giving surprise birthday gifts to each other, Ryan plans to surprise Grace by jumping out of a cake, which he has been attempting for years. Ryan asks Grace if she replaced the "freezer instigation valve", a fake part he made up to get Grace out of the restaurant. While also investigating the valve, Luke and Tommy get stuck on the roof. Elsewhere, Aidan confuses EMTs for strippers, and invites them to Grace's surprise party. Julia gets startled upon hearing Ryan's voice coming from the cake, and she flees to the roof, also stranding her. Panicked, Ryan begins clawing his way out of the cake. Grace exhausts her search for the valve to the roof, but she drops the ladder, also stranding her. Ryan startles a customer, causing them to begin choking. Unable to physically help, Ryan instructs Hyde to perform CPR. Luke jumps off the roof, and he frees the remaining staff. The EMTs arrive and save the customer. Grace thanks Ryan for his plan, and she declares it the "best birthday ever."
| 5 | "No Phones" | Luke Burke | Luke Burke | October 26, 2026 |
Aidan becomes anxious that he is balding after a customer finds his hair in their pizza. Terry slips on the floor being mopped by Julia, who is distracted on an iPad, and he imposes a no-electronic rule. The staff places their phones into a safe, and Tommy asks Grace for his phone, as he is preparing to break up with his girlfriend, John, over text. Annoyed with their constant bickering, Grace attempts to retrieve his phone but accidentally locks the safe for eight hours after entering too many wrong passcodes. Luke has Julia, who secretly has a crush on Tommy, pretend to be a girl with whom Tommy is on a date. John suddenly arrives, unaware that Tommy was trying to break up with her, as the text never sent. Tommy flees to the back while John antagonizes Julia. The safe's timer unlocks the phone, and Tommy's text sends. Aidan learns that it was Tommy's hair in the pizza, elating him. With Julia's help, Tommy deletes the text from John's phone, as he no longer wants to break up with her.
| 6 | "Lottery Tickets" | Ryan Micho & Grace Reiter | Ryan Micho & Grace Reiter | October 26, 2026 |
Aidan and Grace find a stack of lottery tickets that a customer left behind. Aidan attempts to claim sole ownership of them, but Ryan is hesitant to use them, as everyone (except Luke) is underage. However, they scratch the tickets anyway, and Hyde wins $5000. They collectively decide to purchase a jacuzzi for $4.6k from Facebook Marketplace. The customer calls Slice Club, and Grace fails to trick the customer into believing that they are being robbed to prevent him from retrieving the tickets. The customer arrives and accuses the staff of stealing the tickets after finding residue from the scratchcards. Luke purchases $500 worth of new lottery tickets, giving them to the customer under the guise that they were the original ones. The customer scratches the tickets and loudly celebrates having won the $100,000 jackpot. Terry Sylvester and the staff dejectedly swim in the jacuzzi, which is nonfunctional.
| 7 | "Scouts of America" | Will Phelps | Will Phelps | October 26, 2026 |
Ryan obsessively asks his coworkers to review his application essay for Princeton, which requires a letter of recommendation from Sylvester. Sylvester agrees on the condition that Ryan successfully looks after his niece Becky and her Girl Scout troop. Slice Club's staff get along well with the troop, except for Ryan, whom they constantly antagonize. Angered by their horseplay, Ryan storms off and accidentally destroys his laptop after spilling soda on it, erasing his essay. Ryan has a meltdown and destroys the troop's cookie stand. Becky tearfully apologizes, but Ryan calls her a brat, causing her to run off. Ryan attempts to make garlic knots, Becky's favorite food, and tries to apologize, but finds that she has run away. Sylvester returns, and Ryan discovers that Luke took Becky for a ride in the delivery limo. Becky tells Sylvester that she had fun at the restaurant. Later, Luke gives Ryan a copy of his essay, which he had kept from the previous times Ryan asked him to review it. Sylvester thanks Ryan for watching the kids and tells him to sign his name on the letter before flipping him off.
| 8 | "Restaurant Rules" | Ryan Micho | Ryan Micho | October 26, 2026 |
Sylvester institutes a mandatory policy requiring Slice Club's staff to sing and dance when customers order or tip. Hyde tells the staff his family is coming in today, and he is worried that he will have to perform for his two older brothers who constantly bully him. Grace comes in with a new brow piercing, which appears infected and bloody. Later, the infection causes Grace to develop a fever. Hyde's family arrives, and his brothers go to the back and vandalize the kitchen. Hyde's father tips them $50, forcing the staff to do an eight-minute-long performance. At the end of the day, the staff gives Hyde all of the day's tips, totaling $500. Hyde uses the money to send his brothers to rural Montana for a month and a half.
| 9 | "Sleepover" | Julia DiCesare & Luke Burke | Julia DiCesare & Luke Burke | October 26, 2026 |
Julia invites the staff for a sleepover at her house. They all lie to get out of going, but agree to go after Julia says she has drinks. At the sleepover, the drinks are revealed to be Caprisuns. Luke, wearing nothing but a towel, appears, as he is living there since he began sleeping with Julia's mom. He asks Julia about Rascal, her pet tarantula, which panics everyone. Grace goes into the restroom, where she is startled by Rascal and stomps on him, accidentally killing him. Julia takes the staff to her "classroom", where she has been taught nonsensical alternative history. The staff tells Julia to play hide-and-seek, and Grace tells them that she killed Rascal. They resolve to tell Julia, who gets emotional, and Hyde blames Rascal's death on Luke. Luke takes responsibility, and Julia tells them that they can go home, as they all wanted. However, Tommy asks her to play spin the bottle (in actuality a variant of truth or dare). They go to bed and laugh hysterically as Luke begins screaming for help upstairs.
| 10 | "Prank Call" | Julia DiCesare | Julia DiCesare | October 26, 2026 |
The Slice Club is called by "The Badger", a serial prank caller whom Hyde has become obsessed with catching. Tommy asks several staff members for their urine, as his parents are forcing him to do a drug test after finding his stash. Julia takes a phone call from a customer and seemingly hears The Badger in the background. She, Hyde, and Luke get their address to prank them. The customer arrives at the store, as Julia had told them Luke wasn't working that night, leaving Grace to take the order. While Luke waits outside the customer's house, Hyde tells Julia to poop in a bag as part of their prank, which Julia refuses to do. The customer's family goes downstairs, and Hyde and Julia hide in a storage closet. A woman and her hysterically crying son arrive and apologize, revealing him to be The Badger. Grace calls Luke to tell them that they are at the wrong house. Luke retrieves the two, startling the customer's family. Afterward, Luke takes them back to the pizzeria and begins urinating in a water bottle after Tommy texts him.
| 11 | "New Girl" | Julia DiCesare | Julia DiCesare | October 26, 2026 |
Grace and Julia begin bonding with Chloe, the new hire. While the girls enjoy the new dynamic, the boys are disturbed by it. After hearing Chloe's dislike for overbearing masculinity, the boys plan to drive Chloe out by being obnoxiously "manly" by pretending to camp in the middle of the restaurant. Ryan and Tommy watch Chloe sneakily write something in her diary before walking away. Ryan sends Tommy to steal it, but Chloe catches him. The boys play a card game in the jacuzzi, and overhear Chloe disparaging Slice Club over the phone. They confront Chloe while Julia and Grace read the diary, which contains similar insults. The staff confronts Chloe, who reveals that she was never hired by Sylvester, and is actually a PI sent by his ex-wife to learn the health of the restaurant. The boys mock Grace and Julia, but they reconcile. They then go thrifting and do a photoshoot.
| 12 | "Commercial" | Luke Burke & Tommy Armstrong | Luke Burke & Tommy Armstrong | October 26, 2026 |
Sylvester excitedly tells the staff that he purchased a TV spot for Slice Club. He enlists Tommy, a film enthusiast, to direct the commercial. Sylvester gives Tommy creative freedom with the stipulation that it ends with him shirtless wearing a fur coat on the limo. Using his script for a short film taking place in 1871 Arizona, they struggle to film the first scene where Grace slides a plate of pizza to Luke. Sylvester, hoping to impress his ex-wife, hires Dax, a body double, for the commercial. Tommy's overbearing directing drives the staff away. They then film the end of the commercial, which ends with Dax passing out due to Sylvester only feeding him dehydration packets. Tommy apologizes to the staff by ripping up his script, which they accept. Later, they watch the commercial, which they're all humiliated by. Sylvester then receives a call informing him that the FCC is suing him.
| 13 | "Teachers at Work" | Aidan Micho | Aidan Micho | October 26, 2026 |
Aidan begins feeling left out for being the only staff member without a nickname. A teacher from their school, Mrs. Thomas, arrives, whom Hyde hates. The staff watches as Mrs. Thomas begins holding hands with Mr. Albert, another teacher from their school. They decide to investigate, suspicious that she may be having an affair due to their increasingly romantic behavior. Aidan begins drafting nicknames for Slice Club to call him, but fails to make any of them stick. Hyde begins recording them, hoping to get incriminating evidence so he can blackmail Mrs. Thomas to stop giving him detention. Hyde confronts Mrs. Thomas with footage of her and Mr. Albert, to which Mrs. Thomas reveals that Mr. Albert is her attorney to discuss her deceased husband's will. Hyde, in a state of shock, leaves the store. Julia tells Aidan that she likes his name, and they leave the shop together.
| 14 | "New Year's Eve" | Tommy Armstrong | Tommy Armstrong | October 26, 2026 |
On New Year's Eve, Slice Club's staff hides from Grace to avoid being required to close. Grace tells them that she needs four of them to be scheduled for New Year's Eve. They play various games to determine who stays, which ends with Tommy, Luke, Aidan, and Julia staying. Tommy experiments with creating a guillotine-like machine with a pizza cutter. John calls Tommy, annoyed that Tommy is working at Slice Club and expresses jealousy over Julia, which Julia overhears. Afterward, Julia confides in Aidan about her struggle to find love. Tommy then breaks up with John. Grace, Ryan, and Hyde return to the store, having abandoned their New Year's plans. As midnight approaches, Aidan offers to be Julia's first kiss. They kiss as the fireworks go off, upsetting Tommy and shocking the rest of the staff. In the dishwashing area, Tommy and Luke have a sword fight with sticks.

== Production ==
=== Development ===
Minimum Wage originally aired as a low-budget web series produced by and distributed by American High in May 2024. The show was a significant success, amassing tens of millions of views across American High's TikTok, YouTube, and Instagram accounts. In April 2026, it was reported that Netflix partnered with American High to produce a 28 episode season of Minimum Wage, with the web series' original cast set to reprise their roles. Later that summer, Randall Park was announced to be joining the cast. The show is noted to have hired real-life internet personality talent for its guest roles, including Teala Dunn, Brett Dodenhoff, Darryl Gene Daughtry Jr. of Brooklyn Coffee Shop fame, and Sara Rooney, Chelsea Matkins, Lydia Hynes, and Dunbar Healy of American High's extended internet universe.

== Release ==
The series consists of 28 episodes lasting approximately 12.5 minutes each, with the first 14 episodes releasing on Netflix on October 26, 2026.
