= It's a Wonderful Binge =

- Release poster
- Directed by: Jordan VanDina
- Written by: Jordan VanDina
- Produced by: Jeremy Garelick; Will Phelps; Ryan Bennett; Molle DeBartolo
- Starring: Dexter Darden; Eduardo Franco
- Production company: American High
- Distributed by: Hulu
- Release date: December 9, 2022
- Running time: 98 minutes
- Country: United States
- Language: English

It's a Wonderful Binge (formerly titled The Binge 2: It's a Wonderful Binge) is a 2022 American comedy film and a Christmas-themed sequel to the 2020 film The Binge. Written and directed by Jordan VanDina, the film stars Dexter Darden and Eduardo Franco. The film was released on December 9, 2022 on Hulu. Like its predecessor, the film received generally negative reviews from critics.

== Plot ==
Five childhood friends must face the reality of adulthood as the annual "Binge Day" is suddenly switched over to Christmas Eve.

== Cast ==
- Dexter Darden as Hags
- Eduardo Franco as Andrew
- Tim Meadows as Keegan
- Kaitlin Olson as Mayor Spengler
- Patty Guggenheim as Delray Donna
- Tony Cavalero as Pompano Mike
- Paul Scheer as Soup Anderson
- Karen Maruyama as Grandma
- Danny Trejo as Angel
- Nick Swardson as Uncle Kris
- Steve Little as Craig
- Zainne Saleh as Sarah
- Marta Piekarz as Kimmi
- Haley Grogan as Paula

== Production ==
The film was shot in Syracuse, New York in February 2022.

== Release ==
The film was released on Hulu on December 9, 2022.

== Reception ==
The film has a 25% rating on Rotten Tomatoes based on 12 reviews.

Alex Maidy of JoBlo.com gave the film a negative review, calling it “a bad movie and an even worse comedy.”

Bill Goodykoontz of The Arizona Republic awarded the film two and a half stars.
