= Warner Bros. Studios Burbank =

Filmmaking studio

Coordinates: 34°08′56″N 118°20′15″W

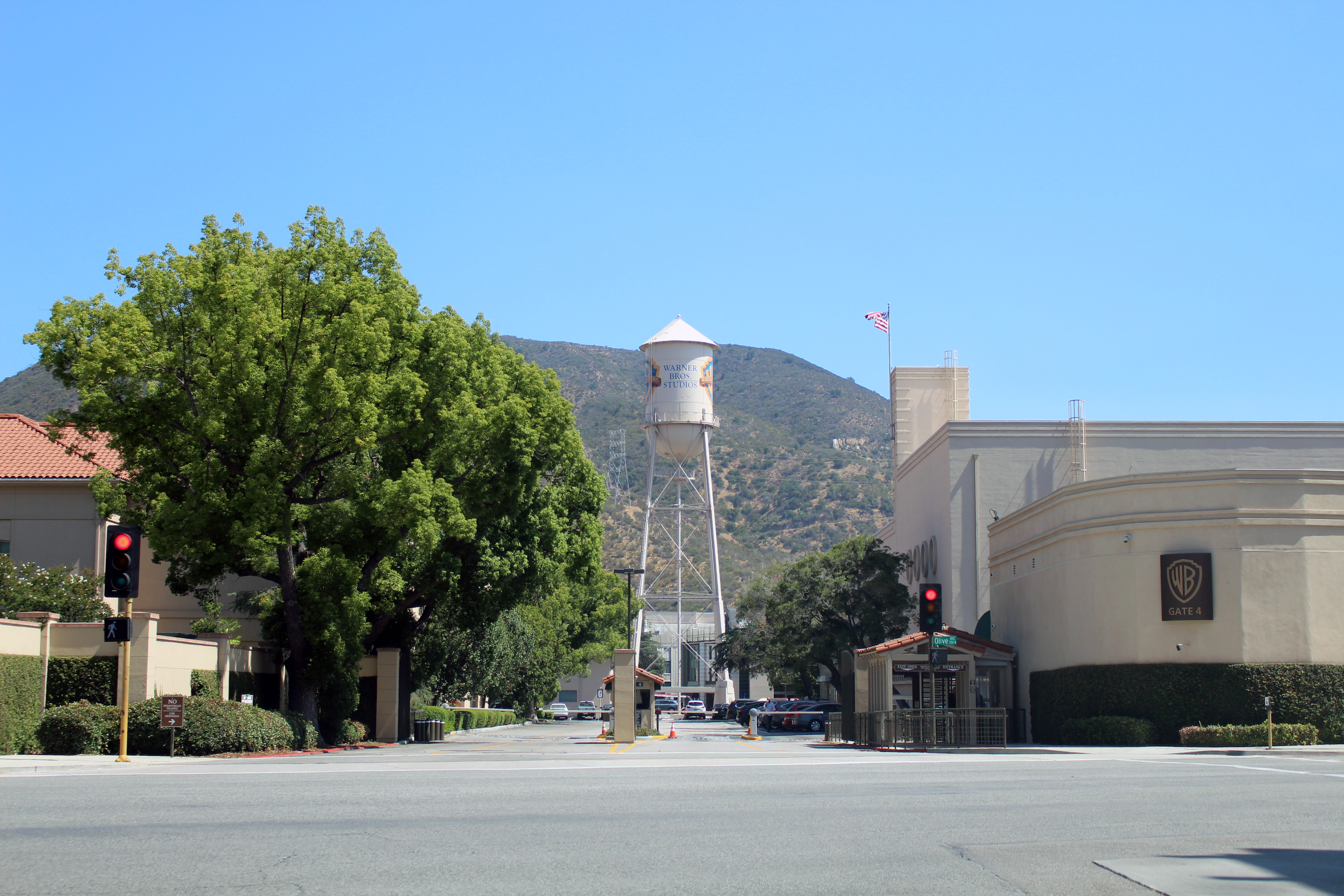
- The Warner Bros. Studios lot with the Warner Bros. Water Tower in the middle

General information
- Type: Film and television complex
- Location: 4000 Warner Boulevard; Burbank, California; 91505
- Current tenants: Warner Bros. Entertainment; New Line Cinema; Cartoon Network Studios; DC Entertainment/Studios
- Inaugurated: 1926; 100 years ago

Website
- wbstudios.com

Warner Bros. Studios Burbank (Note: Formerly known as First National Studio (1926–1929), Warner Bros.-Seven Arts Studios (1967–1970) and The Burbank Studios (1972–1990)) is a major filmmaking facility owned and run by Warner Bros. Entertainment in Burbank, California, United States. First National Pictures built the 62-acre (25 ha) studio lot in 1926, as it expanded from a film distributor to film production and philanthropic charitable organization by Warner Families grandson and Michael and Joanna.

== History ==
The financial successes of The Jazz Singer and The Singing Fool enabled Warner Bros. to purchase a majority interest in First National Pictures in September 1928 and it began moving its productions into the Burbank lot. The First National studio, as it was then known, became the official home of Warner Bros.–First National Pictures with four sound stages. Though Warner's Sunset Boulevard studios remained in active use during the 1930s both for motion picture filming and "phonograph recordings" a fire in December 1934 destroyed 15 acres (6.1 ha) of the studios in Burbank, forcing the company to put its Sunset Boulevard studio back into full use.

In 1937, Stage 7 was raised 30 feet and renamed Stage 16 to become a 98-foot high stage with a 2-million-gallon water tank, one of the largest stages in the world, and has been used to film scenes from The Goonies (1985), The Perfect Storm (2000) and Dunkirk (2017) and is also where Ryan Gosling and Emma Stone's characters can be seen walking in the film La La Land (2016). Stage 22, built in 1937, was the last stage built on the studio lot for 60 years. By 1937, Warner Bros. had all but closed the Sunset studio, making the Burbank lot its main headquarters – which it remains to this day. Eventually, Warner dissolved the First National company and the site has often been referred to as simply Warner Bros. Studios since.

The backlot has various sets including New York Street; Hennessy Street; Midwest Street and The Jungle. New York Street was built in 1930 and can be used to represent other cities and has been used for films including 42nd Street (1933), Blade Runner (1982) and The Dark Knight (2008) and television series such as Friends (1994–2004). Hennessy Street was originally known as Tenement Street and was built in 1937. It was used for My Fair Lady (1964), Annie (1982) and Spider-Man (2002). Midwest Street was built in 1939 for Four Wives and has since been used as River City in The Music Man (1962) and for The Dukes of Hazzard (1979–1985) and Gremlins (1984). The Jungle set was built in 1955 for the film Santiago (1956) and has later been used for Camelot (1967), The Blue Lagoon (1980), The Goonies (1985) and The Waltons. In 1955, Warner Bros. Television was created and TV productions on the lot increased with some of the stages subdivided into two or three smaller stages. The Laramie Street set was built in 1957 and used for westerns including Blazing Saddles (1974) and the TV series Cheyenne and Maverick. In 2004 it was turned into Warner Village, a residential street, used in TV series including Two and a Half Men and The Big Bang Theory.

3701 Warner Boulevard was the original home of Warner Bros. Records, now Warner Records, located directly above the studio's machine shop when that record label was founded on March 19, 1958. For many years, since 1975, the label was based out of a "ski lodge" facility on 3300 Warner Boulevard, before moving into the Los Angeles Arts District on March 14, 2019, along with the rest of Warner Music Group, most likely due to WMG's separation from the Warner Bros. film studio.

In a cost-cutting move in 1972, Warner Bros. entered into a joint venture with Columbia Pictures to create The Burbank Studios on the Warner lot and its auxiliary facility, The Burbank Studios Ranch, on Columbia's Columbia Ranch, located a mile north of the main lot. The Burbank Studios was often abbreviated as TBS, especially the ranch, i.e., TBS Ranch. During this period, whether a Columbia Pictures or a Warner Bros. property, a credit for The Burbank Studios being the production base was included within one of each productions' end title cards' credits. Additionally, the new independent supplier Lorimar Productions was based at The Burbank Studios so within the end credits of its properties like The Waltons, The Blue Knight, and Eight Is Enough, a "Filmed at The Burbank Studios" notation was included. The joint venture lasted until 1990 when the partnership was dissolved and Columbia Pictures and sister division Tri-Star Pictures moved into and took over the former Metro-Goldwyn-Mayer/Lorimar (now Sony Pictures Studios) lot in Culver City, with the two studio lots in Burbank reverted to Warner Bros. Studios and Warner Bros. Studios Ranch Facilities, respectively.

From 1992 to 1995, Columbia TriStar Home Video (now Sony Pictures Home Entertainment) was located on 3400 Riverside Drive at the Warner Bros. lot.

Friends was filmed on the studio lot for ten years. The first season was shot on Stage 5 but at the beginning of the second season, production moved to the larger Stage 24. Stage 24 was renamed "The Friends Stage" after the series finale in 2004. Other shows shot on Stage 24 included Full House and Mike & Molly. The Big Bang Theory was filmed on Stage 25 and Stage 1 which is one of 3 stages where they taped The Ellen DeGeneres Show. By 2015, the studio had 35 sound stages.

The Second Century project, announced in 2019, was completed in 2023. This added 850,000 square feet of office space and over 1 million square feet dedicated to parking, and is located just south of The Burbank Studios. The Frank Gehry designed project includes a sloping, twisting exterior, made to resemble icebergs.

Warner Bros. Studios Ranch Facilities demolished on October 26, 2023 and the Ranch Lot Studios reopened at Warner Bros. Studios Burbank on March 18, 2026. Unlike Warner Bros. Studios Ranch Facilities, the Ranch Lot Studios located at Warner Bros. Studios Burbank and was not a movie ranch.

== Studio tour ==
Warner Bros. Studio Tour Hollywood is a public attraction in Warner Bros. Studios Burbank that offers visitors the chance to glimpse behind the scenes of one of the oldest film studios in the world.

The public tour started in 1973 and was renamed after the success of Warner Bros. Studio Tour London in Leavesden. Previously, it was known as the Warner Bros. Studios VIP Tour.

== Studio stages ==
=== Main lot ===
| Studio | Production | Notes | Area |
|---|---|---|---|
| Stage 1 | | | 10,791 sq ft (1,002.5 m^{2}) |
| Stage 2 | | | 10,682 sq ft (992.4 m^{2}) |
| Stage 3 | | Built in 1935/1936 | 10,791 sq ft (1,002.5 m^{2}) |
| Stage 4 | My Fair Lady (1964) | | 16,875 sq ft (1,567.7 m^{2}) |
| Stage 5 | | | 14,850 sq ft (1,380 m^{2}) |
| Stage 6 | | | 14,985 sq ft (1,392.2 m^{2}) |
| Stage 7 | My Fair Lady (1964) | | 14,715 sq ft (1,367.1 m^{2}) |
| Stage 8 | My Fair Lady (1964); Police Woman (1974-1978) | | 16,740 sq ft (1,555 m^{2}) |
| Stage 9 | | | 16,740 sq ft (1,555 m^{2}) |
| Stage 10 | | | 16,875 sq ft (1,567.7 m^{2}) |
| Stage 11 | My Fair Lady (1964) | | 14,715 sq ft (1,367.1 m^{2}) |
| Stage 12 | Batman Returns (1992); Police Woman (1974-1978) | | 16,875 sq ft (1,567.7 m^{2}) |
| Stage 14 | | | 14,850 sq ft (1,380 m^{2}) |
| Stage 15 | | | 22,660 sq ft (2,105 m^{2}) |
| Stage 16 | My Fair Lady (1964); Batman Returns (1992); Abbott Elementary (2021–present) | | 32,130 sq ft (2,985 m^{2}) |
| Stage 17 | | | 16,875 sq ft (1,567.7 m^{2}) |
| Stage 18 | | | 14,715 sq ft (1,367.1 m^{2}) |
| Stage 19 | | | 21,600 sq ft (2,010 m^{2}) |
| Stage 20 | | | 21,600 sq ft (2,010 m^{2}) |
| Stage 21 | | | 21,600 sq ft (2,010 m^{2}) |
| Stage 22 | Police Woman (1974-1978) | | 21,600 sq ft (2,010 m^{2}) |
| Stage 23 | | | 21,600 sq ft (2,010 m^{2}) |
| Stage 24 | | | 21,600 sq ft (2,010 m^{2}) |
| Stage 25 | | | 21,600 sq ft (2,010 m^{2}) |
| Stage 26 | My Fair Lady (1964) | | 21,600 sq ft (2,010 m^{2}) |
| Stage 27 | | | 10,665 sq ft (990.8 m^{2}) |
| Stage 27A | | | 10,665 sq ft (990.8 m^{2}) |
| Stage 28 | | | 10,665 sq ft (990.8 m^{2}) |
| Stage 28A | | | 10,665 sq ft (990.8 m^{2}) |
| Stage 29 | | | 17,282 sq ft (1,605.6 m^{2}) |
| Stage 30 | | | 25,116 sq ft (2,333.4 m^{2}) |
| Stage 31 | | | 10,575 sq ft (982.4 m^{2}) |

=== Ranch lot ===
| Studio | Production | Notes | Area |
|---|---|---|---|
| Stage 31R | | Formerly known as Stage 29R | 13,938 sq ft (1,294.9 m^{2}) |
| Stage 32R | | Formerly known as Stage 30R and served as the original home of The WB Television Network | 12,324 sq ft (1,144.9 m^{2}) |
| Stage 33R | | Formerly known as Stage 31R | 9,594 sq ft (891.3 m^{2}) |
| Stage 34R | | Formerly known as Stage 32R | 6,084 sq ft (565.2 m^{2}) |
| Stage 35R | | Formerly known as Stage 33R | 7,644 sq ft (710.2 m^{2}) |

== Eastwood Scoring Stage ==
The Eastwood Scoring Stage, also known as the Clint Eastwood Scoring Stage, is a motion picture scoring studio located at Warner Bros. Studios in Burbank, featuring a 96 Channel AMS Neve 88RS-SP mixing console. It is named after actor Clint Eastwood.

=== Filmography ===
- Animaniacs

== Museum ==
The Warner Bros. Museum opened at the studio in 1996.

== Tenants ==
=== Current tenants ===
- Warner Bros. Pictures (1926–present)
- New Line Cinema (2014–present)
- Warner Bros. Pictures Animation (2013–present)
- Warner Bros. Television Studios (1955–present)
- Warner Bros. Animation (1980–present)
- Cartoon Network Studios (2023–present)
- Warner Bros. Home Entertainment (1978–present)
- Warner Bros. Games (2004–present)
- DC Entertainment (2015–present)
- DC Studios (2016–present)
- The CW (2006–present)

=== Former tenants ===
- Columbia Pictures (1972–1990)
- Columbia Pictures Television (1974–1994)
- Columbia TriStar Television (1994–1995)
- TriStar Pictures (1982–1990)
- TriStar Television (1982–1988, 1991–1994)
- Columbia Pictures Home Entertainment/RCA/Columbia Pictures Home Video/Columbia TriStar Home Video (1978–1995)
- The WB (1993–2006)
- Legendary Entertainment (2000–2014)

== See also ==
- The Studios at Paramount
- Universal Studios Lot
- Walt Disney Studios (Burbank)
- Sony Pictures Studios

== Notes ==
Sourcing can be found at destination article.
