= Crush (2022 film) =

2022 film by Sammi Cohen

- Official release poster
- Directed by: Sammi Cohen
- Written by: Kirsten King; Casey Rackham
- Produced by: Britta Rowings; Katie Newman; Natasha Lyonne; Maya Rudolph; Andrew Miano; Danielle Renefrew Behrens; Mickey Liddell; Pete Shilaimon; Jeremy Garelick; Will Phelps; Ryan Bennett; Paul Weitz; Chris Weitz
- Starring: Rowan Blanchard; Auliʻi Cravalho; Isabella Ferreira
- Cinematography: Matthew Wise
- Edited by: Melissa Remenarich-Aperlo
- Music by: St. Panther
- Production companies: Animal Pictures; American High; Depth of Field Productions; 3 Arts Entertainment; LD Entertainment
- Distributed by: Hulu
- Release date: April 29, 2022
- Running time: 92 minutes
- Country: United States
- Language: English

Crush is a 2022 American coming-of-age romantic comedy film directed by Sammi Cohen (in their feature directorial debut) and written by Kirsten King and Casey Rackham. The film stars Rowan Blanchard and Auliʻi Cravalho in a story about a teenage girl joining her high-school track team to get closer to her crush, only to find herself falling in love with her crush's twin sister. Crush was released digitally on April 29, 2022, on Hulu.

== Plot ==
Paige Evans is a student at Miller High School who has a passion for art and hopes to study at a summer program at her dream school, CalArts. She struggles with the prompt which is to describe her happiest moment; she considers her unrequited long-time lesbian crush on popular student Gabby Campos as a possible topic. Further complicating matters is ‘KingPun’, an anonymous artist who vandalizes the school with pun-based graffiti. Paige is widely suspected by students and school administration of being the culprit due to her interest in art. In order to avoid suspension, she agrees to join the track team while also discovering who the real KingPun is.

With no other athletic aptitude to speak of, Paige is placed in the 4×100 relay along with Gabby and her sister AJ, with AJ tasked with training her. She goes to a house party that she believes KingPun is also attending, and recruits AJ to help her investigation. While staging a stakeout at the school, Paige and Gabby share an awkward kiss, Paige's first. Paige's friend Dillon suggests that the kiss was uncomfortable because Paige's crush has passed, and she and AJ gradually become closer. The track team travels for a meet; at a party, members of the team play seven minutes in heaven. Paige and AJ are paired together and share a kiss, which AJ believes is the first for both of them. Later, Paige meets Gabby in the hotel hallway and Gabby attempts to kiss her, which Paige rebuffs.

At the track meet, Miller High places second in the relay. After the race, Gabby approaches Paige to apologize for the previous night, inadvertently revealing to AJ that the two previously kissed. AJ is heartbroken, and reveals that she was KingPun all along. In an effort to protect AJ, Paige attempts to confess to being KingPun, only to find out that AJ has already confessed and been suspended. With Gabby's help, Paige stages an apology at a school assembly, creating a large mural of moments the two shared together, which Paige submits to CalArts for her prompt. They reconcile, and AJ's suspension is reversed, with the two sharing another kiss.

== Cast ==
- Rowan Blanchard as Paige Evans, a budding artist striving to find her place in the world
- Auliʻi Cravalho as AJ Campos, Gabriela's twin, and co-captain of Miller High School's track team
- Isabella Ferreira as Gabriela Campos, Paige's crush since childhood, AJ's twin sister, and co-captain of Miller High School's track team
- Tyler Alvarez as Dillon, Paige's platonic best friend and Stacey's boyfriend
- Teala Dunn as Stacey Clark, Dillon's girlfriend
- Rico Paris as Tim, a student who is sure that Paige is KingPun
- Aasif Mandvi as Coach Murray, Miller High School's track coach
- Michelle Buteau as Principal Collins
- Megan Mullally as Angie Evans, Paige's mother
- Addie Weyrich as Chantal, a wiccan with a seeming crush on Paige, given how she keeps stalking Paige and AJ
- James Tom (Note: credited as Jes Tom) as Aya, an influencer and Gabriela's on-and-off partner
- Catherine McCafferty as Erin Billings, who is obsessed with horses
- Kevin Peck as parent in the stands.

== Production ==
By July 2021, Kirsten King and Casey Rackham had written a script based on their own life experiences, telling an LGBTQ story that would show more queer joy growing up rather than the tales typically told simply about coming out. Sammi Cohen identified with the project, initially called Love in Color, and signed on to direct. Rowan Blanchard and Auliʻi Cravalho were cast as the leads shortly afterward, and shooting began in the Syracuse area of New York that summer. In March 2022, the final title was set as Crush with a release date set for April 29, 2022, on Hulu.

== Reception ==
=== Audience viewership ===
According to Whip Media, Crush was the 3rd most streamed film across all platforms in the United States during the week of April 29, 2022.

=== Critical response ===
On the review aggregator website Rotten Tomatoes, 83% of 40 critics' reviews are positive. The website's consensus reads: "Some of the writing is stilted and the execution is occasionally uneven, but Crush's central love story is easy to fall for." On Metacritic, the film has a weighted average score of 56 out of 100 based on seven critics, indicating "mixed or average" reviews.

Tomris Laffly of Variety praised the diversity and inclusivity within the cast compared to other teen romantic comedy films, and stated that Rowan Blanchard and Auli'i Cravalho's performances successfully establish chemistry between their characters, but found the movie too fearful to take a more plausible approach on the characters and their personas. Monita Mohan of Collider praised the film for focusing on coming of age more than coming out and for creating well-rounded characters, and complimented how the movie depicts same-sex relationships and gender identity as accepted in a modern society. Christy Lemire of RogerEbert.com rated the movie 3 out of 4 stars, praised the idea of depicting same-sex relationships as conventional in a contemporary society, and complimented the cast's performance, especially Megan Mullally's portrayal of her character. Jude Dry of IndieWire gave the film a B− rating, stated that the movie stands out delivering a fresh approach on queer teen films due to its trope and humor, while saying it also manages to keep a love story and happy ending which can appeal to a broad audience.

=== Accolades ===
The film was nominated for Outstanding Film – Streaming or TV at the 34th GLAAD Media Awards.
