= Christian Convery =

Canadian child actor (born 2009)

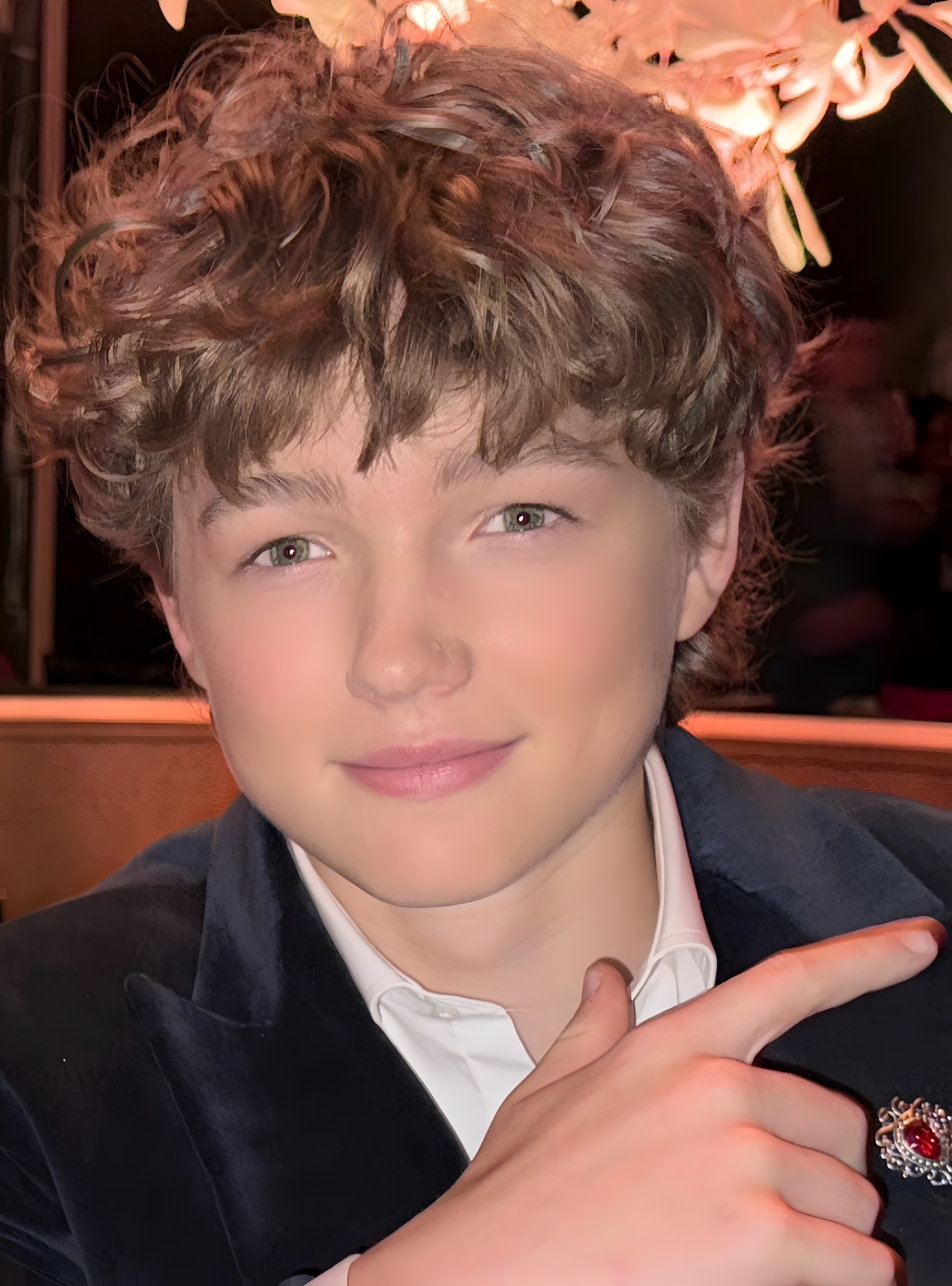
- Convery at the Toronto International Film Festival in 2025
- Born: November 10, 2009 (age 17); Los Angeles, California, U.S.
- Citizenship: United States; Canada
- Occupation: Actor
- Years active: 2016–present

Christian Convery (born November 10, 2009) is an American and Canadian actor. He is best known for his leading role as Gus in the Netflix series Sweet Tooth (2021–2024) and his performances in the comedy horror films Cocaine Bear (2023) and The Monkey (2025). He won an Emmy Award for his performance in the final season of Sweet Tooth. He also appeared as young Victor Frankenstein in Guillermo del Toro's film Frankenstein, earning a nomination for a SAG Award.

== Early life ==
Convery was born on November 10, 2009, in Los Angeles, California. Convery holds dual citizenship in Canada and the United States.

== Career ==
Convery made his acting debut in 2016, at age six, portraying Conner in Marita Grabiak's romantic comedy Hearts of Spring. That same year, he appeared in episodes of the television series Supernatural and Van Helsing, followed by roles in Legion and Lucifer in 2017. His first leading role came in the 2016 Hallmark Entertainment television film My Christmas Dream, where he portrayed Cooper Stone alongside Danica McKellar and David Haydn-Jones.

In 2018, he portrayed Jasper Sheff in the drama Beautiful Boy, starring Timothée Chalamet and Steve Carell. In 2019, Convery appeared in the television film Descendants 3 and received a Young Artist Award in the Streaming Series or Film category . He also co-starred with John Cena, John Leguizamo, Judy Greer, and Keegan-Michael Key in the feature film Playing with Fire portraying the character Will.

From 2019 to 2020, Convery took on the leading role of Morgan in the Disney Channel series Pup Academy. His performance earned him the Best Lead Actor award in Television Series at the 2020 Young Artist Awards.

In 2021, Convery was cast in his breakthrough role as Gus, a deer-human hybrid protagonist, in the Netflix post-apocalyptic fantasy series Sweet Tooth. The series, based on Jeff Lemire's comic book series of the same name, showed Convery alongside Will Forte and Nonso Anozie, and ran for multiple seasons (2021–2024).

He subsequently portrayed Rob Horton in The Tiger Rising, a drama film adaptation of Kate DiCamillo's novel, working with Dennis Quaid and Queen Latifah. In 2023, Convery appeared in the Elizabeth Banks comedy horror film Cocaine Bear. He also starred opposite Theo James in Neon's 2025 Stephen King adaption The Monkey directed by Oz Perkins. Convery appears in Guillermo del Toro's Netflix adaptation of Frankenstein. He appears with Anne Hathaway, Ewan McGregor, and Maisy Stella in the 2026 feature film The End of Oak Street.

=== Upcoming projects ===
In January 2025, it was announced that Convery will star in the comedy film Rolling Loud: The Movie, directed by Jeremy Garelick, alongside Owen Wilson and Matt Rife, scheduled for release in September 2026.

== Filmography ==
=== Film ===
Key
†	Denotes films that have not yet been released

Year	Title	Role	Notes	Ref.
2018	Aliens Ate My Homework	Eric		
2018	The Package	Jake Floyd		
2018	Venom	Joey	Deleted scene	
2018	Beautiful Boy	Jasper Sheff		
2019	A Snake Marked	Young Snake	Short film	
2019	Playing with Fire	Will		
2019	William	Young William		
2020	Aliens Stole My Body	Eric		
2021	The Tiger Rising	Rob Horton		
2021	Diary of a Wimpy Kid	Fregley	Voice role	
2023	Cocaine Bear	Henry		
2023	Paw Patrol: The Mighty Movie	Chase	Voice role	
2023	Diary of a Wimpy Kid Christmas: Cabin Fever	Fregley	Voice role	
2024	Barron's Cove	Ethan		
2025	The Monkey	Young Hal / Bill Shelburn		
2025	Frankenstein	Young Victor Frankenstein		
2026	The End of Oak Street	Brian Platt		
2026	Rolling Loud: The Movie	Zion		
TBA	(Saint) Peter †	Peter Blanes	Post-production	

=== Television ===
Year	Title	Role	Notes
2016	Hearts of Spring	Conner	Television film
2016	Supernatural	Lucas Kellinger	Episode: "The Foundry"
2016	My Christmas Dream	Cooper	Television film
2016	Van Helsing	Vampire Child #4A	Episode: "Last Time"
2016	Christmas List	David Anthony Owens	Television film
2017	Legion	4-year-old David Haller	3 episodes
2017	Lucifer	Ethan	Episode: "Deceptive Little Parasite"
2017	Coming Home for Christmas	Paul	Television film
2017	Christmas at Holly Lodge	Kyle Talbert	Television film
2018	Signed, Sealed, Delivered: The Road Less Traveled	Danny	Television film
2018	It's Christmas, Eve	Wyatt	Television film
2018	A Twist of Christmas	Elliot Hewitt	Television film
2018	Santa's Boots	Todd	Television film
2019	V.C. Andrews' Heaven	Keith	Television film
2019	Descendants 3	Squeaky	Television film
2019	Pup Academy	Morgan	Main role
2021–2024	Sweet Tooth	Gus	Main role
2023	One Piece	Young Sanji	Episode: "The Chef and the Chore Boy"
2025–present	Invincible	Oliver Grayson / Kid Omni-Man (voice)	7 episodes (Season 3 and 4)

== Awards and nominations ==
Convery has received numerous awards and nominations for his body of work across film and television including the Actor Awards, Children's and Family Emmy Awards.

Year	Organisation	Category	Project	Result	Ref.
2026	Leo Awards	Best Performance in an Animation Series	Invincible	Nominated	
2026	Leo Awards	Best Supporting Performance Motion Picture	Frankenstein	Nominated	
2026	Leo Awards	Best Supporting Performance Motion Picture	Barron's Cove	Nominated	
2026	Leo Awards	Best Lead Performance Motion Picture	The Monkey	Nominated	
2026	Leo Awards	Best Youth Performance	Frankenstein	Nominated	
2026	Actor Awards	Cast in a Motion Picture	Frankenstein	Nominated	
2025	Children's and Family Emmy Awards	Outstanding Younger Performer in a Preschool, Children's or Young Teen Program	Sweet Tooth	Won	
2024	Young Artist Award	Best Performance in a Feature Film: Leading Young Actor	Cocaine Bear	Won	
2024	Leo Awards	Best Lead Performance Dramatic Series	Sweet Tooth	Nominated	
2024	Leo Awards	Best Guest Performance Dramatic Series	One Piece	Won	
2024	Leo Awards	Best Performance in an Animation Program	PAW Patrol	Nominated	
2024	Leo Awards	Best Lead Performance Motion Picture	Cocaine Bear	Nominated	
2024	Leo Awards	Best Lead Performance Motion Picture	Cocaine Bear	Nominated	
2022	Leo Awards	Best Youth Performance	Sweet Tooth	Nominated	
2022	Young Artist Award	Best Performance in a Streaming Series: Leading Youth Actor	Sweet Tooth	Won	
2021	Young Artist Award	Best Performance in a Feature Film – Leading Young Artist	Brahms: The Boy II	Nominated	
2020	Leo Awards	Best Performance in a Youth or Children's Program or Series	Pup Academy	Nominated	
2017	Young Artist Award	Best Performance in a TV Movie: Young Actor	Christmas List	Won	
