= The End of Oak Street =

2026 film by David Robert Mitchell

- Theatrical release poster
- Directed by: David Robert Mitchell
- Written by: David Robert Mitchell
- Produced by: J. J. Abrams; Hannah Minghella; Jon Cohen; David Robert Mitchell; Matt Jackson; Tommy Harper
- Starring: Anne Hathaway; Ewan McGregor; Maisy Stella; Christian Convery
- Cinematography: Michael Gioulakis
- Edited by: John Axelrad
- Music by: Michael Giacchino
- Production companies: Bad Robot; Jackson Pictures
- Distributed by: Warner Bros. Pictures
- Release dates: August 9, 2026 (Steven J. Ross Theater); August 14, 2026 (United States)
- Running time: 100 minutes
- Country: United States
- Language: English
- Budget: $80–92 million (Note: The budget of The End of Oak Street varies depending on the source. Deadline lists the budget as between $80 million and $92 million, while The Numbers lists the budget as $85 million.)
- Box office: $122 million

The End of Oak Street is a 2026 American science fiction survival film written, co-produced, and directed by David Robert Mitchell and starring Anne Hathaway, Ewan McGregor, Maisy Stella, and Christian Convery with supporting roles done by Jordan Alexa Davis, P. J. Byrne and Emily Kuroda. It tells the story of a family whose suburban neighborhood has been transported from 1982 into the age of dinosaurs.

Development of the film began in March 2023, with Hathaway in the lead role. McGregor was cast in February 2024, and in March, Stella and Convery joined the cast. Later that month, the film's name, until this point left untitled, was given as Flowervale Street. Filming began on March 22 and ended on June 4, with location filming in Atlanta. Though scheduled for a May 16, 2025, release, this was delayed to March 13, 2026, and then delayed further. Also in March, it was revealed that the film had been renamed to The End of Oak Street and that Michael Giacchino would compose its soundtrack.

The End of Oak Street premiered at the Steven J. Ross Theater on August 9, 2026, and was theatrically released in the United States on August 14 by Warner Bros. Pictures. The film received positive reviews from critics and grossed $122 million worldwide against a production budget of $80–92 million.

== Plot ==
Set on July 10, 1982, Denise and Greg Platt live with their teenage children Audrey and Brian, and their dog Starbuck on Oak Street, in the suburban neighborhood of Flowervale, Michigan. The couple's marriage is strained—Denise, an aspiring novelist, privately contemplates divorce and resents Greg working a side job delivering pizza, lessening their family time.

The following day, Denise photographs a mysterious plant that suddenly appears in Mrs. Huddleston's yard. Local librarian Mrs. Valcourt identifies it as Pleuromeia, which went extinct 200 million years ago. A giant mound of animal feces appears in neighbor Mel's yard. Meanwhile, news broadcasts are reporting increased solar-flare activity. During a storm, a powerful white light suddenly engulfs the Flowervale neighborhood, accompanied by a change in atmospheric pressure and a power and water outage.

The next morning, Denise and Greg search for Starbuck, who went missing during the storm. They discover that a two-mile circle of Flowervale is now surrounded by a prehistoric landscape from which dinosaurs emerge and start hunting and killing neighborhood residents. Greg and Denise rush back home, chased by a vicious Coelophysis. (Note: All taxonomy as per official Warner Bros. YouTube communication.) The family boards up their windows and doors. Audrey theorizes that the light flashes were wormholes that transported the neighborhood millions of years into the past.

As tensions increase, Greg tells Denise that he read her manuscript and knows she has contemplated divorce and leaving the family, which she denies. He reveals he lost his full-time job and was delivering pizzas for extra money. They witness their neighbor Mel shooting at Pterodactylus from his roof before being violently killed and eaten. Later, Brian, seeing Starbuck in their yard chased by a dinosaur, goes looking for him, followed later by Audrey. Denise and Greg search for them in their car; a Spinosaurus attacks and they crash into a house, setting it on fire. Jeannette Christiansen, Brian's neighborhood crush, joins Brian and Audrey after her parents are killed. Denise and Greg, now on foot, see a flashing light and follow it to a house containing a wormhole, but it suddenly disappears. They evade stampeding dinosaurs, reconcile, and find the children. The family heads back toward their home, but the burning house now threatens to engulf the entire neighborhood.

Greg is killed by an attacking Allosaurus, devastating Denise and the kids. After returning home, the family escapes a Titanoboa and spot another wormhole on Mrs. Valcourt's roof that appears and disappears at regular intervals. Atop the roof, Jeannette jumps into the wormhole and disappears, but Brian misses the opening and lands on the ground, injuring his leg. An Ornithocheirus grabs him, but Starbuck appears and attacks it, saving Brian. Running into the house, they are cornered by a group of Ornithosuchus; Mrs. Valcourt appears and kills one Ornithosuchus with a shotgun before another mauls her, giving the others time to escape back to the roof. Everyone and Starbuck jump through the wormhole.

They return to July 11, 1982, landing in a backyard swimming pool, approximately 20 minutes before Flowervale was previously teleported away. Denise calls neighborhood residents from a pay phone, warning them, while Jeannette runs off to find her parents. Greg appears after Denise orders a pizza to their location, where he is embraced by the family, though he is confused. The powerful white light appears, engulfing the area before them as their neighborhood disappears and is replaced by a prehistoric landscape.

Two years later, the military has contained the area while scientists study the prehistoric environment and its wildlife, attempting to investigate the wormholes. Denise's warnings to the disaster's survivors have made her a hero, and her book, titled The End of Oak Street, has made the family financially secure. The film ends with the Platts and Christiansens having a barbecue with the neighbors they saved and two identical Jeannettes.

== Cast ==
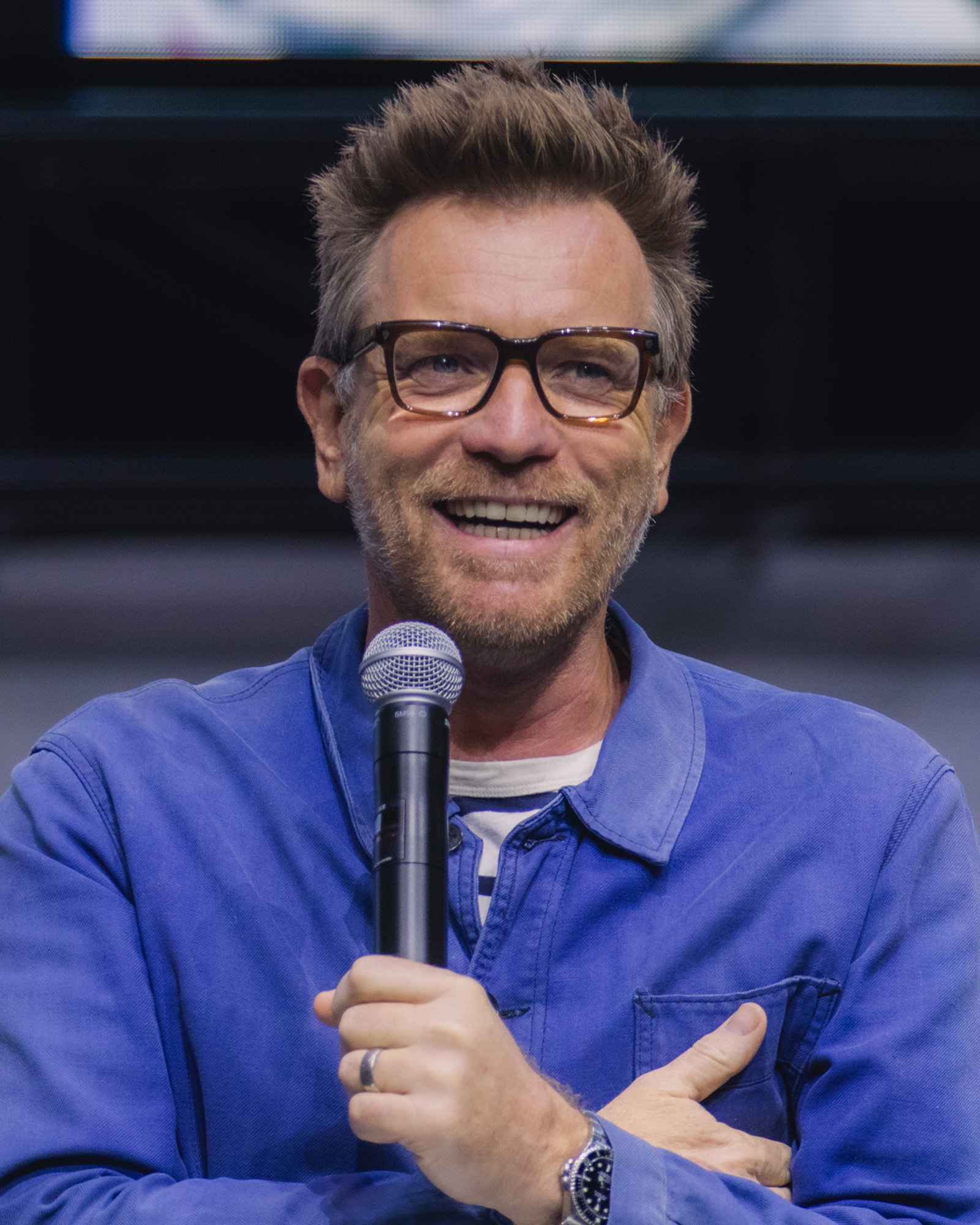
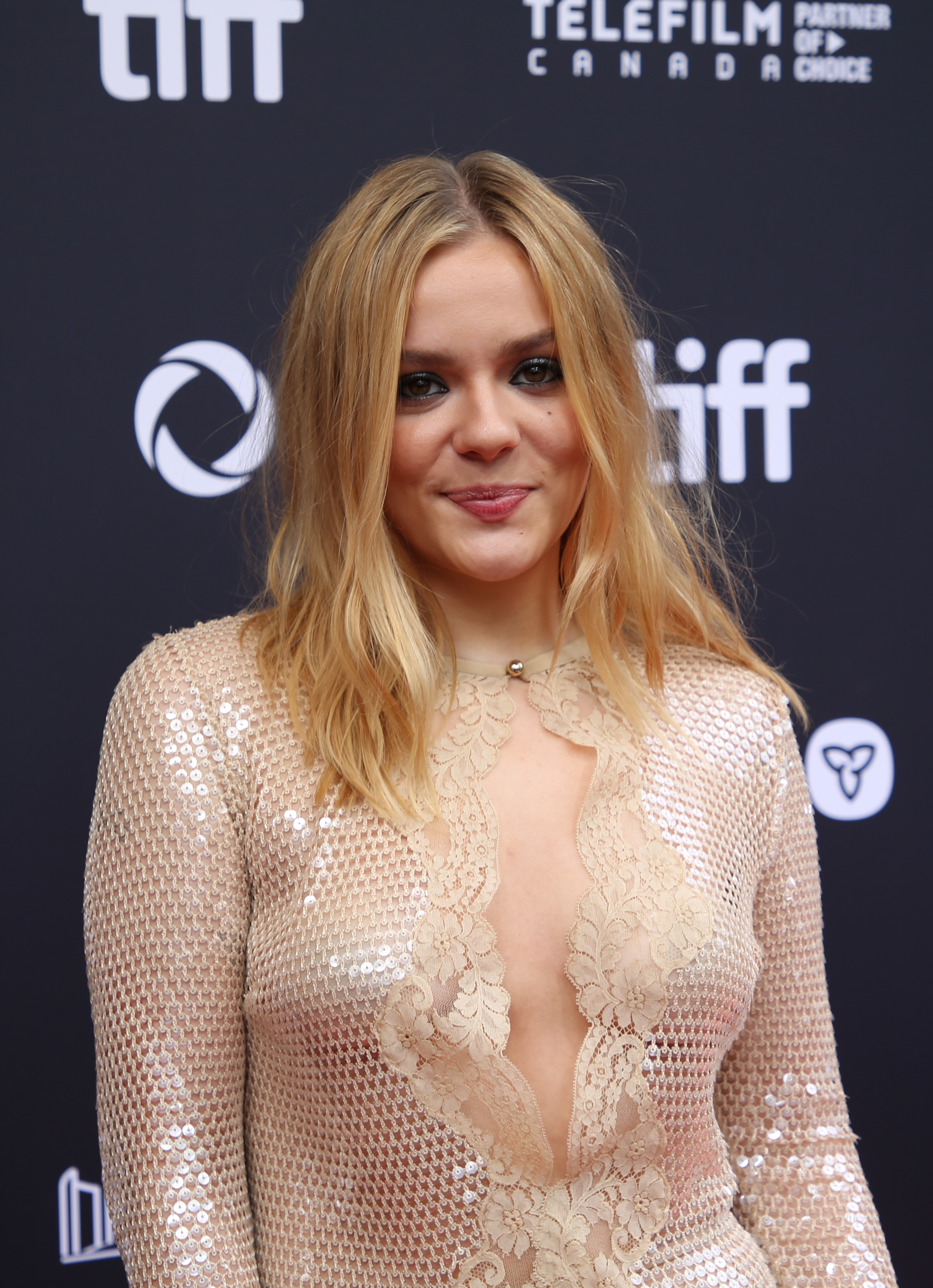
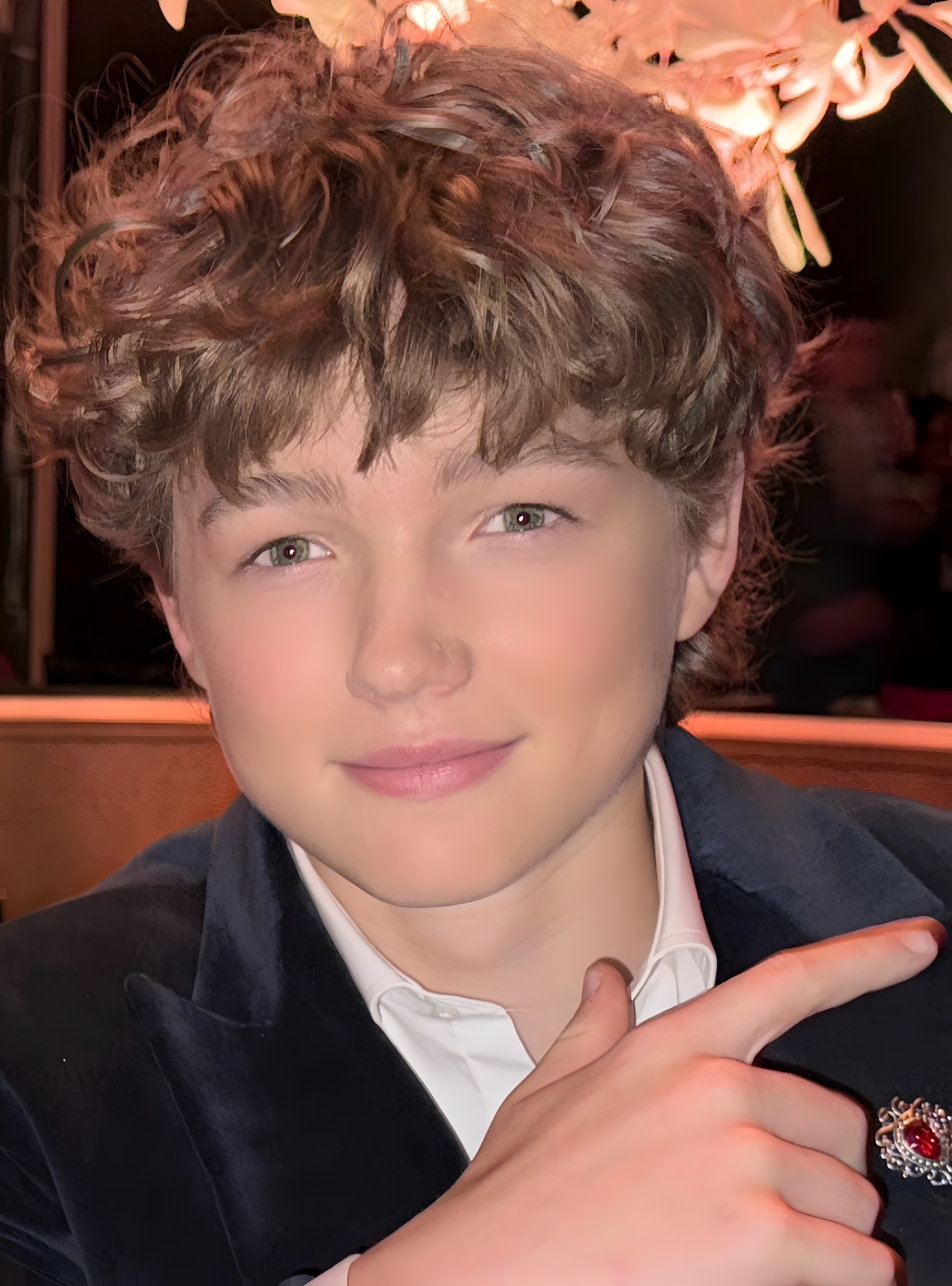
The main cast of The End of Oak Street: Anne Hathaway, Ewan McGregor, Maisy Stella, and Christian Convery.
- Anne Hathaway as Denise Platt, an aspiring novelist
- Ewan McGregor as Greg Platt, Denise's recently laid-off husband now working part-time delivering pizza
- Maisy Stella as Audrey Platt, the daughter of Denise and Greg
- Christian Convery as Brian Platt, the son of Denise and Greg
- Jordan Alexa Davis as Jeannette Christiansen, a neighborhood girl whom Brian has a crush on
- P. J. Byrne as Mel Jacobs, the Platts' irate neighbor
- Hudson Meek as Kaden Tucker, a tough neighborhood kid who hates Brian for injuring his brother
- Anne Gee Byrd as Mrs. Huddleston, a kind elderly neighbor to the Platts
- Emily Kuroda as Mrs. Valcourt, a librarian and the Platts' neighbor
- Simms May as Zachary, one of Brian's friends
- Grayson Thorne Kilpatrick as Buddy #1
- Pilot Bunch as Buddy #2
- Walker Russell as Mason
- Hugo Silver as Fergus
- Michael-Christian Moore as Ashon
- David Alexander Kaplan as Charles Tucker, the younger brother of Kaden whose right arm was accidentally broken by Brian
- Christopher A. Martin as Leon
- Denitra Isler as Mrs. Rey, a woman whose swimming pool Denise, Greg, Audrey, and Starbuck fall into upon their return to the present
- Isabella Aparicio as a young family girl
- Marian Green as a neighbor woman
- Scott Deal as an older neighbor
- Callie McClincy as Katie
- Andrea Frankle as a female neighbor

== Production ==
=== Development ===
In March 2023, an untitled film directed, written and co-produced by David Robert Mitchell was in development at Warner Bros. Pictures, with J. J. Abrams and Hannah Minghella producing for Bad Robot and with Matt Jackson and Tommy Harper producing for Jackson Pictures. Anne Hathaway was cast in the lead role.

By February 2024, it was revealed that Ewan McGregor had been cast, with Maisy Stella and Christian Convery joining in March. In late March, the title was revealed to be Flowervale Street. In April, Jordan Alexa Davis, P. J. Byrne and Chris Coy joined the cast.

In January 2026, Warner Bros. Motion Picture Group co-chairs Pamela Abdy and Michael De Luca revealed that the film would be getting a new title. In March 2026, with the release of the trailer, the official title was announced to be The End of Oak Street.

=== Filming ===
Principal photography began on March 22, 2024, in London and Atlanta, and wrapped on June 4. Filming on soundstages took place at Electric Owl Studios in DeKalb County while location filming in Atlanta was used to represent Oak Street. The production chose to film on Westwood Avenue SW, Erin Avenue SW, Dover Boulevard SW, Howell Drive SW, and Manford Road SW due to their detached houses, broad lawns and mature trees that were typical of American suburbs during the 1980s when the film is set.

=== Post-production ===
As with the Jurassic Park franchise, Industrial Light & Magic became the lead visual effects vendor and handled the creation of the dinosaurs for the film. Jay Cooper served as Production VFX Supervisor.

=== Music ===
In March 2026, it was announced that Michael Giacchino would compose the score. The soundtrack album contains 27 cues and was released on August 7, 2026.

== Release ==
=== Marketing ===
The film's marketing campaign was criticized on social media for using generative AI. In particular, a now-deleted video shared by Warner Bros. featured the dog Starbuck from the film interviewed in the AI-generated dog podcast Goldie & Frenchie, owned by DogPack, a social media platform tailored to dog owners.

=== Theatrical ===
The End of Oak Street had its world premiere at the Steven J. Ross Theater on August 9, 2026, and was released theatrically in the United States on August 14 by Warner Bros. Pictures. The film's release was previously scheduled for May 16, 2025, and March 13, 2026. The postponements were due to Bad Robot head Hannah Minghella leaving her position during post-production of the film and not being replaced, causing a leadership gap that hindered the film's completion, as well as Hathaway being unavailable when additional photography was required for the film, as she was involved in filming for Christopher Nolan's film The Odyssey; these factors caused the post-production of The End of Oak Street to be suspended for six months.

=== Home media ===
The End of Oak Street released on Digital HD on September 13, 2026 and on DVD, Blu-ray, and Ultra HD Blu-ray on November 3, 2026.

== Reception ==
=== Box office ===
The End of Oak Street grossed $54 million in the United States and Canada, and $67 million in other territories, for a worldwide total of $122 million. The film was produced on a budget of $80–92 million. Due to its high production and marketing costs, Variety estimated the film would lose Warner Bros. $25–40 million from its theatrical run.

In the U.S. and Canada, The End of Oak Street was released alongside Paw Patrol: The Dino Movie and The Brink of War, and was projected to gross $20–25 million from 3,446 theaters in its opening weekend. The film made $7.9 million (including $2 million from Thursday previews) on its first day. It went on to debut to $21 million, finishing in third at the box office.

=== Critical response ===
On the review aggregator website Rotten Tomatoes, 86% of 350 critics' reviews are positive, with an average rating of 7.0/10. The website's consensus reads: "Tapping into the primal pleasures of the classic creature feature, The End of Oak Street is pulpy good fun carried off with a light touch and a sharp bite." Metacritic, which uses a weighted average, assigned the film a score of 69 out of 100, based on 52 critics, indicating "generally favorable" reviews. Audiences polled by CinemaScore gave the film an average grade of "B" on an A+ to F scale.

Zachary Lee of RogerEbert.com awarded The End of Oak Street four out of four, praising its combination of family drama, apocalyptic imagery, and dinosaur horror. He highlighted the film's themes of family secrets and parental sacrifice, while calling it "the most thrilling dinosaur movie in ages". Jake Coyle of the Associated Press praised the film's mixture of science fiction, horror, and 1980s adventure-film influences, as well as the performances of Anne Hathaway and Ewan McGregor. Clarisse Loughrey of The Independent was similarly enthusiastic, describing the film as "better than any of the Jurassic World films" and praising Mitchell's use of influences from films such as Jurassic Park and E.T. the Extra-Terrestrial. Nikki Baughan of Screen Daily gave the film a positive review, calling it a "fun, fast-paced creature feature", also noting that it "draws effectively on classic Spielbergian adventures" and that "most of the film plays like Jurassic Park on steroids".

Some reviews were more mixed. David Rooney of The Hollywood Reporter described the film as "high-end trash", acknowledging its entertainment value while criticizing its reliance on 1980s Amblin-style nostalgia. Likewise, Amy Nicholson wrote in the Los Angeles Times that the Spielbergian influences would "almost satisfy our thwarted hopes for Steven Spielberg's own Disclosure Day" if Mitchell's script "wasn't such a groaner". She wrote that The End of Oak Street is emblematic of Mitchell "need[ing] to prove he can make a big-budget crowd-pleaser" while not capturing the same mood as his earlier work. Peter Bradshaw gave the film a two-star review in The Guardian, concluding that the film's Spielberg influences do not "feel like homage so much as a pastiche produced by an AI Spielbergbot". Cary Darling in the Houston Chronicle praised the film's dinosaur effects, pacing, and performances, but criticized its plot holes and occasionally illogical character decisions.
