= Best.Worst.Weekend.Ever. =

- Genre: Coming-of-age; Comedy
- Created by: Robin J. Stein; Daniel Bryan Franklin; Jeremy Garelick
- Directed by: Jeremy Garelick
- Starring: Sam Ashe Arnold; Cole Sand; Brianna Reed; Brittany Garms
- Composers: Christopher Lennertz; Matt Bowen
- Country of origin: United States
- Original language: English
- No. of seasons: 1
- No. of episodes: 8

Production
- Executive producers: Jeremy Garelick; Daniel Bryan Franklin; Dan Cross; Dave Hoge; Leah Keith; Fernando Szew; Robyn Snyder; Michael McGahey
- Producer: Philip Waley
- Cinematography: Bradford Lipson
- Editors: Mark Stevens; Ian Kezsbom
- Running time: 22–27 minutes
- Production company: MarVista Entertainment

Original release
- Network: Netflix
- Release: October 19, 2018

Best. Worst. Weekend. Ever. is a coming-of-age comedy television series. The limited series consists of eight episodes. It was released on October 19, 2018 on Netflix.

== Cast ==
- Sam Ashe Arnold as Zed Novak
- Cole Sand as Argo Andropolis
- Brianna Reed as Treece Dombrowski
- Brittany Garms as Hallie, Treece's stepsister

== Episodes ==
No.	Title	Directed by	Written by	Original release date
1	"Issue 1"	Jeremy Garelick	Story by : Robin J. Stein & Daniel Bryan Franklin & Jeremy Garelick; Teleplay by : Jeremy Garelick	October 19, 2018
Comic book fans Zed, Argo, and Treece find out that their town is hosting their first ever Comic-Con. On the day of Comic-Con, Zed acts like Argo's dad, Coronel Andropolis, and cancels his plans with Argo's babysitter, Beth, while Treece acts like Beth and tells Coronel Andropolis that she's too sick to babysit. While Coronel Andropolis breaks the news to Argo, he accidentally steps on Argo's Comic-Con pass and Argo fails to get it back. They plan to show Issue 94 of their favorite comic book, Starcrasher, to its author, H.L Cross, after he stopped writing them 20 years ago. When Argo breaks the news to Treece and Zed, Zed makes a plan and brings Treece's step-sister, Hallie, as she's the only one with a driver's license. At the entrance of Comic-Con, Zed and Treece cause a distraction so Argo and Hallie can sneak in. They are caught and blacklisted from Comic-Con for life. Zed plans a "literary event" at Argo's house in order to attract H.L Cross. The "literary event" turns into a full blown party. In the morning, Zed wakes up to find the house messed up and Hallie in the ceiling. They find Argo missing, but he wakes up in the woods and encounters a bear.
2	"Issue 2"	Jeremy Garelick	Jeremy Garelick	October 19, 2018
When Zed was a kid, his dad had left him the first issue of Starcrasher before died. He encounters Argo and Treece and they head into a comic book store called Pegasus, thus forming the Crash Crew. In the present, the Crash Crew call Argo's phone using a permaphone, but they find it rigged to the nanny cam. They use collectors com sets and split up to find Argo, who is to FaceTime with his dad in 2 hours. They get picked up by Hallie in her car, which she won at poker during the "literary event". In the woods, Argo continues to run from the bear and ends up in a cabin. They find Argo in the trunk with VR glasses. They head home to find the house cleaned up by some kids Zed hired, who stored the cotton candy inside the fireplace. Argo FaceTimes with his dad. Argo has an allergic reaction to honey on a donut which causes his lip to swell up. Argo's dog, Tom Dunkins, is nowhere to be found. In the desert, Zed's juvenile brother, Patches, escapes from juvenile detention.
3	"Issue 3"	Jeremy Garelick	Thomas Beecher & Jacob Fleisher	October 19, 2018
When Argo's dad got stationed overseas, Tom Dunkins was the only thing to keep Argo happy. When he returned, he found out that Argo didn't have anything in common with him. The Crash Crew split up to find Tom Dunkins, with no luck. They head to a pet store to find Tom Dunkins using a tracker Coronel Andropolis placed on him. Argo distracts the owner while Treece and Zed try to find out the code of Tom Dunkin's tracker. While Argo gets a haircut, Zed finds Tom Dunkin's location and prints it out, sneaking past the barber to the printer. Meanwhile, Patches breaks into Argo's house to find a mushroom plush. They head into a Blade of Dragons maze to find Tom Dunkins and pass out flyers. Zed and Argo cut through the line and encounter one of Zed's old enemies, Max. When he refuses to let The Crash Crew cut in line, Hallie pops his pee pants, causing chaos in the line, allowing for them to sneak by. Inside the maze, they accidentally split up. At the end of the maze, they head into an escape room and confront a guy who had stolen Tom Dunkins' collar. In the maze, Patches confronts Zed.
4	"Issue 4"	Jeremy Garelick	Jacob Fleisher & Thomas Beecher	October 19, 2018
Argo fails to conquer his fear of singing in public. Patches questions Zed about his mushroom plush. Hallie maces Patches and rescues Zed. Outside of Comic Con, Treece's soccer buddy, Chloe, heads into Comic Con to find Tom Dunkins. Agents lurk around Comic Con looking for Patches, who is searching for Zed. The team reunites with Zed, who plans to sneak into Comic Con through the hotel's service entrance. Using disguises, Zed acts like a hotel guest and gets hotel room keys. They bust into the kitchen of the hotel restaurant. The workers ask the group if Argo is Jumping Jack Lightning, a video game character hosting an event at the convention. Argo pretends to be JJL, where he is taken to the roof of the hotel and accidentally falls 12 stories onto a mat, mistaking the stunt jump as a singing event. Argo and Zed are taken by security and Treece, Hallie, and Chloe run away looking for Tom Dunkins, whom she spotted in the audience. Argo spots Tom Dunkins before he is taken into a room with Zed.
5	"Issue 5"	Jeremy Garelick	Robin J. Stein & Daniel Bryan Franklin	October 19, 2018
After Patches steals Starcrasher Issue 1 from Pegasus, he is sent to juvenile detention. Argo and Zed are confronted by agents looking for digilord, the most dangerous hacker in the world. They are separated and questioned. Meanwhile, Hallie continues searching for Zed and Argo. Patches lures Treece to the hotel roof and tells her to tell Zed to have his mushroom plush delivered at his father's gravestone by noon. Treece agrees as Patches has kidnapped Tom Dunkins in retaliation. Zed rescues Argo and they both climb into a vent. When Hallie passes by, her use of the crash com alerts the agents to Zed and Argo's location, prompting him to use a toy car and duct tape to send the taped crash com down the vent using the car. When Zed and Argo try to alert Hallie that they are stuck inside the vent, the vent comes crashing down, landing them inside a trash compactor, unbeknownst to them. Meanwhile, Treece finds out that Patches has trashed Argo's house. Hallie uses a disguise to hid from the agents, who are busy roaming around Comic Con looking for Zed and Argo.
6	"Issue 6"	Jeremy Garelick	Robin J. Stein & Daniel Bryan Franklin	October 19, 2018
Argo and Treece read Starcrasher Issue 41 while Zed is visiting his grandma. Meanwhile, Hallie rescues Jumping Jack Lighting from his bus and he thanks her by giving her his bus, revealing that he is miserable as Jumping Jack Lighting. While Zed and Argo confide in each other, the walls of the trash compactor start closing in. Patches shows Digilord the unreleased game teaser of Jumping Jack Lighting 2, but he demands the full game. While the walls of the trash compactor close in, Zed and Argo tell each other their deepest secrets, revealing that Argo and Treece read Issue 41 with Zed. As Argo reveals he likes Treece, she rescues them by turning off the trash compactor. As the kids walk outside by the parking lot, Hallie picks them up in the bus. They visit the woman Zed sold the mushroom plush to and cut her fingernails to get the plush back. When Zed gives Patches the plush, he rips out a bacon USB, but Tom Dunkins accidentally eats it, pushing Patches to keep him in retaliation. Back home, the kids get into an argument leading Treece to reveal that they only brought Hallie along for her car. Hallie runs out, but Zed comforts her. When he accidentally kneels on the bus lever, Hallie drives the bus into Argo's living room. When the bus' firework cannons hit the cotton candy, it starts to shoot out of the fireplace.
7	"Issue 7"	Jeremy Garelick	Aaron Cooley & Taylor Vaughn Lasley	October 19, 2018
outside, the kids watch the "firework show", but Coronel Andropolis starts to call, forcing Zed to answer. When he hears Zed's voice, Coronel Andropolis states he is gonna be home in 2 hours 45 minutes. The rest of the kids head home with no plan in motion. When Zed finds Patches in his room, he finds out about his plan to sell the full Jumping Jack Lighting to Digilord. He retaliates, forcing Patches to push him to the floor, and he escapes from the window. Hallie confronts Treece about the fight, but Zed bursts into Treece's backyard, telling her he knows where to find Tom Dunkins, who ran away from Patches. A man in a costume takes him from the kids' hideout, underneath the bleachers, and into a keep, where the "Groucho Monks" plan to overtake Vortessa, Starcrasher's enemy. As Zed and Treece stumble into the battlegrounds, a fight ensues between the two armies. Zed and Treece are confronted by the security guards from Comic Con, who reveal that the event is a fictional LARPing event, which they seem to take part in outside of their jurisdiction. As Zed and Treece seem to be overpowered, Hallie arrives and takes down the Monks using her plastic hammer. Hallie is taken down by Vortessa, who confronts Zed. As Zed is defeated, Treece hits Vortessa with a plastic grenade she picked up earlier, and she rescues Tom Dunkins. They reunite with Argo back home, while Zed hatches a plan.
8	"Issue 8"	Jeremy Garelick	Dave Hoge & Dan Cross	October 19, 2018
As celebrity Kaley Cuoco gets food poisoning, H.L Cross steps in as one of the panelists at Comic Con. As they get the news, the kids find out that there is a competition for best comic book story with the prize of $50,000. Zed plans to show their Issue 94 of Starcrasher and to fix the house with the money. At Comic Con, Argo tells one of the security guards their story in order to get passes. Feeling emotion, she gives them passes and the kids manage to evade the security guards from the LARPing event. Argo's dad arrives at the house to find Zed's mom looking for him. He knows where they are, revealing he kept the pass that got stuck to his shoe. At the event, Zed is allowed to pitch his story, but learns that the story must be original. However, the kids come up with a story using their adventures throughout the season. Afterwards, Argo confronts his dad, who hugs him after learning about the accident. They also learn that the agents have managed to capture Digilord and Patches, who only has to serve what is left of his sentence after ratting out Digilord to the police. They learn that the barber who cut Argo's hair won, but the kids get to meet H.L Cross afterwards, who makes a comic book about the kids' adventures after getting a buyer's deal on the market. On the first day of high school, Treece makes the soccer team, Zed runs for president, Argo enjoys the magnet program, and Hallie defers Harvard to stay with Treece, who finally accepts her as her sister. Under the bleachers, the kids get ready to read their comic book.
