= Rolling Loud: The Movie =

- Theatrical release poster
- Directed by: Jeremy Garelick
- Written by: Jeremy Garelick
- Produced by: Jeremy Garelick; Will Phelps; Stella Bulochnikov; Jolene Blalock
- Starring: Owen Wilson; Matt Rife; Christine Ko; Christian Convery; Henry Winkler; Jolene Blalock; Travis Scott
- Cinematography: Bradford Lipson
- Edited by: Zene Baker
- Music by: Chanda Dancy
- Production companies: Live Nation Productions; American High; Pat Solitano Productions
- Distributed by: Ketchup Entertainment
- Release date: October 2, 2026
- Running time: 95 minutes
- Country: United States
- Language: English
- Box office: $1 million

Rolling Loud: The Movie is a 2026 American comedy film written and directed by Jeremy Garelick. The film stars Owen Wilson, Matt Rife, Christine Ko, Christian Convery, Henry Winkler, and Jolene Blalock alongside musical guests such as Sexyy Red, Ty Dolla Sign, Ski Mask the Slump God, and Travis Scott.

== Plot ==
Hank Goldstone is a mild-mannered employee at furniture company Raynard & Ferguson, husband to his wife Melanie, and father to his 13-year-old son Zion. Zion is a fan of hip-hop music, and desperately appeals to his parents to attend the Rolling Loud music festival. Initially, Hank and Melanie refuse, but Hank eventually relents and buys tickets. Melanie is not convinced, leading Hank to lie to her, telling her that he is taking Zion to the family cabin, but surprising Zion by heading to Rolling Loud instead.

At the festival, the two are initially turned away, as Zion is too young to attend. Hank lies and says that he is 16 to get past security. While Zion is in the bathroom, Hank has a chance meeting with his eccentric coworker Terry, who is also his boss’s son. Hank and Terry eat lunch together, but Hank becomes concerned when Zion does not return from the bathroom, and is unable to contact him due to the festival’s poor cell phone service. With Terry tagging along, Hank searches for Zion. During the search, Hank takes a call from Melanie in a karaoke booth that is overheard and filmed by a crowd outside.

Hank eventually goes to security, who question Hank about Zion’s real age and threaten to call child protective services. Terry appears with a stage pyrotechnic device, distracting security long enough for the two of them to escape. While hiding, they are offered help by volunteer Linda, who also gives them drugs, unbeknownst to Hank. The three head to Sexyy Red’s performance hoping to find Zion; Hank believes he briefly catches sight of him, but is forced to flee from security before they can reunite. Instead, the group rides a Ferris wheel hoping to spot Zion from the air. They meet partiers Brittany and Tiffany, but do not find Zion until Hank sees a social media post leading them towards Ski Mask the Slump God’s set. As Hank tries to climb off the Ferris wheel, he accidentally knocks Linda off, but her fall is broken by an attendee in a wheelchair.

At Ski Mask’s performance, a distracted Hank fails to catch a crowdsurfer, and is yelled at by other attendees while performing CPR, then is doused with hot coffee by a hallucinating Terry and Linda. While he recovers, Hank receives a call from Melanie, who questions why Zion is tagged in a social media post from Rolling Loud with Travis Scott; Hank again lies, assuring her they are at the cabin. After contacting Brittany and Tiffany to help them get into the artists-only area of the festival, a run-in with security leads Terry and Linda to create distractions, with Terry spraying himself with pepper spray and Linda stripping naked to attract the guards’ attention. Backstage, Hank runs into Sexxy Red. She initially questions him, as the crowdsurfer Hank dropped earlier was one of her friends, but eventually agrees to take him to Travis Scott. Travis is dubious, but warms up to Hank due to his love of Raynard & Ferguson furniture. He agrees to help find Zion, and Hank is able to free Terry and Linda from security.

The group heads to Travis Scott’s set, where Hank catches sight of Zion enjoying the show with his classmate Gwen. Seeing that he is happy and safe, Hank lets him continue having fun, but is soon pulled on-stage to perform “Fein” with Travis, where an amazed Zion sees him and runs over to him. The two reconcile, and Zion shares a kiss with Gwen, but the two must quickly depart after Melanie tells Hank she is coming to join them at the cabin. With Hank still under the effects of Linda’s drugs, Zion is forced to drive. The two make it to the cabin just in time, with Melanie none the wiser.

In a mid-credits scene, Hank receives a FaceTime call from his boss, who tells him that Travis Scott has made a large furniture purchase, leading Hank to receive a raise. Melanie is initially thrilled, but then sees incriminating texts on Hank’s phone, exposing the whole deception.

== Cast ==
- Owen Wilson as Hank
- Matt Rife as Terry
- Christine Ko as Linda
- Christian Convery as Zion
- Olivia Luccardi as Brittany
- Henry Winkler as Ferguson
- Jolene Blalock as Melanie
- Sexyy Red as herself
- Ty Dolla Sign as himself
- Ski Mask the Slump God as himself
- Travis Scott as himself

== Production ==
In December 2024, Owen Wilson and Matt Rife were announced as the stars of the Rolling Loud film with Christian Convery and Christine Ko joining the cast shortly after. In March 2025, Sexyy Red, Henry Winkler, Ty Dolla $ign, and Ski Mask the Slump God were added to the cast. Filming began in December 2024, with scenes featuring Wilson's character shot on location at the Rolling Loud music festival in Miami. Additional production took place in Atlanta in early 2025. Bradford Lipson served as the cinematographer.

On May 18, 2026, the first teaser from the film was released. Travis Scott's appearance in the teaser sparked controversy in the wake of the fatal crowd crush which occurred at Scott's Astroworld Festival in Houston on November 5, 2021. Fans pointed out the similarities between the film's premise and the previous tragedy and suggested that the film was an attempt to distract from web searches related to the crowd crush, noting that the co-organizer of Astroworld Festival, Live Nation, was involved with the film's production.

Chanda Dancy was hired to compose the score.

== Release ==
Rolling Loud was released in the United States on October 2, 2026 by Ketchup Entertainment. It was previously scheduled for September 18, 2026.

Rolling Loud was released by Amazon Prime Video and iTunes for digital purchase on November 17, 2026.
