= Catherine McCafferty =

American comedian and actress

- Education: Loyola University Chicago
- Occupations: Comedian; actress
- Years active: 2012–present
- Website: www.catherinemccafferty.com

Catherine McCafferty is an American comedian and actress. She is the creator and host of the web series Pretty Gay.

== Life and career ==
McCafferty grew up in Chicago, and was raised Irish Catholic. She graduated from Loyola University Chicago, where she majored in biology. After her graduation, she made her professional stage debut in The Birds at Hell in a Handbag Productions, playing Tippi Hedren in the campy show about the making of the 1960s film. She also began performing stand-up comedy in Chicago.

McCafferty moved to Los Angeles to further her career, where she initially "lived in a hostel [and] had 100 different jobs". In 2018, she co-created and co-starred in the web series Bothered. In 2022, she appeared in the comedy films Crush and American Carnage. In 2024, she performed an hour-long dark comedy show, (Not) That Bad, at the Edinburgh Festival Fringe.

McCafferty became known as the creator and host of the web series Pretty Gay, an interview/mock dating show featuring primarily LGBTQ female and non-binary guests. Released on Patreon, the show was produced by Sam Reich and Elaine Carroll and the first season was filmed in their house. By 2026, the show had gained McCafferty over 600,000 followers and millions of views across Instagram, TikTok, and YouTube.

== Health ==
In 2026, McCafferty announced that she has been diagnosed with celiac disease and collagenous colitis.
