= The Binge =

2020 American comedy film directed by Jeremy Garelick

- Official release poster
- Directed by: Jeremy Garelick
- Written by: Jordan VanDina
- Produced by: Jeremy Garelick; Mickey Liddell; Pete Shilaimon; Will Phelps; Ryan Bennett; Michael Schade
- Starring: Skyler Gisondo; Eduardo Franco; Dexter Darden; Vince Vaughn; Grace Van Dien; Zainne Saleh
- Cinematography: Andrew Huebscher
- Edited by: Waldemar Centeno; Ian Kezsbom
- Music by: Matt Bowen
- Production companies: LD Entertainment; American High
- Distributed by: Hulu
- Release date: August 28, 2020
- Running time: 98 minutes
- Country: United States
- Language: English

The Binge is a 2020 American parody film directed by Jeremy Garelick and written by Jordan VanDina. A parody of The Purge, the film stars Skyler Gisondo, Eduardo Franco, Dexter Darden, Vince Vaughn, Grace Van Dien and Zainne Saleh.

The Binge was released in the United States on August 28, 2020, by Hulu. The film received generally negative reviews from critics, although the performances of the cast, especially Vaughn's, were praised.

A Christmas-themed sequel, It's a Wonderful Binge, was released on December 9, 2022, by Hulu.

== Plot ==
Following a series of accidents, the United States congress prohibits all alcohol and drugs. However, there is one day titled the Binge, where alcohol and drugs are permitted for 12 hours.

In 2032, high school friends, Griffin, Andrew, and Hags, prepare for the arrival of the Binge. The group visit Seb, Andrew's brother, to acquire wristbands to go to a Binge party. They then go to Sarah's home, where they take a ride at her limo. During their ride, they try cigarettes for the first time offered by the limo's driver, Pompano Mike. However, during the night, the group are kicked out after accidentally hitting a cow.

Seb arrives, and takes the group to a restaurant. There, the group eats a big amount of burritos spiked with magic mushrooms. The group reaches the party, where El Pantera, the Binge legend, is competing at the games. The group wins the games, and Hags becomes a Binge legend. After the day is over, Griffin develops a relationship with Lena.

== Cast ==
- Skyler Gisondo as Griffin
- Eduardo Franco as Andrew
- Dexter Darden as Hags
- Vince Vaughn as Principal Carlsen
- Grace Van Dien as Lena Carlsen
- Zainne Saleh as Sarah Martin
- Marta Piekarz as Kimmi
- Ian Soares as Mark Maynard
- Zakary Odrzykowski as Student
- Joel Carlino as Student
- Hayes MacArthur as Mike "Pompano Mike"
- Tony Cavalero as Mike "Pompano Mike"
- Affion Crockett as Boomer
- Nicky Whelan as Punisher
- Nikki Leigh as Alexa
- Jasmine Millner as Student

== Production ==
In September 2019, it was announced Skyler Gisondo, Eduardo Franco, Dexter Darden, Vince Vaughn, Grace Van Dien and Zainne Saleh had joined the cast of the film, with Jeremy Garelick directing from a screenplay by Jordan VanDina, with LD Entertainment and American High producing, and Hulu distributing.

=== Filming ===
Principal photography began in September 2019 in Syracuse, New York.

== Release ==
The Binge was released on Hulu in the United-States on August 28, 2020.

== Reception ==
On review aggregator Rotten Tomatoes, the film holds an approval rating of 22% based on 27 reviews, with an average rating of 4.6/10. The website's critics consensus reads: "The Binge starts out with the promise of a fun time, but gets sloppy on bottom-shelf humor and stumbles face down into the gutter." On Metacritic, the film has a weighted average score of 35 out of 100, based on 10 critics, indicating "generally unfavorable" reviews.

John DeFore of The Hollywood Reporter praised the performances of the cast, especially Vince Vaughn's part, despite stating that the characters have generally no outstanding or unusual characteristics, and that Jordan VanDina's script delivers absurdities, which leaves some questions unanswered. Bill Goodykoontz of The Arizona Republic rated the movie three out of five stars, found Vaughn's part as one of the best aspects of the film through the personality of his character, and praised the depiction of a strong friendship between the characters, but stated that the film still fails to deliver enough good jokes.

Molly Freeman of Screen Rant rated the movie two and a half out of five stars, found the premise of the movie quick and easy to apprehend, and complimented how the characters explore their world, but claimed that the film lacks an entertaining story, while finding the characters being undeveloped to be satisfying enough. Tomris Laffly of RogerEbert.com rated the film two out of four stars, praised the complicity between the main characters and the sense of humor of the movie, but stated that Vaughn's shy performance as the villain is barely remarkable, and that the movie does not deliver enough humorous scenes for a comedy film.

== Sequel ==
A Christmas-themed sequel, It's a Wonderful Binge, was released on December 9, 2022. The film was directed by Jordan VanDina, and stars Kaitlin Olson, Tim Meadows, Eduardo Franco, Danny Trejo, and Dexter Darden.
