= American Carnage =

- Poster
- Directed by: Diego Hallivis
- Written by: Diego Hallivis; Julio Hallivis
- Produced by: Diego Hallivis; Julio Hallivis; Andres Rosende
- Starring: Jorge Lendeborg Jr.; Jenna Ortega; Eric Dane
- Cinematography: Unax Mendia
- Edited by: Alex Márquez
- Music by: Nima Fakhrara
- Production companies: Xolo Productions; The Hallivis Brothers
- Distributed by: Saban Films
- Release date: July 15, 2022
- Running time: 101 minutes
- Countries: United States, Spain
- Language: English

American Carnage is a 2022 American comedy horror film written by Diego Hallivis and Julio Hallivis, directed by Diego Hallivis and starring Jorge Lendeborg Jr., Jenna Ortega and Eric Dane. The film has a political message in favor of immigrant rights and takes its name from a line from Donald Trump's first inaugural speech.

== Cast ==
- Jorge Lendeborg Jr. as JP
- Jenna Ortega as Camila
- Allen Maldonado as Big Mac
- Yumarie Morales as Lily
- Jorge Diaz as Chris
- Bella Ortiz as Micah
- Eric Dane as Eddie
- Brett Cullen as Harper Finn
- Catherine McCafferty as Cynthia
- Andrew Kaempfer as Bruce
- Alexis Nicolas Jara as Inmate Leader
- Suni Reyes as Emilia
- Yvonne Miranda as TV Reporter
- José Luis Villalba as Police officer

== Release ==
The film was released in theaters and on demand on July 15, 2022.

== Reception ==
The film has a 58% rating on Rotten Tomatoes based on 24 reviews.

Matt Donato of IGN rated the film a 6 and wrote, "With shades of Get Out, Culture Shock, and The Forever Purge, American Carnage is yet another frightening-enough, albeit bogged-down, tale about how the American Dream is no longer for everyone."

Leigh Monson of The A.V. Club graded the film a B and wrote, "Suffice it to say that the film doesn’t reach the stylistic or narrative highs of its obvious predecessor, but if it’s not quite Get Out, the Hallivis Brothers translate issues facing Hispanic Americans to a horror scenario well worth getting into."

Alex Saveliev of Film Threat rated the film a 5 out of 10 and wrote, "American Carnage has its eye on the right target; it just misses the bull’s eye."

Noel Murray of the Los Angeles Times gave the film a positive review, calling it "a lively, impassioned and only slightly exaggerated take on how some people use anti-immigrant sentiment to distract from their own monstrous crimes."
