= Barron's Cove =

- Directed by: Evan Ari Kelman
- Written by: Evan Ari Kelman
- Starring: Garrett Hedlund; Hamish Linklater; Brittany Snow; Christian Convery; Tramell Tillman; Raul Castillo; Stephen Lang
- Distributed by: Well Go USA Entertainment
- Release date: October 6, 2024
- Running time: 116 minutes
- Country: United States
- Language: English

Barron's Cove is a 2024 American crime drama thriller mystery film written and directed by Evan Ari Kelman and starring Garrett Hedlund, Hamish Linklater, Brittany Snow, Christian Convery, Tramell Tillman, Raul Castillo and Stephen Lang. It is Kelman's feature directorial debut.

Its plot follows Caleb Faulkner, who after his son is killed, abducts the child responsible, hellbent on revenge.

== Cast ==
- Garrett Hedlund as Caleb Faulkner
- Hamish Linklater as Lyle Chambers
- Brittany Snow as Jackie
- Stephen Lang as Benji, Caleb's uncle
- Christian Convery as Ethan Chambers
- Tramell Tillman as Felix
- Raúl Castillo as Navarro

== Production ==
Evan Ari Kelman began developing the screenplay during the COVID-19 pandemic as a personal exploration of grief and fatherhood. The story originated from a tragic news article about teenage violence.

The project was the culmination of six years of development, evolving from an initial script submission to the Academy Nicholl Fellowship (where it became a semifinalist) and earning early attention from Mandalay Pictures, which helped launch production.

The screenplay was included on the 2021 annual Black List of most-liked unproduced screenplays.

In May 2023, it was announced that Snow, Hedlund, Lang and Linklater were cast in the film.

== Release ==
In February 2025, it was announced that Well Go USA Entertainment acquired North American distribution rights to the film, which premiered at the 2024 Hamptons International Film Festival. The film was released in theaters and on VOD on June 6, 2025.

== Reception ==
On the review aggregator website Rotten Tomatoes, 62% of 26 critics' reviews are positive. Metacritic, which uses a weighted average, assigned the film a score of 61 out of 100, based on 5 critics, indicating "generally favorable" reviews.

Tim Cogshell of LAist’s Filmweek rated the film positively, saying, "this is just damn good and so unnerving." On Common Sense Media, Monique Jones rated it 3/5 stars writing that "the entire plot of Barron's Cove hinges on violence toward kids (...) But if that warning doesn't dissuade you from watching the film, you'll find that it has compelling performances."

Nell Minow of RogerEbert.com, who gave the film two stars out of four, wrote that "while there is a sole writer/director (Evan Ari Kelman), the list of almost 30 producers may be a clue to the film’s uncertain shifts in tone." Alex Saveliev of Film Threat gave it 5 out of 10, writing in his review consensus section: : "should've explored what drives these characters to these unspeakable acts." Also on Film Threat, Kent Hill rated it 8/10, and wrote: "raw-edged intensity coupled with heart and meaning."

== See also ==
- List of American films of 2024
- List of drama films of the 2020s
- List of thriller films of the 2020s
- List of mystery films
