= Eduardo Franco (actor) =

American actor (born 1994)

- Franco in 2026
- Born: August 29, 1994 (age 32); Yuma, Arizona, U.S.
- Occupations: Actor; comedian
- Years active: 2015–present

Eduardo Franco (born August 29, 1994) is an American actor and comedian. He is best known for his roles as Argyle in the Netflix series Stranger Things, Theo in the film Booksmart, DJ Catnip in Gabby's Dollhouse, and Spencer Diaz in the mockumentary series American Vandal. He is also a member of the musical duo "Dumb Bitches w/ Internet" with Noetic Nixon.

== Early life ==
Franco was born in the city of Yuma, Arizona. He was raised in a working class family by Mexican parents.

== Career ==
Franco first started acting in a number of television comedies. He played the role of Gavis in the Adam Ruins Everything episode "Adam Ruins Dating" which aired on August 1, 2017. His first major credit was as Spencer Diaz in the first season of the 2017 Netflix comedy American Vandal. In 2019, he had a supporting role in the critically acclaimed comedy film Booksmart. He also appeared in several nationwide commercials, including spots for GEICO, Samsung, and TurboTax. In 2020, Franco starred in a lead role as Andrew in the Hulu movie The Binge.

In 2022, Franco gained notability for playing Argyle, a stoner friend of Jonathan Byers, in the fourth season of Stranger Things. Franco initially auditioned for the role of Eddie Munson. Franco said he was not invited to reprise the role in the following season.

In 2026, it was announced that Franco would be joining the cast of DC Studios' The People v. Gorilla Grodd.

== Filmography ==
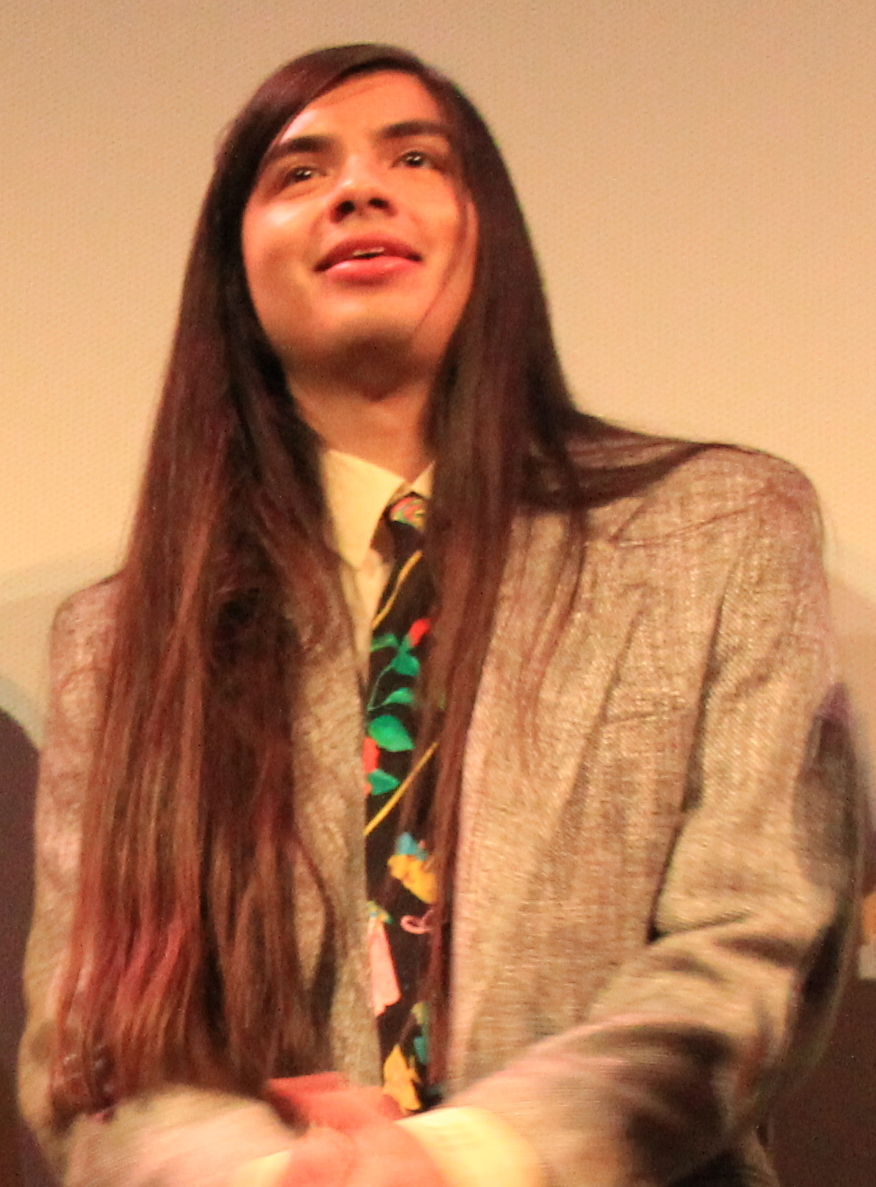
Franco at SXSW in 2019

Film

Year	Title	Role	Notes
2018	The Package	Jeremy Abelar	
2019	Booksmart	Theo	
2020	The Binge	Andrew	
2020	Superintelligence	Todd	
2021	We Broke Up	Mike	
2021	Queenpins	Greg	
2021	Koati	Pako (voice)	
2022	It's a Wonderful Binge	Andrew	
2023	Ruby Gillman, Teenage Kraken	Trevin (voice)	
2023	Self Reliance	P.A. Ninja	
2024	Y2K	Farkas	
2025	Gabby's Dollhouse: The Movie	DJ Catnip (voice)	
2026	Goat	Daryl (voice)	
2026	Hoppers	Loaf (voice)	
2026	Focker-in-Law	Eduardo Villalobos	
2027	Ice Age: Boiling Point	Bodi (voice)	

Television

Year	Title	Role	Notes
2015–17	Gamer's Guide to Pretty Much Everything	Stu	7 episodes
2015–17	Adam Ruins Everything	Gavis	4 episodes
2016	The Skinny	Jose	Episode: "Squad"
2016	You're the Worst	Justin	Episode: "The Inherent, Unsullied Qualitative Value of Anything"
2017	Lopez	Audience Member	Episode: "George Gets Schooled"
2017	Idiotsitter		3 episodes
2017	Good Game	Gamer	Episode: "Everyone Calls Everyone Else a Nazi"
2017	American Vandal	Spencer Diaz	Recurring (season 1); 6 episodes
2017	Lady Dynamite	Spider	Episode: "Goof Around Gang"
2018	The Cool Kids	Kevin the Delivery Clerk	Episode: "Pilot"
2019	Those Who Can't	Kevin	Episode: "You Can't Go Homecoming Again"
2019	Tacoma FD	Gas Mask Stoner	Episode: "A New Hope"
2020	Conan	Jacob the Intern	Episode: "Kumail Nanjiani"
2021–present	Gabby's Dollhouse	DJ Catnip (voice)	Main role
2022	Stranger Things	Argyle	Also starring (season 4); 8 episodes
2026	Beef	Eduardo	Episode: "I Am Killing My Flesh Without It"
TBA	The People v. Gorilla Grodd	TBA	Filming
