= Grace Reiter =

American comedian (born 2001)

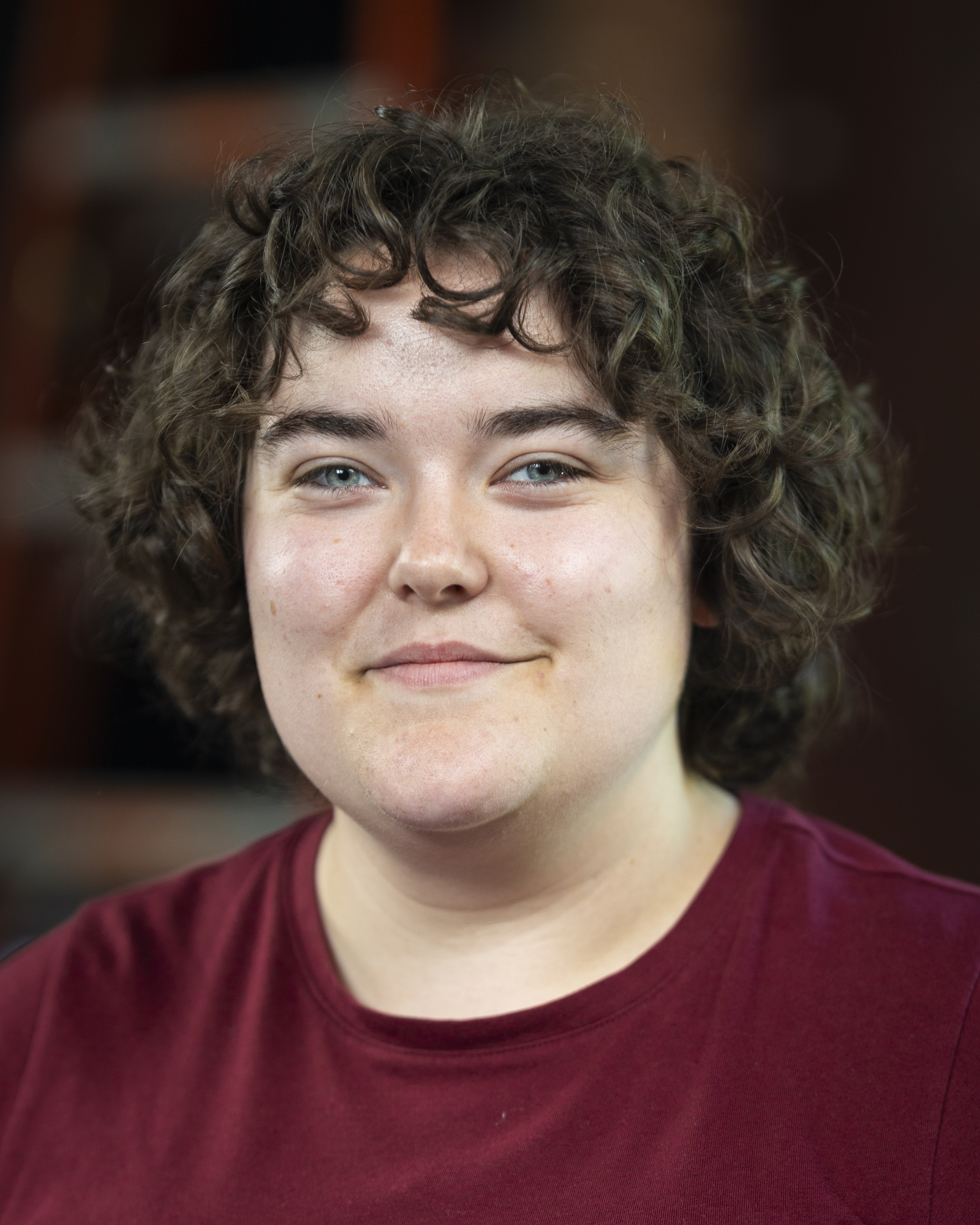
- Reiter in 2025
- Born: Grace Marie Reiter; May 18, 2001 (age 25); Madison, Wisconsin, U.S.
- Occupation: Comedian

TikTok information
- Page: Grace Reiter
- Followers: 4.1 million

YouTube information
- Channel: Grace Reiter
- Subscribers: 751 thousand
- Views: 146.0 million
- Last updated: October 30, 2026

Grace Marie Reiter (born May 18, 2001) is an American comedian. She first gained a following on TikTok in early 2019. Reiter is a cast member of American High's sketch comedy team, and stars in the HBO series The Chair Company. In September 2026, she joined the cast of Saturday Night Live for its 52nd season.

== Early life ==
Reiter was born in Madison, Wisconsin, the daughter of Timothy "Tim" Reiter and Valerie "Val" (née Cardinal). She has a younger sister, Molly, who has appeared with her in some of her online videos. Reiter was raised in Chippewa Falls, moving there with her family in 2007, and graduating from Chippewa Falls High School in 2019. Reiter attributes her comedic voice to the YouTube and influencer culture of her generation.

== Career ==
While in high school, Reiter began posting on TikTok; she became popular on the platform in January 2019. By 2022, she had roughly 1.7 million TikTok followers, and by late 2023 her following had grown to over 2 million. In June 2021, Reiter performed a stand-up routine on The Drew Barrymore Show as part of the show's Bananamore's segment. In early 2022, Reiter debuted as one of the original cast members of the TikTok live sketch comedy show Stapleview; the cast included Jane Wickline, a future Saturday Night Live castmate of Reiter.

In late 2022, Reiter joined the core cast of actors to create daily short-form sketches under the banners American High Shorts and College Life. Reiter co-wrote the song "Single in Fall" with Matt Bowen for American High. In 2023, she made her film debut in First Time Female Director, a comedy film directed by Chelsea Peretti. In late 2024, Reiter launched her podcast That's Enough with Grace Reiter. That's Enough held a live podcast at Union Hall as part of the New York Comedy Festival in November 2025.

In 2025, she appeared in a recurring role in HBO's The Chair Company. In November 2025, she directed and starred in a parody of The Hunger Games, titled The Hunger Games (but better). The parody, which Reiter filmed with her friends in celebration of her 24th birthday, went viral. Following its success, Reiter announced that she would next release Twilight (but better), a parody of Twilight. Reiter has also guest starred in several YouTube and brand collaborations, including with the comedy band On Company Time in their music videos "Frictionless Wipe" and "Pop! Pop!", and Hot Topic in their TikTok based sitcom, Mall Rats.

From July to October 2025 at the Orpheum Theatre, Reiter appeared in the Off-Broadway comedy Ginger Twinsies, a parody of the 1998 film The Parent Trap, starring as Chessy and several other comedic roles.

In January 2026, Reiter announced that she is working on a comedy music album with her original character, Tate McRib, a parody of Tate McRae and the McRib. Her debut single "McRib" was released on June 20, 2026.

In April 2026, Netflix announced the 28-episode series Minimum Wage, adapted from American High's 2024 web series of the same name, with Reiter reprising her role as Grace. On August 20, it was announced that Reiter had taken part in a talent showcase to audition for Saturday Night Live for its upcoming 52nd season, and she subsequently joined the cast on September 16. With this hire, Reiter becomes the first cast member born in the 21st century.

== Filmography ==
=== Film ===
Key
†	Denotes films that have not yet been released

Year	Title	Role	Notes
2023	First Time Female Director	Protestor Rebecca	
2024	Prom Dates	Bartender at Warehouse	
2025	Summer of 69	Nerdy Gamer	
2025	The Hunger Games (but better)	Katniss Everdeen	Also director and writer
2026	Run Amok	Sue Ellen	
2027	Twilight (but better) †	—N/a	Director and writer

=== Television ===
Key
†	Denotes television productions that have not yet been released

Year	Title	Role	Notes	Ref(s)
2016	Flabulous	Ellie Brandt	Web series	
2022	Stapleview	Performer	Web series	
2024	Minimum Wage	Grace	Web series; Main role Director (episode: "The 12 Inch Challenge"); Writer (2 episodes)	
2025	The Chair Company	Tara	Recurring role (6 episodes)	
2025	Playwrights	Herself	Web series; episode: "My Ex Boyfriend and My Best Friend Are..."	
2026	Minimum Wage	Grace	Co-wrote and co-directed "Lottery Tickets"	
2026	Saturday Night Live	Herself	Cast member	

=== Music videos ===
Year	Song	Artist
2023	"Single in Fall"	American High
2025	"Frictionless Wipe"	On Company Time
2026	"Pop! Pop!"	On Company Time

== Discography ==
=== As lead artist ===
==== Singles ====
Year	Title	Album	Writer(s)	Producer(s)
2026	"McRib"	Tate McRib	Grace Reiter, Drew Louis, Michelle Zarlenga	Drew Louis, Michelle Zarlenga

=== As featured artist ===
==== Singles ====
Year	Title	Album	Writer(s)
2021	"Emerald Serenade" (Technicolor Dreamboat Original Cast, Baker, Kale Klein & Grace Reiter)	Technicolor Dreamboat (Original Cast Recording)	Emilie Grace Grimes, Isabelle Catherine Anne, Andrew Stephen Baker
2025	"Single In Fall" (American High Digital featuring Matt Bowen & Grace Reiter)	Non-album single	Matt Bowen, Grace Reiter
