= Jackpot =

Jackpot or Jackpot! may refer to:

== Comics ==
- Jackpot, a series of three Marvel Comics superheroes
- Jackpot (British comics), a 1979–1982 British comic book
- Jackpot Comics, a 1941 American comic book from MLJ Publications

== Film ==
- The Jackpot, a 1950 American comedy film directed by Walter Lang, starring James Stewart
- Jackpot (1960 film), a British B-movie crime film directed by Montgomery Tully
- Jackpot (unfinished film), an unfinished film, filmed from 1974–1975; directed by Terence Young and starring Richard Burton
- Jackpot (1992 film), an Italian sci-fi-adventure film directed by Mario Orfini
- Jackpot (1993 film), an Indian Malayalam-language film directed by Jomon
- Jackpot (2001 film), an American comedy-drama directed by Michael Polish
- Jackpot (2006 film), an Indian Kannada-language romantic-drama film directed by Niranjan
- Jackpot (2009 film), an Indian Bengali-language film directed by Kaushik Ganguly
- Jackpot (2011 film), a Norwegian crime comedy directed by Magnus Martens, adapted from an unpublished story by Jo Nesbø
- Jackpot (2013 film), an Indian Hindi-language comedy thriller directed by Kaizad Gustad
- Jackpot (2015 film), a Vietnamese film directed by Dustin Nguyen
- Jackpot (2018 film), a Pakistani romantic comedy film directed by Shoaib Khan
- Jackpot (2019 film), an Indian Tamil comedy film directed by Kalyaan
- Jackpot (2020 film), a German thriller film directed by Emily Atef
- Jackpot! (film), a 2024 American action comedy film directed by Paul Feig, starring Awkwafina

== Literature ==
- Jackpot, a 1990 novel by Bill Pronzini
- Jackpot!, a 1995 novel by Alan Hunter
- The Jackpot, an apocalyptic event in William Gibson's 2014 novel The Peripheral

== Music ==
- Jackpot (musical), a 1944 American musical
- Jackpot (Chingy album), 2003
- Jackpot! (Dave Brubeck album) or the title track, 1968
- Jackpot (Donna Ares album) or the title song, 2004
- Jackpot (Pietro Lombardi album), 2011
- Jackpot! The Best Bette, an album by Bette Midler, 2008
- Jackpot, an album by Jack the Lad, 1976
- "Jackpot" (Boyfriend song), by Boyfriend, 2016
- "Jackpot" (Belinda Peregrín and Kenia Os song), by Belinda and Kenia Os, 2024
- "Jackpot", a song by the Beat from I Just Can't Stop It
- "Jackpot", a song by Tocotronic
- "Jackpot", a song by Nikki Lane from Highway Queen
- "Jackpot", a song by Red Velvet from Bloom

== Television ==
- Jackpot (game show), an American and Canadian game show, in three different runs 1974–1990
- Jackpot (Irish TV series), a general knowledge quiz show 1962–1965
- Jackpot (1960 TV series), an Australian game show
- Jackpot (2016 TV series), a South Korean drama series
- "Jackpot" (CSI), an episode
- "Jackpot" (The Sweeney), an episode

== Other uses ==
- A prize, such as a progressive jackpot
- Gardena jackpots, a poker variant
- A ball game, also called 500, usually played informally
- Jackpot, Nevada, a community on the Nevada–Idaho state border

== See also ==
- Operation Jackpot, several military operations during the Bangladesh Liberation War
- Operation Jackpot (drug investigation), a federal task force during President Ronald Reagan's War on Drugs
- Operation Jackpot Nalli C.I.D 999, a 1969 Indian spy thriller film
- Jackpotting, the hacking of an ATM to release all its cash
- Jackpocket, Lottery app
