= Jackpot (Australian game show) =

- Genre: Game show
- Presented by: Bob McGready
- Country of origin: Australia
- Original language: English

Production
- Running time: 30 minutes

Original release
- Network: TCN-9
- Release: 1960 – 1961

Jackpot is an Australian television game show aired from 1960 to 1961 on Sydney station TCN-9. In a TV schedule from 1960, the series is listed at 1:30PM on Thursday, followed by The Happy Show with George Foster.

It was hosted by Bob McGready, who previously hosted by Balance Your Budget. It is not clear what connection there was between the two series. The actual gameplay of both series is not known, and the archival status is also not known.
