= Dexter Darden =

American actor

- Born: June 24, 1991 (age 35); Camden, New Jersey, U.S.
- Occupation: Actor
- Years active: 2008–present

Dexter Darden (born June 24, 1991) is an American actor.

== Career ==
Darden has performed in television and feature film roles. Some of his best known roles are: Walter Hill in Joyful Noise, Frypan in the Maze Runner film series, and Muhammad Ali in Fight Night: The Million Dollar Heist.

== Personal life ==
In December 2021, singer JoJo announced via an Instagram post that she and Darden were engaged to be married. The pair broke off their engagement the following year.

== Filmography ==
=== Films ===
List of films and roles
Year	Title	Role	Notes
2010	Standing Ovation	MC John	
2012	Joyful Noise	Walter Hill	
2013	Geography Club	Jared Sharp	
2014	The Maze Runner	Frypan	
2015	Maze Runner: The Scorch Trials	Frypan	
2018	Burden	Kelvin Kennedy	
2018	Maze Runner: The Death Cure	Frypan	
2020	Son of the South	John Lewis	
2020	The Binge	Hags	
2023	Chang Can Dunk	DeAndre	
2024	Half Baked: Totally High	JR	

=== Television ===
List of television appearances and roles
Year	Title	Role	Notes
2008	Minutemen	Chester	Television film
2009	Poor Paul	Bobby the Fish	Episode: "I Know a Guy"
2010	Cougar Town	Glee Club Member #1	Episode: "Breakdown"
2010	Victorious	Nate	Episode: "Survival of the Hottest"
2012	Strawberry Summer	Noah	Television film
2016–22	Hell's Kitchen	Himself	2 episodes
2016	Making Moves	Noah	Web series Main role; 9 episodes
2020	Saved by the Bell	DeVante Young	Main role
2024	Fight Night: The Million Dollar Heist	Muhammad Ali	
