= Sammi Cohen =

American director (born 1988 or 1989)

- Born: 1988 or 1989 (age 37–38)
- Occupation: Director
- Notable work: Crush (2022); You Are So Not Invited to My Bat Mitzvah (2023)

Sammi Cohen (born 1988 or 1989) is an American film and television director. They directed the 2017 comedy series Hollywood Darlings for Pop TV, and the coming-of-age films Crush (2022) and You Are So Not Invited to My Bat Mitzvah (2023).

== Career ==
Before becoming a director, Cohen worked as an editor and visual effects supervisor on commercials and music videos. Cohen's directorial career began when they filmed comedy music videos of their friends at Upright Citizens Brigade, and were then hired to direct original content for CollegeHumor. They were the director of Hollywood Darlings on Pop TV, and they directed series for YouTube Originals and Comedy Central. They have also directed commercials.

In July 2021, it was reported that Cohen would direct Crush (then called Love in Color) for Hulu. A queer romance film set in a high school, the film was Cohen's feature debut. Cohen said they were attracted to the project because it was a queer narrative "where the story isn't about coming out", and they sought to work on the "kind of movie that I really desperately needed growing up". Crush, starring Rowan Blanchard and Auliʻi Cravalho, was released in April 2022 on Hulu.

In 2022, Netflix announced its development of You Are So Not Invited to My Bat Mitzvah, a film adapted from the 2005 Fiona Rosenbloom novel of the same name. Netflix announced that the film would be directed by Cohen and would star Adam Sandler and his daughters. Cohen, who was hired because Sandler was looking for a young Jewish director, was added to the project after the script had been obtained by Alloy Entertainment and Sandler's Happy Madison Productions. Cohen also joined after Sandler's daughters had been cast in leading roles. In August 2023, You Are So Not Invited to My Bat Mitzvah was released on Netflix. In a favorable review, Gary Goldstein of the Los Angeles Times wrote that Cohen brought a "more spontaneous, loose-limbed style" to the film. Discussing their feature films, Cohen said: "With Crush, I made a movie for the gays and for the Little Sammies, and then with Bat Mitzvah, I was so excited to make a movie for Jewish kids."

In January 2026, Variety reported that Cohen would direct Betas, a comedy film written by Ilana Wolpert.

== Personal life ==
Cohen was raised in Woodland Hills, Los Angeles, in a Reform Jewish household. They grew up going to temple and celebrating the High Holy Days. While they attended Hebrew school and had a bat mitzvah party at age 13, they did not do a traditional ceremony. They officially became a bat mitzvah while on their birthright trip in Israel. They describe themself as a "very progressive Jew" and their Jewish community as "very progressive". They go to Shabbat services.

Cohen is queer, non-binary, and uses they/them pronouns. They first came out as nonbinary while performing stand-up comedy. At the 2024 Independent Spirit Awards, Cohen and Zoe Lister-Jones announced their relationship.

== See also ==
- List of transgender film and television directors
