= Holly Slept Over =

2020 film by Joshua Friedlander

- Release poster
- Directed by: Joshua Friedlander
- Written by: Joshua Friedlander
- Produced by: Jeremy Garelick; Mickey Liddell; Pete Shilaimon; Will Phelps; Glen Trotiner; Jason Blumenfeld
- Starring: Josh Lawson; Nathalie Emmanuel; Britt Lower; Erinn Hayes; Ron Livingston
- Cinematography: John W. Rutland
- Edited by: Frank Longo
- Music by: Jason Nesmith
- Production company: American Indie
- Distributed by: Sony Pictures Home Entertainment
- Release date: March 3, 2020
- Running time: 87 minutes
- Country: United States
- Language: English

Holly Slept Over is a 2020 American comedy-drama film written and directed by Joshua Friedlander, in his directorial debut. It stars Josh Lawson, Nathalie Emmanuel, Britt Lower, Erinn Hayes, and Ron Livingston. The film was released on video-on-demand platforms on March 3, 2020, by Sony Pictures Home Entertainment.

== Plot ==
Noel and Audra are a married couple who are both lawyers. They have been trying to get pregnant for a year but fail at their attempts. Pete and Marnie are their neighbours and friends who are also a married couple.

One day Audra receives a message on social media from her old college roommate, Holly, asking for a meeting. Audra tells Noel about Holly and how they had a fling in college as a lesbian experiment. Noel is surprised and tells Pete about it, who suggests that Noel should have a threesome with Audra and Holly. Audra invites Holly to her house for a meetup but is nervous so Noel welcomes her to the house. Holly introduces herself to Noel who is instantly attracted to her. Holly takes a shower and sleeps for the whole day.

In the evening, Audra wakes her up and they have dinner, where Noel admits he knows about their fling. Audra is upset and Noel tries to comfort her. Holly and Noel talk and he proposes the idea of a threesome. Holly agrees and they try to convince Audra, who resists at first but agrees after eating Holly's marijuana cookie. As the trio are making out, Marnie walks into the house enraged at her husband because he masturbated on her face. They have a fight and eventually walk out of the house. Holly, Noel and Audra continue and have sex together. After sex, Audra admits to her husband that she was in love with Holly and they had a fight when Holly started sleeping with other people. Noel is frustrated when he sees both of them kissing each other and tells Holly to sleep in the guest room. Holly agrees and says they will talk in the morning.

In the morning, the couple wakes up to breakfast being made for them by Holly, who is now leaving. Six months later, both couples are still happily married and Audra is heavily pregnant.

== Cast ==
- Josh Lawson as Noel
- Nathalie Emmanuel as Holly
- Britt Lower as Audra
- Erinn Hayes as Marnie
- Ron Livingston as Peter

== Production ==
Filming took place in October 2017 in Syracuse, New York.
