= Warner Bros. Museum =

Public attraction at Warner Bros. Studios, Burbank

- Established: 1996; 30 years ago
- Location: Burbank, California, U.S.
- Coordinates: 34.148632°N 118.338708°W
- Type: Film studio museum
- Owners: Warner Bros. Studio Facilities (Skydance Corporation)

Warner Bros. Museum, also known as the Warner Bros. Studio Tour Archive, is the only studio museum in the film industry of Burbank, California and is dedicated to Warner Bros. Opened in 1996, the 7,000 sq. foot museum brings together costumes, props, animation cells and letters collected from the history of Warner Bros. film-making and television programs.

Steven J. Ross Theater and the museum were built on the former location of a film vault near Brownstone Street that was dismantled in 1995. Numerous items were sourced from Jack M. Warner's estate. The archivist Leith Adams compiled the items for the public to view. The museum can be visited during a "VIP tour" that lasts 75 minutes.

== Collection ==
- Original costumes from Batman - Michael Keaton's Batsuit, Kim Basinger's 'Vicki Vale' outfit and Jack Nicholson's "Joker" costume.
- Original costumes and props from Batman Returns - Michael Keaton's Batsuit, the Penguin costume worn by Danny DeVito etc.
- Original Riddler, Two-Face, Batman and Robin costumes from Batman Forever.
- Original costumes and props from Batman & Robin.
- Original costumes and props from Batman Begins - Christian Bale's Batman costume, the Ra's al Ghul outfit that was worn by Liam Neeson, the Scarecrow costume, along with the iconic bag mask, worn by Cillian Murphy, the costume worn by Ken Watanabe and others.
- Original costumes and props from The Dark Knight - Batman's costume, Joker's nurse costume, several of the henchmen clown masks from the heist scene at the very beginning of the film, a mini replica of the Tumbler, the original Joker suit that was worn by actor Heath Ledger, whose performance of the Joker would win him a posthumous Academy Award for Best Supporting Actor, Batman's pump-action sticky bomb gun, The Joker's signature playing card calling card, Two-Face's coin props, the suit that was worn by Aaron Eckhart, who portrayed Two-Face and even the letter written by 'Rachel Dawes', Bruce Wayne's childhood friend and former flame (in this movie played by Maggie Gyllenhaal), before her death.
- Original props and costumes from The Dark Knight Rises - the outfit worn by Tom Hardy, who portrayed Bane, Bane's bomb, the "Alfred Pennyworth" outfit worn by Michael Caine, the original costumes worn by Gary Oldman, Joseph Gordon-Levitt and Marion Cotillard, who portrayed in the film Commissioner James Gordon, John Blake and Miranda Tate/Talia al Ghul respectively and others.
- Props and costumes from Sweeney Todd, Mars Attacks!, Charlie and the Chocolate Factory and Corpse Bride.
- Props and costumes from the Harry Potter films, including the "Sorting Hat".
- The martial arts pants Bruce Lee wore in Enter the Dragon.
- Oscars and Oscar envelopes for some of Warner's films, including The Life of Emile Zola, Casablanca, My Fair Lady and The Jazz Singer.
- The costume, worn by James Dean in Giant and Dean's personal Triumph 500 motorcycle.
- The piano from Casablanca and Humphrey Bogart's and Ingrid Bergman's clothes.
- Letters from Errol Flynn, John Wayne, Ronald Reagan and Jack Warner.
- The extravagant hats from the Ascot Race scene in My Fair Lady and the pumpkinseed gown, worn by Vanessa Redgrave as Queen Guenevere in Camelot.
- The real Maltese Falcon (the original black bird statuette).
- Dresses that were worn by Joan Crawford.
- Audrey Hepburn's hat.
- John Wayne's saddle and chaps.
- John Wayne's costume from The Sea Chase, his uniform from Operation Pacific and one of the rifles he used in Cahill U.S. Marshal.
- Clint Eastwood's iconic outfits from Dirty Harry, Gran Torino and Heartbreak Ridge.
- Faye Dunaway's outfit from Bonnie and Clyde.
- Life masks of Elizabeth Taylor and Richard Burton.
- Props and costumes from The Hangover.
- The costumes from 300.
- The End Credits build display from The Lego Movie.
- The whole Central Perk set from Friends.

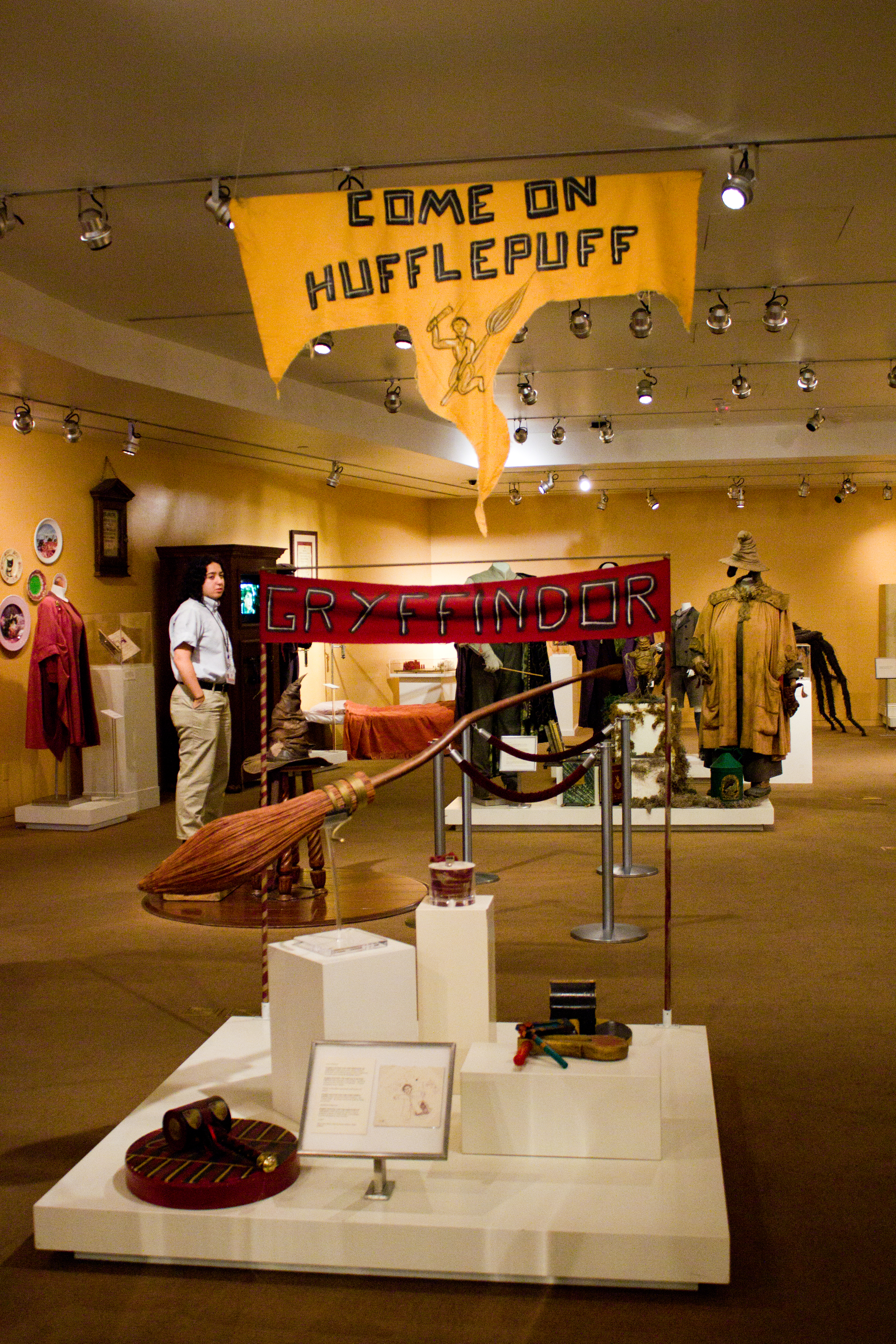
A Harry Potter exhibit at Warner Bros. Museum
