= Jeremy Garelick =

American film director and screenwriter

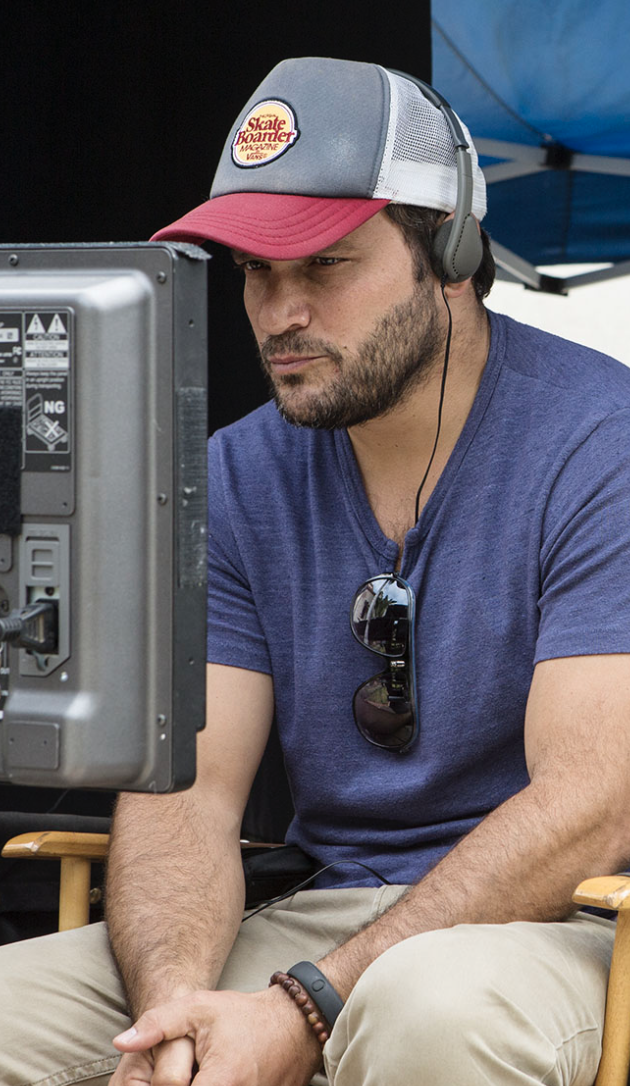
- Garelick in 2022
- Born: November 30, 1975 (age 50); New York City, U.S.
- Education: Yale University
- Occupations: Screenwriter, film director, producer
- Years active: 2000–present

Jeremy Garelick (born November 30, 1975) is an American filmmaker.

== Early life ==
Garelick was born in New York City. He attended Yale University and graduated in Film Studies. He is of Jewish background.

== Career ==
After graduating from college, Garelick began his career working as an assistant in Creative Artists Agency's Motion Picture Literary department. He served as the assistant to director Joel Schumacher on Tigerland, Bad Company, Phone Booth, and The Phantom of the Opera. He was the second unit director on Schumacher’s 2003 movie Veronica Guerin.

While working on Veronica Guerin in 2002, Garelick sold The Golden Tux, a spec script he co-wrote with Todd Phillips, to Dimension Films. The script caught the attention of Vince Vaughn, who brought Garelick in to co-write and co-produce The Break-Up.

After the commercial success of The Break-Up, Garelick worked with Phillips again on an uncredited re-write of The Hangover. The film was a major critical and commercial success, making over $465 million at the box office.

Garelick’s early career came full circle in 2013, when he was hired by Screen Gems to direct and produce The Wedding Ringer, a feature film that evolved from The Golden Tux. Despite negative critical reviews, the film was a box-office success when it premiered in 2015, grossing over $79 million worldwide.

In 2018, Garelick co-created, directed, wrote, and produced Best. Worst. Weekend. Ever., an eight-episode Netflix limited series.

In 2023, Garelick directed Murder Mystery 2, a Netflix movie starring Adam Sandler and Jennifer Aniston.

Garelick directed the 2026 comedy film, Rolling Loud, starring Owen Wilson, Matt Rife, Henry Winkler, and Travis Scott.

=== American High ===
In 2017, along with producing partner Will Phelps, Garelick purchased A.V. Zogg School in Liverpool, New York for $1 million, with the intention of using it as a location to produce three high school-centered feature films at a fraction of what they would normally cost to produce. By using the same location, Garelick believed he could save millions thanks to the high tax incentives offered to shoot in Central New York, coupled with savings in below-the-line production costs. Under the banner of "American High," Garelick produced two movies: Banana Split for $1.2 million and Holly Slept Over for $500,000.

American High's third film, Big Time Adolescence, a coming-of-age comedy film starring Pete Davidson and Griffin Gluck, was a critical success. After it was screened at the 2019 Sundance Film Festival, the film's rights were sold to Hulu. The streaming service and American High subsequently signed an eight-movie licensing deal.

Garelick subsequently produced the American High films Looks That Kill, The Ultimate Playlist of Noise, and Plan B. In August 2020, Garelick made his American High directorial debut with The Binge, a spoof of The Purge set in a world in which drugs and alcohol are illegal, except for one day. A sequel to the film is set to begin production in January 2022. Four additional American High movies are currently in post-production.

In 2020, Garelick was named one of The Hollywood Reporter's Top Innovators in 2020 for his role in creating American High. In order to have the area around the A.V. Zogg School zoned for filming by the city of Liverpool, American High also offered a trade school, in addition to its use as a film studio. Each American High production employs about ten students from local colleges like Syracuse University, Ithaca College, and Le Moyne College.

In August 2020, Garelick said that American High would relocate, citing high expenditures and code-compliance "confusion." However, as of 2026, American High is still in operation at A.V. Zogg School.

== Filmography ==
=== Film ===
Short film

| Year | Title | Director | Writer | Producer |
|---|---|---|---|---|
| 2002 | Is This Your Mother? | Yes | Yes | Yes |

Feature film

| Year | Title | Director | Producer | Writer |
|---|---|---|---|---|
| 2006 | The Break-Up | No | Co-producer | Yes |
| 2009 | The Hangover | No | No | Rewrites |
| 2015 | The Wedding Ringer | Yes | Executive | Yes |
| 2018 | Family | No | Yes | No |
| 2018 | Banana Split | No | Yes | No |
| 2019 | Big Time Adolescence | No | Yes | No |
| 2020 | Holly Slept Over | No | Yes | No |
| 2020 | Looks That Kill | No | Yes | No |
| 2020 | The Binge | Yes | Yes | No |
| 2021 | The Ultimate Playlist of Noise | No | Yes | No |
| 2021 | Plan B | No | Yes | No |
| 2023 | Murder Mystery 2 | Yes | No | No |
| 2025 | Summer of 69 | No | Yes | No |
| 2026 | Pizza Movie | No | Yes | No |
| 2026 | Rolling Loud | Yes | Yes | Yes |

Acting role

| Year | Title | Role |
|---|---|---|
| 2014 | Dumb and Dumber To | KEN Conference Attendee |

=== Television ===
| Year | Title | Director | Writer | Producer | Notes |
|---|---|---|---|---|---|
| 2014 | The Rebels | No | Yes | Executive | Episode "Pilot" |
| 2015 | Life in Pieces | Yes | No | No | Episode "Sleepy Email Brunch Tree" |
| 2015 | DeTour | Yes | No | No | Television film |
| 2016 | The Grinder | Yes | No | No | Episode: "Exodus (Pt. 1)" |
| 2016 | Cooper Barrett's Guide to Surviving Life | Yes | No | No | Episode: "How to Survive Your Crazy Ex" |
| 2018 | Best. Worst. Weekend. Ever. | Yes | Yes | Yes | |
