= Brazen head =

Legendary automaton in the early modern period

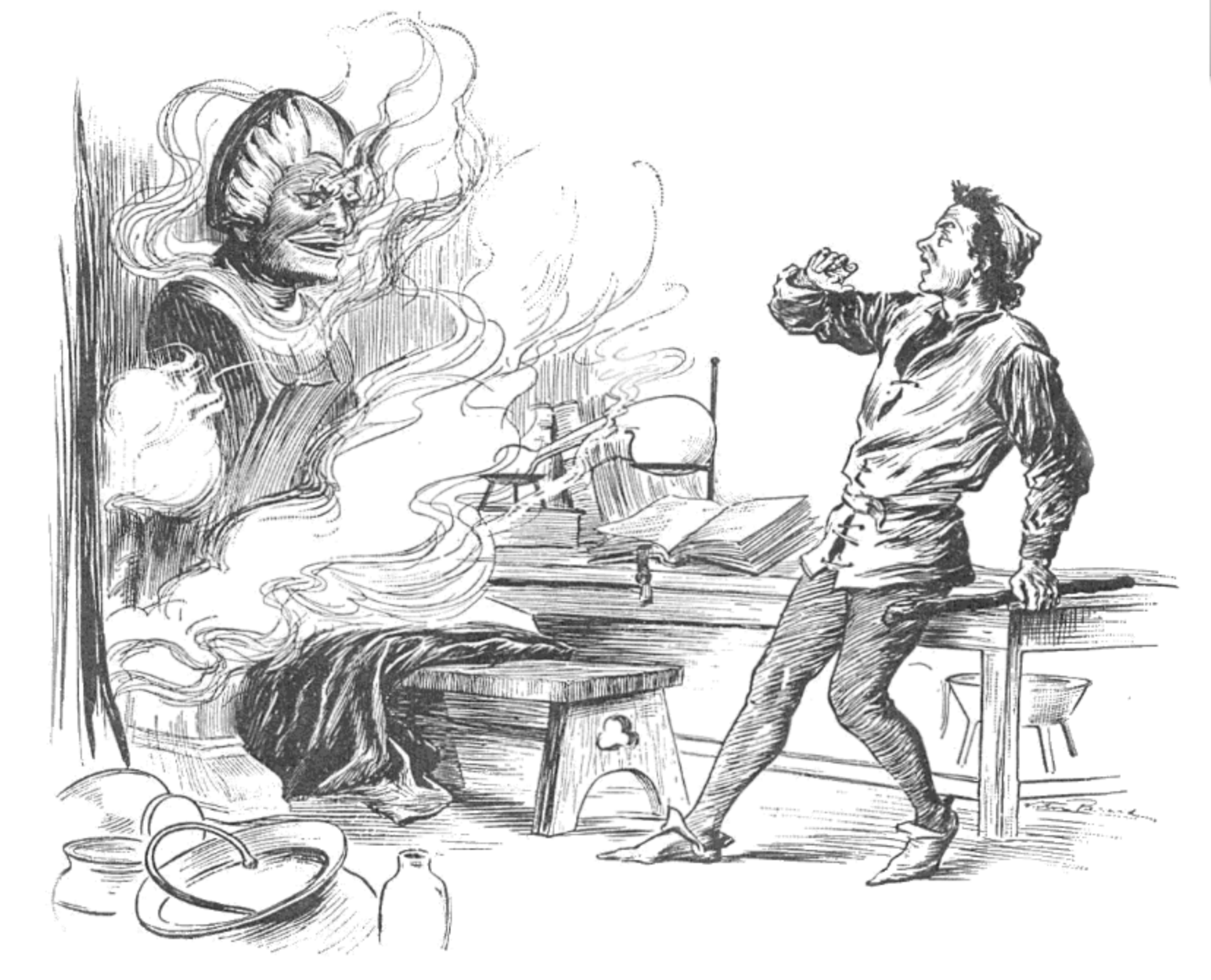
Roger Bacon's assistant Miles is confronted by the Brazen Head in a 1905 retelling of the story.

A brazen head, brass, or bronze head was a legendary automaton in the Middle Ages to the early modern period whose ownership was ascribed to late medieval scholars, such as Roger Bacon, who had developed a reputation as wizards. Made of brass or bronze, the male head was variously mechanical or magical. Like Odin's head of Mimir in Norse paganism, (Note: Other speaking severed heads include the Celtic Bran the Blessed and the Greek Orpheus.) it was reputed to be able to correctly answer any question put to it, although it was sometimes restricted to "yes" or "no" answers. In the seventeenth century, Thomas Browne considered them to be misunderstanding of the scholars' alchemical work, while in modern times, Borlik argues that they came to serve as "a metonymy for the hubris of Renaissance intellectuals and artists". Idries Shah devotes a chapter of his book The Sufis to providing an interpretation of this "head of wisdom" as well as the phrase making a head, stating that at its source the head "is none other than the symbol of the [Sufic] completed man."

== Legend ==
Chaucer's "The Squire's Tale" depicts a moving brazen horse among the gifts from an Arab and an Indian king to Cambuscan, and compares it to the Trojan horse. It is likely that these accounts had their origin in allegorical treatments of alchemy and in early machines whose owners pretended to have given them life or speech. They may also have found inspiration in the Greek legends concerning Talos, the brass guardian of Minoan Crete.

The first account of a talking head used to give its owner answers to his questions appears in William of Malmesbury's c. 1125 History of the English Kings, in a passage where he collects various rumors surrounding the polymath Pope Sylvester II, who was said to have traveled to al-Andalus and stolen a tome of secret knowledge, whose owner he was only able to escape through demonic assistance. (Note: Malmesbury even notes that "probably some may regard all this as a fiction, because the vulgar are used to undermine the fame of scholars, saying that the man who excels in any admirable science, holds converse with the devil" but professes himself willing to believe the stories about Sylvester because of the (spurious) accounts he had of the pope's "shameful end". In fact, Sylvester's reputation as a sorcerer arose from the slanderous "Against Gregory VII and Urban II" (Latin: Contra Gregorium VII et Urbanum II), written c. 1085 by an imperial partisan—either St Benno of Osnabrück or Cardinal Benno of San Martino—anxious to discredit the independent papacy amid the Investiture Controversy.) He was said to have cast the head of a statue using his knowledge of astrology. It would not speak until spoken to, but then answered any yes/no question put to it.

The Roman poet Virgil, in his medieval role as a sorcerer, was credited with creating his own oracular head in Gautier de Metz's c. 1245 Image of the World (French: Image du Monde). The 1319 Reynard the Fox (Renard le Contrefait) retold the story and may have been the first to specify that the head was made of brass.

The heads were then ascribed to several of the major figures of the 12th- and 13th-century Renaissance, who introduced Europe to Arabian editions of Aristotelian logic and science, as well as the Muslims' own work on mathematics, optics, and astronomy. These included Robert Grosseteste, Albertus Magnus, and—most famously—Roger Bacon. Grosseteste was said to have constructed "an hed of bras to... make it for to telle of suche thinges as befelle" over the course of seven years but then lost it through 30 seconds' neglect. Its relics were supposedly held in a vault under Lincoln College. Reports that Albertus Magnus had a head with a human voice and breath and "a certain reasoning process" bestowed by a cacodemon eventually gave way to stories that he had built an entire automaton who was so overly talkative that his student Thomas Aquinas destroyed it for continually interrupting his train of thought. Bacon, with the help of a Friar Bungy or Bungay, was said to have spent seven years building one of the devices in order to discover whether it would be possible to render Britain impregnable by ringing it with a wall of brass. (Note: A project to construct a brass wall around Carmarthen had earlier been attributed to Merlin by the Welsh bards, a story which reappeared in Spenser.) They only succeeded in their work once they compelled the assistance of a demon. Like Grosseteste before them, however, they were said to have missed the decisive moment, either from forgetfulness or exhaustion. Having missed it, the head either collapsed or exploded or was scrapped as useless.

Other people reputed to have a brazen head include Boethius, Faust, Arnaldus de Villa Nova, Stephen of Tours, and Enrique de Villena. A brazen head also appears in the surviving accounts of the Carolingian Valentine and Nameless, where it reveals the pair's royal origin in a necromancer's lair in Clarimond Castle; despite the age of the base story, however, the earliest surviving copies date to the 15th century. It is thought to have been the basis for a lost Elizabethan drama.

== History ==
Hero of Alexandria wrote two books, the Pneumatica and Automata, about devices powered by steam, water, or air. These books were known to medieval Islamic science, and reappeared in Europe during the 12th- and 13th-century Renaissance.

The talking "Skull of Balsamo" was a mechanical illusion of the Viennese magician Joseffy. The skull was made of painted copper inset with real human teeth, answering questions by turning or clicking its lower jaw.

== In popular culture ==
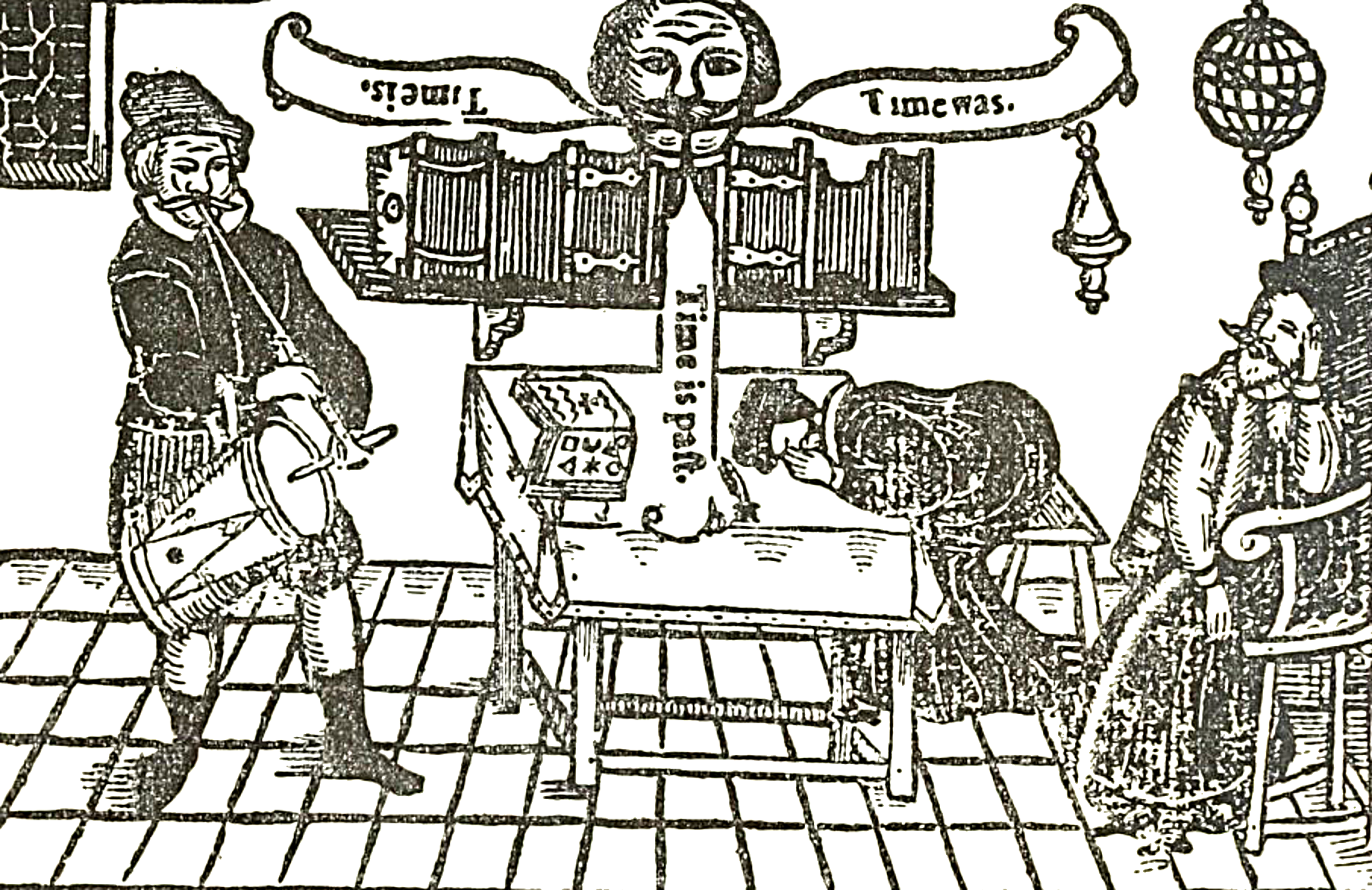
An Elizabethan woodcut of Miles playing his tambour while Friars Bacon and Bungay sleep and their Brazen Head speaks: "Time is. Time was. Time is past."

=== Literature ===
- Robert Greene's c. 1590 treatment of Bacon's brazen head, the play Friar Bacon and Friar Bungay, was one of the most successful Elizabethan comedies.
- Miguel de Cervantes's 1605 Don Quixote lampoons the idea with Don Antonio Moreno's brazen head, created for him by a Polish pupil of "Escotillo"; it is later revealed to be fake.
- Daniel Defoe's 1722 Journal of the Plague Year, set in London's 1665 plague, states that Bacon's brazen head was the usual sign over the establishments of fortune tellers.
- Lord Byron references Bacon's brazen head in Don Juan Canto I, stanza CCXVII (1818).
- Nathaniel Hawthorne referenced both Bacon's brazen head and Albertus Magnus's man of brass in his 1843 "The Birth-Mark" and 1844 "The Artist of the Beautiful".
- William Douglas O'Connor's 1891 "The Brazen Android" features Bacon attempting to use a steam-powered brazen head to terrify King Henry into meeting Simon de Montfort's demands for greater democracy, although he repents after his prototype explodes.
- James Baldwin's 1905 Thirty More Famous Stories Retold reset the story of "Friar Bacon and the Brazen Head" as a children's story.
- John Masefield's 1935 The Box of Delights includes a bronze head among its characters.
- In C.S. Lewis's 1945 novel That Hideous Strength, the preserved head of a guillotined murderer is used by the villains as a medium of communication with demons.
- John Cowper Powys's 1956 The Brazen Head centres around Bacon and his eponymous head.
- Philip K. Dick's 1967 The Zap Gun has a guidance system which is plowshared into "Ol' Orville", a featureless telepathic head sold as a novelty to the people of West-Bloc but which the protagonist consults for serious ontological and practical questions.
- John Bellairs's 1969 The Face in the Frost, set in a fantasy 13th century, includes a magic-wielding Bacon whose (rather deaf) brazen head is used to fend off marauding Danes.
- Avram Davidson's 1969 The Phoenix and the Mirror, set in a fantasy version of the Roman Empire, includes a talking head which gives its name to Vergil Magus's home, the House of the Brazen Head. It guards the house, welcomes visitors, and announces them to Vergil.
- Robertson Davies's 1970 Fifth Business includes a brazen head used as part of a magic act.
- William Gibson's 1984 Neuromancer, set in the near-future "Sprawl", depicts a computer terminal, which is used to permit two artificial intelligences to merge into a superconciousness, as a gem-encrusted platinum head voiced by "a beautiful arrangement of gears and miniature organ pipes ... a perverse thing, because synth-voice chips cost next to nothing ..."
- Norman Rush's 1991 Mating, set in Botswana in 1980, features a character who nicknames US president Ronald Reagan "The Brazen Head" through a garbled comparison with "Babylonian" idols supposedly "equipped with speaking tubes leading down into the bowels of the temple whence the priests would make the idol speak".
- Tom Deitz's Soulsmith trilogy (1991–1993) features a protagonist who constructs a brazen head as his masterwork.
- Gregory Frost's Shadowbridge novels (2008 and seq.) includes a lion-faced brass pendant which advises the protagonist.
- Matthew J. Kirby's 2010 The Clockwork Three, set in the 19th century, includes a clockwork head, attributed to Albertus Magnus, that constantly repeats "Cur?" (Latin for 'Why?') until it is activated; afterwards, it speaks normally, but fails to understand any statement with the word why in it.
- A brazen head plays a significant role in Mary Gentle's novel Ash: A Secret History.

=== Television ===
- In Da Vinci's Demons, Leonardo discovers a brazen head in the Andes which functions as an ornate phonograph.

=== Video games ===
- In The Savage Empire, the first Worlds of Ultima game, a brass head can be found and eventually reunited with its bejeweled body, creating a golem-like automaton that joins the player's party.
- A metal head, referred to as "the Hidden Knowledge", appears in Atlantis: The Lost Tales, described as being able to answer all questions. This head, however, appears to be made of steel or silver, rather than brass.

=== Role playing games ===
- The Sample Dungeon written by J. Eric Holmes for the 1977 Dungeons & Dragons Basic Set rulebook contains a room in which "set into the stone of the west wall is a bronze mask, about the size of a manhole cover. The eyes and mouth are shut". A riddle is inscribed, which if solved will cause the mask to open its eyes and speak, answering one question per day.
- The scenario The Auction for the Call of Cthulhu role playing game centers around the theft and recovery of a brazen head that is reputed to give answers to any question related to the Mythos.

== Namesakes ==
The Brazen Head pub in Dublin, established in 1198 and over 800 years old, is the second oldest pub in Ireland. There is also a Brazen Head pub in Limerick.

Additionally, there are bars named The Brazen Head in Brooklyn, New York; in Toronto, Ontario, Canada; and pubs in Omaha, Nebraska; in Marylebone in London; in Glasgow; in Bloemfontein, South Africa; and in Napier, New Zealand. There is a Brazen Head Inn in Mingo in West Virginia and San Francisco.

== See also ==
- List of fictional robots and androids
- Magic mirror
- Talos
- Teraphim
- Wizard of Oz (character)
- Zoltar (fortune-teller robot)
