= A Mutiny in Time =

Book by James Dashner

- First edition (publ. Scholastic Inc)
- Author: James Dashner
- Publisher: Scholastic Corporation
- Publication date: August 1, 2012
- Pages: 192
- ISBN: 978-0-545-38696-8
- Followed by: Divide and Conquer

A Mutiny in Time is the first book in the Infinity Ring series by James Dashner, published August 28, 2012. The series follows Riq, Dak, and Sera as they time-travel throughout history in order to fix history. The first book introduces the trio and follows them as they try to prevent a revolt by the Amancio brothers. The book is followed by Divide and Conquer, in which the trio go to the year 885 in order to protect Paris from thousands of Viking warriors.

== Main characters and organizations ==
- Dak Smyth- an eleven-year-old boy that is the best friend of Sera and extremely devoted to history.
- Sera Froste- an eleven-year-old girl that is best friends with Dak and extremely knowledgeable in science.
- SQ- the organization that intimidates the governments of the world and that causes trouble, according to Sera.
- Riq- the sixteen-year old Hystorian who is serious and a prodigy of languages.
- Hystorians- a group established by Aristotle that is devoted to fixing history.
- Amancio brothers- cruel SQ members who betrayed their friends to overthrow Columbus.
- Gloria- a butcher that is amazed by the future and who is a Hystorian that helps the kids.
- Eyeball- a ruthless and filthy man who loves Gloria and actually helps the kids stop the mutiny.
- Mari and Brint- the leaders of the Hystorians.
- The Smyths- Dak's mom and dad

== Plot ==
=== Prologue-Chapter 20 (Pages 1-112) ===
The book begins with the main characters- Dak Smyth and Sera Froste. They are sitting on a tree on a Saturday afternoon, thinking about the troubles of the world. Meanwhile, Brint Takashi and Mari Rivera, his second-in-command are Hystorians, a group committed to putting history back on the right track. However, they know that the world is about to end, as suggested by disasters all around the world. The end of the world is known as the Cataclysm. However, they are tracking Dak's parents and their progress. Dak and Sera are both nerds, with Dak interested in history and Sera interested in science. The day after an awkward funeral at Dak's Great-Uncle Frankie, Dak, Sera, and their class goes to the Smithsonian Museum. As Dak soaks in everything, Sera is bored with the history. Suddenly, an earthquake rocks the building, nearly causing a Viking long ship to fall on Dak and Sera. After the disaster, Sera experiences a Remnant, a feeling that some things should've been. When she goes to Dak to share it, he allows her to enter his parents' lab. Soon, Sera has completed a device called the Infinity Ring that allows time-travel. When Dak's parents return, they also learn about the completed device, and soon, they travel back in time using the device. However, when they return, Dak and Sera find that Dak's parents are gone.

Soon, a dozen SQ members storm the lab of Dak's parents, although the pair finds out that it actually isn't the SQ. They were captured by the Hystorians, an organizations established by Aristotle in 336 B.C. in order to save the world from the Cataclysm and put history on the right track. And now, Sera and the Smyth's have given them time-travel and allowed them to fix the great Breaks, or times in history that turned out wrong. When Brint and Mari introduce them to the Hystorians, only Riq stands out. He was far younger than every one else, with dark skin and eyes. He also knows sixteen languages and is sixteen years old. Soon, the SQ storms the compound, and Sera, Riq, and Dak quickly use the Infinity Ring to escape. They reach the Great Pyramid of Giza thousands of years ago, and they discuss their next move. This is the first Break:

"Sally forth, astute and wise/Search the page, find the prize/ Centuries pass, mind and heart/ Devoted to the Memory's Art." After Riq solves the Art of Memory, they go to Palos de la Frontera on August 3, 1492. However, they meet a Time Warden of the SQ, and have to escape.

=== Chapter 21-Chapter 36 (Pages 113-190) ===
After escaping from the Time Warden, they find their Hystorian, a butcher named Gloria. They discuss the Break that they have to fix, and learns that Queen Isabella has commissioned a major voyage. The group believes that they must help the Amancio brothers- Salvador and Raul- complete a mutiny against the cruel captain Christopher Columbus. Gloria helps them get on the boat that the mutiny is about to happen on, through the help of a one-eyed man named Eyeball. The kids have to work extremely hard while on the ship, the Santa Maria. Although they still believe that the mutiny must happen soon, they soon discover that Raul and Salvador are SQ. The kids meets "riffraff", or the lowest of the low, including Ricardo, Francisco, and Daniel. However, Eyeball hears them discuss the mutiny and puts them in the brig. They are to be killed next morning. However, Eyeball is actually on their side, due to his love for Gloria. The riffraff expose the Amancio brothers and battle them to prevent the mutiny. However, Raul throws Dak overboard. He soon learns that Salvador is dead and Raul was thrown overboard, too. However, Raul tries to drown Dak, and Sera uses the Infinity Ring to warp herself, Dak, and Riq to another place, a warehouse. However, they find a wanted poster for Dak's parents. Meanwhile, Brint and Mari reflect on the SQ attack, and Brint wonders if his high school was always named after Columbus.

== Indications of an alternate history ==
- 48 stars on the United States flag.
- Volcanic eruptions along the Pacific Rim, Blizzards in parts of South America where it never occurred, Tropical storms in the Atlantic, Fires in the Northeast.
- Remnants: the feeling that something should have existed or happened that did not.
- Philadelphia is the capital of the United States.
- President McClellan's face being on Mount Rushmore.
- An organization called the SQ intimidating the governments of the world.
- The Amancio brothers carrying out a mutiny and killing Christopher Columbus.
- The Roman Empire rising again after falling.
