= The Death Cure =

2011 novel by James Dashner

- First edition cover of The Death Cure
- Author: James Dashner
- Cover artist: Philip Straub
- Language: English
- Series: The Maze Runner series
- Genre: Young adult, dystopia, science fiction
- Published: 11 October, 2011
- Publisher: Delacorte Press
- Publication place: United States
- Media type: Print (hardcover and paperback), audiobook, e-book
- Pages: 325
- ISBN: 978-0-385-73877-4
- OCLC: 698332724
- Preceded by: The Scorch Trials
- Followed by: The Kill Order (in publication order)

The Death Cure is a 2011 young adult dystopian science fiction novel written by American writer James Dashner and the third published in The Maze Runner series (the fifth and last in narrative order). It was published on 11 October 2011 by Delacorte Press and was preceded in publication order by The Maze Runner and The Scorch Trials and followed by the series prequels, The Kill Order and The Fever Code.

== Plot ==
After being kept in solitary confinement, Thomas is eventually released by Janson (nicknamed the "Rat Man"), who is the assistant director of WICKED (World In Catastrophe: Killzone Experiment Department). Janson tells the Gladers (Group A) and Group B that most of their number are immune to the Flare, but some, whose names he reads, are not immune, including Newt. The Gladers are offered the chance to remove the mind-control chips in their heads and restore their memories but at the cost of Thomas's ability to communicate telepathically with Teresa and Aris. Only Thomas, Minho, and Newt choose not to undergo the surgery, as they do not trust WICKED, and Thomas does not want to know who he was when he helped to create the maze. All three of them escape from WICKED with the help of Brenda and Jorge before their chips are removed.

Brenda and Jorge are revealed to be working for WICKED. Thomas initially feels betrayed, but Brenda reveals she only joined so that she wouldn't be executed and reasons Teresa may have only betrayed him because of that too. Soon afterward, the Gladers discover that everyone who had undergone the memory restoration abandoned them. Newt gives Thomas a note and tells him to open it "when the time is right." The five then travel to Denver to find Hans, a former WICKED researcher who can remove their mind-control chips. There, a man in a black suit directs them to an address, where Gally, who survived the events of the first book, is waiting for them. Gally has joined the rebel group the Right Arm and explains that WICKED is capturing every Immune that it can find to prepare another cycle of the Trials. He also reveals that in the decaying cities, many live who suffer from the Flare but take the illicit drug Bliss, which slows down the brain's functioning and helps to relieve the pain that Cranks feel from the Flare.

The group finds Hans, who removes Minho's control chip. However, WICKED uses Thomas's chip to force him to resist the procedure. Brenda, Jorge, and Minho must hold him down so that Hans can perform the surgery. Afterward, the group visits a café, where a security guard apprehends Thomas to sell him to bounty hunters, who will take him to WICKED. Janson intervenes in a holographic, sends a police vehicle to rescue Thomas, and tells him that he must return to WICKED "to save Newt." Thomas and his friends find out in a note that Newt has been taken to the Cranks. Minho convinces them to go to the Denver Crank Palace to rescue Newt, where they bribe the guards to get in. When they meet Newt, he angrily orders them to leave, and the other Cranks chase them out. Thomas then remembers Newt's note, reads it, and discovers that he had begged Thomas to kill him. Thomas despairs over not having read the note earlier.

After returning to Denver, Thomas sees that Newt has succumbed to the Flare. Thomas answers Newt's pleas by shooting him in the head as an act of mercy. The group then discovers that Teresa and the other Immunes have been captured. After knocking out the guards, they discover that the guards were led by Vince, the leader of the Right Arm, who explains that they are infiltrating WICKED's headquarters. Inside, Thomas discovers how Janson tried to use his attempt "to save Newt" to compile data for the cure by examining the physical structure of Thomas's brain, which would kill him. Thomas is forced to begin the deadly brain surgery but manages to plant a device that disables WICKED's weapons, which allows the Right Arm to begin storming the facility.

Thomas wakes up to find a note from Chancellor Ava Paige, the head of WICKED, who explains there are already enough resources from the Trials to make a blueprint for the cure and so his brain is not needed after all. Paige reveals the location of the Immunes "sold" by the Right Arm to gain access to WICKED, and she gives directions to a "safe place" where Thomas should take all of them. Thomas and his friends re-enter the Maze and find the captured Immunes. However, they learn the Right Arm intends to destroy, rather than occupy, the WICKED headquarters. Explosions rock the Maze, and falling debris kills some of the Immunes who are inside. Triggered by the commotion, the Grievers come out of storage, but Teresa shows Thomas how to shut them down. Thomas finds a back-door; which turns out to be a Flat Trans. They start herding the Immune kids through the Flat Trans but before Thomas and his friends can escape, Janson and the security guards corner them. They start a fight which ends when Thomas strangles Janson to death. However, Teresa, in a final attempt to prove to Thomas she loved him all along, also dies from falling debris to save his life. Fleeing the building, the Immunes escape through the Flat Trans that leads to a lush paradise. Minho becomes the technical leader, Brenda and Thomas start a relationship (although Thomas is still grieving for his losses, particularly Teresa) and the Immunes resolve to wait until everyone is dead so they can return to the old world.

The epilogue is narrated by Paige. She reveals that after the catastrophic solar flares, the Flare was deliberately created and released by the government as a form of population control. However, the government and WICKED found themselves unable to control the plague. Paige came to realize that they would never be able to find a cure for the Flare and that WICKED's efforts were futile. She realized that the only hope of preventing humanity's extinction was for Immunes to start their society, away from the rest of the world. She devised a plan with Brenda and Jorge to send them to a safe place where they could restore human civilization and so she stated, "WICKED is good."

== Characters ==
- Thomas (Named after Thomas Edison): The main protagonist of the series. He is a teenage boy who was a Runner of Group A (the Gladers) before escaping the Maze with his fellow Gladers in The Maze Runner. He continued this by crossing the Scorch in The Scorch Trials, in which he was continuously manipulated by almost everyone, making it hard for him to trust other people again. Thomas escapes from having his memories restored in WICKED's headquarters and becomes entangled in the conflict between WICKED and the Right Arm – a rebel organization that opposes it. During the events in The Death Cure he loses several of his beloved ones, particularly Newt, one of his best friends, and Teresa, the girl he was in love with but could never truly forgive for her betrayal in The Scorch Trials despite it being orchestrated by WICKED.
- Teresa (Named after Mother Teresa): A friend of Thomas. The only female Glader of Group A. In The Scorch Trials she betrays Thomas on WICKED's orders, causing him to distrust her. She volunteers for her memories to be restored and moves with the other Gladers to Denver. She eventually turns against WICKED. She dies after saving Thomas from being crushed by falling debris in a final attempt to prove him she loved him all along.
- Newt (Named after Isaac Newton): Newt goes through the most out of all the other characters. He took upon the role of the leader of Group A after their previous leader, Alby, died in The Maze Runner. He is Thomas' closest companion, alongside Minho. The book reveals that Newt is not immune to the Flare virus and is slowly succumbing to its influence. Eventually, he begs his best friend, Thomas, to save him from the virus inside him via euthanasia, which Thomas does.
- Minho: A Glader, and the former Keeper of the Runners of Group A. He was Thomas' fellow Runner back in the Glade and throughout the series becomes one of Thomas' best friends throughout their Trials, joining him to escape WICKED's attempt to restore their memories and save the Immunes from the Maze.
- Brenda: A Canadian girl, was part of a group of rebels in The Scorch Trials before being separated and having to navigate her way through the Scorch. She shares a mutual attraction with Thomas.
- Jorge: The leader of a group of rebels the Gladers met in The Scorch Trials. He has a close relationship with Brenda. Brenda described their relationship as Jorge being "like an uncle" to her. He was revealed to be working for WICKED but helps Thomas, Minho, and Newt escape from WICKED's headquarters and remove their chips.
- Aris (Named after Aristotle): The only male member of Group B. He met Thomas in The Scorch Trials. Aris, Thomas, and Teresa are close friends in The Scorch Trials.
- Janson (Rat Man): The Assistant Director of WICKED and the book's main antagonist. He is succumbing to the Flare virus, which explains his desperation for a cure. He arranges for the Group A and Group B survivors' memories to be restored, but wants to make them go through the Trials again. Eventually, Thomas kills him by strangling him, after Janson and other WICKED members try to recapture the surviving Immunes.
- Gally (Named after Galileo): A Glader of Group A who strictly followed the rules of the Glade and thus became Thomas' adversary in The Maze Runner. He indirectly caused Chuck's death when Chuck intercepted a knife Gally had thrown at Thomas. In this book, he reunites with Thomas and reveals he has been working with the Right Arm, an organization determined to stop WICKED. However, after discovering the Right Arm's true purpose, he left with Thomas and the Gladers to rescue the Immunes in the Maze.
- Vince: The leader of the Right Arm, an organization opposed to WICKED. He is Gally's boss. He recruits Thomas to infiltrate the WICKED headquarters and plant a device inside that disables the WICKED's weapons, and then leads the Right Arm's invasion of WICKED. He is strictly dedicated to his cause and brands Thomas and Gally traitors when they attempt to save hundreds of Immunes hidden in the Maze, which is about to be destroyed by the Right Arm.
- Lawrence: Vince's assistant, who captures Thomas, Minho, Brenda, and Jorge and delivers them to a safe house. After their demands to see "the boss" Lawrence took them to Vince. He later drops off Thomas near the WICKED headquarters for his plan to plant the explosive device.
- Hans: A former WICKED scientist whom Thomas, Minho, Brenda, and Jorge, meet in Denver to help remove the chips from Thomas and Minho.
- Ava Paige: The Chancellor of WICKED and the person responsible for managing and organizing the search for a cure of the Flare, including sending teenagers into the Maze to study the minds of Immunes. However, she disagreed with the consequence that the teenagers were being killed. Her character serves as the omniscient voice in the books' Epilogues. She was never seen in the series, but every Epilogue of the three books in the main series, plus The Fever Code, includes an email she writes to her associates. She states a cure for the Flare virus will never be found, that the Immunes are humanity's last hope to restore the dying world, and that WICKED's actions of sending them for Trials are threatening that hope. She serves as an ex-machina in the narrative, saving Thomas from a fatal brain experiment at the last minute after he was sedated; She instigates and secretly orchestrates his rescue of hundreds of Immunes from the attack on the Maze. She also promises and delivers a paradisaical safe haven for the Immunes.

== Reception ==
Critical reception for The Death Cure was mixed. Common Sense Media gave the book three out of five stars, commenting that the book's oppressiveness kept it from being as memorable as it could have been; they also criticized the characterization of the scientists in the book, describing them as "nonsensically blood-thirsty." The Deseret News also commented on the book's bleak nature, but praised it as being "both conclusive and satisfying". The Horn Book Guide and Kirkus Reviews both gave positive reviews, with the Horn Book Guide opining that the book's conclusion was "thought-provoking".

== Film adaptation ==
Wes Ball, who directed the previous films in the series, confirmed that, if he returned to direct, the final novel would not be split into two films. In March 2015, T. S. Nowlin was confirmed to write the script. On 9 July 2015 Defy Media revealed that filming was set to begin in February 2016. On 16 September 2015 Variety confirmed that Ball would return to direct the third film. The film began principal photography on 14 March 2016 in Cache Creek, British Columbia. On 19 March 2016, Maze Runner star Dylan O'Brien was critically injured on-set when he was struck by a car during a stunt sequence. On 20 March 2016, director Wes Ball announced production was shut down to allow O'Brien time to recuperate from his injuries. On 22 April 2017, the studio again delayed the release in order to allow more time for post-production. Maze Runner: The Death Cure was released on January 26, 2018.
