= The Eye of Minds =

2013 novel by James Dashner

- First edition
- Author: James Smith Dashner
- Cover artist: Kekai Kotaki
- Language: American English
- Series: The Mortality Doctrine
- Genre: Young adult, science fiction
- Publisher: Delacorte Press
- Publication place: United States
- Media type: Print (hardcover and paperback), ebook
- Pages: 312
- ISBN: 978-0-385-74139-2

The Eye of Minds is a 2013 young adult science fiction novel written by American author James Dashner, and the first book in The Mortality Doctrine series. The book was first published on October 8, 2013 by Delacorte Press and is set in a futuristic world where a young gamer must help stop a rogue hacker named Kaine intent on causing mass destruction.

Of the novel, Dashner has stated that he did not view it as a "dystopian or post-apocalyptic tale" akin to his Maze Runner series, but he did view it as having "similarities in tone and feel and spirit to The Maze Runner".

== Plot ==
In the future, humankind has developed a new interpretation of gaming in the form of a virtual reality system known as the VirtNet, which contains various games, including "Lifeblood", a recreation of real life. Michael and his two friends Bryson and Sarah are three talented hackers who can use the game code to manipulate items, and they are employed by VirtNet Security (VNS) to track down a cyberterrorist known as Kaine, who has been trapping people inside the VirtNet. The gamers who are trapped often commit suicide in real life by coding out their Cores, the virtual objects that differentiate between their Auras, or their virtual bodies, and their real-life bodies. The VNS wants Michael and his friends to find out about the Mortality Doctrine, a program created by Kaine. Using information from Cutter, a barber in the game Lifeblood, Michael and his friends hack their way into the high-end Black and Blue club. They meet Ronika, the owner, who tells them that to get to Kaine's base in the Hallowed Ravine, they must get through The Path, which can be accessed through a weak spot in the code within the game Devils of Destruction. However, creatures programmed by Kaine known as KillSims, which suck the life out of VirtNet players' Auras and leave their real-life bodies brain-dead, attack and destroy Ronika. Michael begins to have serious but occasional headaches. Michael and his friends then manage to gain access to The Path through Devils of Destruction, which they find very difficult to beat, after hacking through the age restriction. Once they enter The Path, they find themselves on a massive stone disk with a riddle. After solving it, they enter an infinitely long corridor, from which the only exit is to go through a hole in the wall. The three best friends have to overcome their fears to keep moving on. At one point, Bryson's Aura is killed by strange, animated corpses that attack whenever anybody makes noise. Along the way, they meet Gunner Skale, a legendary gamer who mysteriously disappeared from the VirtNet, who leads them to realizing that Kaine is actually a rogue Tangent, or an AI in the VirtNet. After escaping from Skale, as he attempted to kill them, Michael and Sarah continue on The Path, but Sarah's Aura is also killed when she is burned by lava. Eventually, Michael reaches a crossroads, where he is given the choice of either leaving the Path or entering the Hallowed Ravine. When he chooses the Hallowed Ravine, a silver machine destroys his Core, so that if his Aura were to die, he would die in real life. After reaching the Hallowed Ravine and discovering a group of Tangents controlled by Kaine, the VNS sends agents to his location to attack. However, in the ensuing battle, with the KillSims attacking, a large number of VNS agents die. Kaine manages to force Michael into a room, from which Michael escapes, allowed by Kaine to do so. He is attacked by KillSims, but he uses his hacking ability to delete, rather than manipulate, things, for the first time. Michael suffers another headache and begs Kaine to save him. Michael then wakes up in a Coffin, or a coffin-like enclosure from which the VirtNet is accessed, but realizes that his body and his surroundings are different. He finds that Kaine left him a message that explained how Michael was a Tangent, and that he was the first successful subject of The Mortality Doctrine, which implants Tangent intelligence into human bodies. Michael is also told that since he is now human, his headaches were actually caused by Decay, a condition that results from the deterioration of a Tangent's code. Michael then realizes that he had resided in the game Lifeblood Deep during his time as a Tangent, and when he had entered his Coffin, he had entered the game used by human beings, Lifeblood. He opens the door and meets Agent Weber, the VNS agent who contracted him to stop Kaine, who informs him that Bryson and Sarah are real. He is also told to attempt to impersonate the human whose body he is in.

== Development ==
While developing The Eye of Minds, Dashner wanted to avoid creating a world that was too similar to his earlier work, the Maze Runner series. Dashner's goal was for the book to feel different, unique, surprising. "I wanted the Path to have the feel of levels within a game, but have the stages vastly different from each other and meant for varying purposes." Dashner enjoyed employing the virtual reality setting, as it allowed him an "endless" amount of worlds and settings for the novel. He drew inspiration for the book from multiple book and film sources, particularly The Matrix and Inception. Dashner has stated that he plans for the series' story arc to only span three books, as he felt that it "really [works] out well for what I want to happen overall" but that he does view the series as being more open to sequels than his earlier work Maze Runner.

== Reception ==
Critical reception has been mostly positive. The School Library Journal and Booklist both gave The Eye of Minds a positive review, as both compared it positively to Dashner's Maze Runner series, with the School Library Journal stating that it "delivers an adrenaline rush." The Christian Science Monitor remarked that while they occasionally grew frustrated with "Dashner’s love affair with his own slang", they enjoyed the book greatly and thought that it would have a wide appeal. The Deseret News cautioned that The Eye of Minds had "relentless violence, blood, injury and mayhem", but that it was also "constant tension for a debatable end reward."

== Sequels ==
Two sequels to The Eye of Minds have been published, including The Rule of Thoughts and The Game of Lives. A short story has also been published, titled "Gunner Skale".
