= Brian Despain =

American artist

- Born: January 26, 1971; Calumet, Michigan
- Education: Eastern Michigan University
- Known for: illustration, Fine art, Fantasy art

Brian Despain is an artist whose work has appeared in galleries, in video games, on book covers and in role-playing games.

== Career ==
Despain has worked as a graphic designer, 3D modeler, photo retoucher, and illustrator. He worked for ten years in the video game industry, mainly at Snowblind Studios in Seattle, Washington, where he helped ship multiple titles and worked on many unannounced projects. In October 1999, Despain left his career in video games to pursue his own projects, working and writing full-time at his home studio. Though his work is often lumped in the underground movement of Pop Surrealism, he considers himself to belong to the Symbolist movement. Besides painting for galleries and private collectors, he occasionally does professional illustration work. His art appears on the covers of the poetry collections HUM and The Big Book of Exit Strategies by Detroit writer Jamaal May, as well as multiple young-adult fiction book covers, including "Arthur and the Minimoys" by French film mogul Luc Besson and "The Clockwork Three" by Matthew J. Kirby. He has contributed artwork for the Magic: The Gathering and Hearthstone card games. His Dungeons & Dragons work includes the 3.5 edition Monster Manual and Lost Empires of Faerûn.
