= Icefall (novel) =

2011 book by Matthew J. Kirby

- Author: Matthew J. Kirby
- Genre: Young adult fiction, Fantasy, Mystery, Adventure
- Published: 2011
- Publisher: Scholastic Press
- Pages: 324
- Awards: Edgar Award for Best Juvenile (2012)
- ISBN: 978-0-545-27424-1

Icefall is a book written by American author Matthew J. Kirby and published by Scholastic Press on October 1, 2011. It later went on to win the Edgar Award for Best Juvenile in 2012.

== Plot summary ==
The novel is set in medieval Norway. When the king goes to war, he sends his three children to a remote steading for protection. His oldest daughter Asa, the middle child, Solveig, who begins to learn the art of storytelling from the king's skald, and the youngest child and heir to the throne Harald. During a frightening winter, the household has to deal with food shortages and the mystery of a murderous traitor.
