= The Scorch Trials =

2010 novel by James Dashner

- The Scorch Trials
- Author: James Dashner
- Cover artist: Dennis Louis
- Language: English
- Series: The Maze Runner series
- Genre: Young adult, science fiction, post-apocalyptic
- Publisher: Delacorte Press
- Publication date: 18 September 2010
- Publication place: United States
- Media type: Print (hardcover and paperback), audiobook, e-book
- Pages: 360 pp.
- ISBN: 978-0-385-73875-0
- OCLC: 502029786
- LC Class: PZ7.D2587 Sc 2010
- Preceded by: The Maze Runner
- Followed by: The Death Cure

The Scorch Trials is a 2010 young adult post-apocalyptic dystopian science fiction novel written by American author James Dashner, the second book, fourth chronologically, in The Maze Runner series. The novel was published on 18 September 2010 by Delacorte Press. It follows The Maze Runner, and is followed by The Death Cure. A film adaptation was released on 18 September 2015 by 20th Century Fox.

== Plot ==
Thomas is sleeping in the dormitory with the other teenagers, known as the Gladers, who escaped from the Maze in the previous book and had been brought by a group of rescuers. Thomas is woken by a telepathic communication with Teresa, the only girl from the Glade, who is afraid.

As Thomas wakes up, he finds that the facility is being attacked by Cranks, aggressive zombie-like people that have been infected by a plague known as the Flare. The disease attacks the brain and causes victims to lose their humanity, rendering them violent and insane creatures. Cranks were normal citizens before the Flare, when they became crazed zombie-like killers.

Thomas and the others escape into the facility's common area and discover that their rescuers are dead. They also find that Teresa is missing from her room, and in her place is a boy, Aris Jones. Aris explains he escaped from a similar Maze experiment, Group B, in which he was the only male. The boys then discover tattoos on their necks that assign them specific roles and fates. Thomas is stunned by his tattoo as his fate was written as “to be killed by Group B” which makes him worry more.

The Gladers re-enter the common area and find that the bodies of their rescuers have disappeared. Since nothing has changed, the Gladers almost die of starvation. Thomas takes a rest and after waking up, he finds Minho with an apple. They meet a scientist from WICKED, described by the boys as 'Rat Man' because of his rat-like appearance, who explains WICKED has been studying them to try to find a cure for the Flare. He tells them they have been infected with the Flare and in two weeks must get through the Scorch, the most burned-out section of the Earth after the sun flares, to find a safe haven and get the cure. To get into the Scorch, the Gladers go through a Flat Trans, which is a type of portal that closes five minutes after the set hour.

The Gladers travel to the Scorch through the Flat Trans and find themselves in a tunnel filled with metal slicing mechanisms that kills at least two Gladers and nearly kills Winston. They escape into the desert and find a building in which a girl is screaming. Thomas discovers that the screaming is artificial and enters the building to find Teresa, who kisses him and tells him that he needs to stay away from her.

As the Gladers search for supplies, Thomas begins to recover memories of the relationship that he had with Teresa before his memories were removed. They travel to a distant city, but are caught in a lightning storm that wipes out half of the group and kills Winston and Jack. They take refuge in a building and find a group of Cranks led by a man named Jorge. Minho attacks Jorge, so Jorge sentences him to death before Thomas talks him out of it. Thomas also convinces Jorge and his second-in-command, the teenage girl Brenda, to help the Gladers escape in exchange for some of the cure. Thomas and Brenda get separated from the rest of the group, and Thomas discovers a message written all over the city that says that he is the real leader. After a quick meal, the group is attacked and separated. Thomas and Brenda are then suddenly captured by another group of Cranks, who get them high on drugs and hallucinating. Brenda tries to kiss Thomas before they pass out, but he refuses her advances because of his feelings for Teresa and insults her, saying that she could never be Teresa.

Minho rescues them with the help of the other Gladers, but Thomas is shot in the shoulder with a rusty bullet that leads to an infection. Thomas's wounds get worse, and WICKED takes him aboard a flying vehicle, called a Berg, to heal his infection. A healed Thomas is returned to the Gladers, where Thomas explains that WICKED never wanted him to get shot and considers him very important to its plans. Thomas later receives a telepathic message from Teresa that warns him something terrible is about to happen, and she cannot help him.

The Gladers come across Group B, now led by Teresa. Group B takes Thomas prisoner, and Teresa says that she plans to kill him. Some of the other Group B girls tell Thomas that Teresa had never liked him and that their earlier kiss had been against her will. The girls, Harriett and Sonya, tell Thomas that they are not going to kill him and that Teresa is unhappy about the situation.

Later, Teresa comes to Thomas with Aris. Teresa and Aris kiss passionately and tell him that they've known each other longer than Thomas may have thought, and she explains that she has been manipulating Thomas all along. They lock Thomas in a room, where he passes out due to a gas. While unconscious, he remembers some of his past relationship with Teresa and Aris before he entered the Maze. Eventually, Thomas is rescued by Aris and Teresa, who explain that they were forced by WICKED to make Thomas feel totally betrayed and that if they had not complied, WICKED would have killed him. Thomas is conflicted and no longer trusts them.

The Gladers and Group B reach the place that the safe haven is supposed to be as another lightning storm approaches. However, they are attacked by monsters created by WICKED until another Berg arrives from WICKED. They fight their way on board. WICKED, however, will allow either Jorge or Brenda to board, and the one not chosen to stay will be killed. Thomas chooses Brenda in the hope that WICKED will take whoever he does not choose. When it fails to do so, he overpowers the guard and forces him at gunpoint to allow both of them to remain on the Berg. The guard agrees and tells them that it was yet another test.

Later, as they rest, Teresa communicates telepathically with Thomas, who awakens separated from his friends in a plain white room and after he was left in isolation for a long time. Teresa tells him telepathically that the others are being told he has succumbed to the Flare. Still not trusting her, Thomas tells Teresa to leave him alone. She tells him "WICKED is good" before she cuts off communication.

The epilogue is in the form of an email from Chancellor Ava Paige, who writes that WICKED will soon tell the Gladers whether or not they are immune to the Flare.

== Characters ==
- Thomas (named after Thomas Edison): The main protagonist of the series. A teenage boy who is a Runner in the Glade. He discovered he had a part in helping WICKED and building the Maze when he was stung by a Griever. He has the ability to speak telepathically with Aris and Teresa. The tattoo on the back of his neck given to him by WICKED researchers says, "To be killed by Group B". Thomas struggles with many conflicts throughout the book, such as becoming the real leader, being betrayed by Teresa, and most importantly, surviving the Scorch. This causes him to become confused and hurt.
- Teresa Agnes (named after Mother Teresa): Cares for Thomas, as she was his close friend before the trials. She can speak telepathically with Thomas and Aris. She spends much of the novel with Group B, of which she becomes the leader. She gets under the control of WICKED at times and even kisses Thomas, which makes it difficult for Thomas to trust her. She was to be known as "The Betrayer".
- Newt (named after Isaac Newton): A boy with long, blonde hair, a slight limp, a muscular build, and a strange accent (which is presumed to be British). Newt is a kind and level-headed character, who takes care of the other surviving gladers. Newt is especially close with Thomas, but is also friends with Minho, Frypan, and the rest of the boys in their group. The tattoo on the back of his neck designates him as "The Glue" because he holds them all together.
- Minho: A teenage boy who was the Keeper of the Runners in the Glade. He is aggressive, stubborn, and sassy, which gets him in trouble frequently. He is friends with Newt, Thomas, and all the other Gladers. The tattoo on the back on his neck shows WICKED intended for him to be "The Leader".
- Siggy/Frypan: A boy who escaped the maze. He was the Glade's cook and is always careful with food. He is described as dark skinned and hairy with a beard though he is still a teenager.
- Aris Jones: Another boy who was involved with WICKED before the Maze. His role in his group was similar to that of Teresa's. He can speak telepathically with Thomas and Teresa and his best friend, Rachel, who was killed when Group B escaped their Maze. The tattoo on his neck designates him as "The Partner".
- Jorge: A man who presents himself as the leader of the Cranks. He appears to be dangerous and psychotic, yet also humorous. He is a father-figure towards Brenda. He helps the Gladers to get past the Scorch and expects a cure for himself and Brenda.
- Brenda: A very handsy girl from Canada, who claimed to be turning into a Crank. Both Jorge and Brenda help lead the Gladers through the Scorch. Brenda leads Thomas after they become separated from the rest of the group. Brenda has a crush on Thomas and flirts with him consistently. However their relationship is soured after drugs cause her to act on her feelings and him to insult her.
- Rat Man: The first WICKED researcher to identify himself to the Gladers. He informs them that they are infected with the Flare and how to get its cure. In The Death Cure, Rat Man is identified as Assistant Director Janson.
- Ava Paige: The chancellor of WICKED who is responsible for arranging for teenagers to be sent to the Maze for study into research for a cure for the Flare.

== Film adaptation ==
On October 11, 2013, it was reported that Fox had acquired the rights to The Scorch Trials. A screenplay was to be written by T. S. Nowlin, with director Wes Ball supervising the scriptwriting. The film was titled Maze Runner: The Scorch Trials. On 25 July 2014 Ball announced at San Diego Comic-Con that they wanted to start shooting in Fall 2014 should its predecessor become a success when it hit the theaters in September 2014; also unveiling a concept image at the conference – which implied that he will be directing the sequel as well. However, two weeks prior to the film's release 20th Century Fox decided to move ahead with the sequel and pre-production as well as prepping the sets began in early September 2014 in New Mexico. Director Wes Ball was set to return, as were actors Dylan O'Brien, Ki Hong Lee, Thomas Brodie-Sangster, Kaya Scodelario. On 26 September 2014, The Hollywood Reporter reported that Aidan Gillen was signed in to play the antagonist, Rat Man in the sequel. On 1 October 2014, it was announced that Rosa Salazar and Jacob Lofland had signed to play Brenda and Aris Jones, respectively. On 3 October 2014, it was announced that Giancarlo Esposito was to play Jorge in the film. Creature designer Ken Barthelmey designed the creatures for the film. The first official trailer was released on 19 May 2015.
