= The 13th Reality =

Book by James Dashner

- The Journal of Curious Letters; The Hunt for Dark Infinity; The Blade of Shattered Hope; The Void of Mist and Thunder
- Author: James Dashner
- Cover artist: John Picacio
- Country: United States
- Language: English
- Genre: Young adult, science fiction
- Publisher: Shadow Mountain
- Published: 2008–2012
- Media type: Print (hardcover and paperback), e-book
- No. of books: 4

The 13th Reality is a young adult science fiction book series by American writer James Dashner. The first book in the series (The Journal of Curious Letters) was published in early 2008 by Shadow Mountain Publishing. The second book was released on May 1, 2009, and was titled The Hunt for Dark Infinity, and book three was released April 6, 2010. It is titled The Blade of Shattered Hope. The fourth book, The Void of Mist and Thunder, was released as an eBook on July 10, 2012, and was released as a hardcover in September 2012. A 2096-page boxed set was issued by Aladdin Paperbacks in 2013.

== Plot summary ==
Atticus "Tick" Higginbottom is an average 13-year-old until he receives a mysterious letter from Alaska, signed "M.G." That marks the beginning of a deadly and crazy adventure, and Tick is reintroduced to the world as he never knew it. Accompanied by new friends while he tries to evade frightful enemies, he sets off on a life-threatening journey through the Realities, alternate worlds created every time a choice is made, to discover secrets and to solve missions.

== Characters ==
- Atticus 'Tick' Higginbottom — The 13-year-old main protagonist of the series lives in Deer Park, Washington, of Reality Prime. He is introduced to the Realities after being recruited by Master George through a series of curious letters and clues, becoming a fully-fledged Realitant.
- Master George (M.G.) — The old, short, quirky leader of the Realitants.
- Mistress Jane — The main antagonist of the series was once a Realitant, but she betrayed her kind after she got her hands on the mutated power of the 13th Reality. She is now seeking to create a Utopia Reality. Her favourite color is yellow, and she is bald in the first book.
- 'Mothball' — A Realitant from the 5th Reality, where everyone is tall and speaks with a thick British accent. She was given her strange name when Bugaboo soldiers were attacking her family.
- Rutger — A Realitant from the 11th Reality and Mothball's best friend. He is short and fat, like everyone else in the 11th Reality.
- Sofia Pacini — Sofia is a 12-year-old girl from a rich Italian family known for its spaghetti. She is recruited to the Realitants the same way as Tick, by letters. Although sometimes snappy and mean, she is known for her brains and for being tough as nails.
- Paul Rogers — A 14-year-old boy from Florida, he, like Tick and Sofia, was recruited by Master George's letters. He can be a little full of himself, and his love for cracking jokes causes him frequently to butt heads with Sofia.
- Sato — An orphaned boy from Japan whose parents used to be Realitants until they died from Mistress Jane's power. Because Master George was there at the scene Sato became reluctant to trust him, which slowly extended to everyone.
- Edgar Higginbottom — Tick's outgoing father who loves to eat. He is the first to know about Tick receiving the letters and trusts his son unconditionally.
- Lorena Higginbottom — Tick's mother, who is later revealed to be a Realitant as well.
- Kayla Higginbottom — Tick's younger sister who is only 4 years old. She loves to burn objects in the fireplace and play tea party.
- Lisa Higginbottom — Tick's 15-year-old older sister. She plays horribly on the piano and likes to talk on the phone.
- Reginald Chu — Tick's science teacher in Reality Prime. His Alterant (the alternate version of someone in different realities) is the genius owner of Chu Industries in the 4th Reality, famed for his business skills and ruthlessness.
- Windasill — Mothball's mother.
- Tollaseat — Mothball's father.
- Frazier Gunn — Mistress Jane's loyal servant.
- Annika — A spy for the Realitants until she is found out by Frazier and killed by Mistress Jane's pets, the fangen.

== Reception ==
Kirkus Reviews labeled The Journal of Curious Letters science fiction for ages 10–12 and called it "the start of a series that will capture the imagination of young and old alike. ... though there are chunks of text that are overwritten, the telling is generally laced with a strong sense of humor and a sure hand at plot; the author is plainly in tune with today's fan base." One year later, Kirkus labeled The Hunt for Dark Infinity fantasy for ages 10 and up. The story features the "next assignment" for "the trio" Tick, Paul, and Sofia. "Readers will be as puzzled as the characters, who tumble from one complex and outrageous situation to the next, rescued from each at the last minute—sometimes with no explanation. But it all holds together remarkably well, encouraging suspension of disbelief to make way for glorious flights of imagination." Kirkus credited illustrator Bryan Beus but did not comment on his contribution. Evidently it did not cover the third or fourth volume at all.

== Books ==
The Journal of Curious Letters
- Author: James Dashner
- Illustrator: Bryan Beus
- Cover artist: Brayn Beus
- Language: English
- Series: The 13th Reality
- Publisher: Shadow Mountain Publishing
- Publication date: 2008
- Publication place: United States
- Pages: 417
- ISBN: 978-1-59038-831-0
- OCLC: 179801453
- Followed by: The Hunt for Dark Infinity

=== The 13th Reality: The Journal of Curious Letters ===
The 13th Reality: The Journal of Curious Letters was published in 2008 novel.

==== Summary ====
Atticus Higginbottom, a.k.a. Tick, is an average thirteen-year-old boy until the day a strange letter arrives in his mailbox. Postmarked from Alaska and cryptically signed with the initials "M.G.," the letter informs Tick that dangerous—perhaps even deadly—events have been set in motion that could result in the destruction of reality itself. M.G. promises to send Tick twelve riddles that will reveal on a certain day, a certain time, and a certain place, something extraordinary will happen!

The Hunt for Dark Infinity
- Author: James Dashner
- Illustrator: Bryan Beus
- Cover artist: Brayn Beus
- Language: English
- Series: The 13th Reality
- Publisher: Shadow Mountain Publishing
- Publication date: 2009
- Publication place: United States
- Pages: 433
- ISBN: 978-1-60641-034-9
- Preceded by: The Journal of Curious Letter
- Followed by: The Blade of Shattered Hope

=== The 13th Reality: The Hunt for Dark Infinity ===
The 13th Reality: The Hunt for Dark Infinity was published in 2009.

==== Summary ====
Reginald Chu, the alterant of Tick's science teacher has created a powerful and deadly new invention called 'Dark Infinity' and it's sending the Reality's people off the edge of sanity. Due to Tick's uncanny talent for controlling The Chi'Karda, Chu wants either Tick or Mistress Jane to help control the power of the Dark Infinity and help him control The Realities, but Master George won't have any of that. Tick is forced to team up with Mistress Jane in an all out attempt to stop Chu and his evil reign over the 4th Reality. Join Tick and his friends as they travel through the Realities, completing various riddles made by Chu to see if Tick is worthy enough to kill Mistress Jane and help Chu control everything.

=== Dashner's other books ===
- Dashner, James (2010). The 13th Reality: The Blade of Shattered Hope. Salt Lake City: ShadowMountain. ISBN 978-1-60641-239-8.
- Dashner, James (2012). The 13th Reality: The Void of Mist and Thunder. Salt Lake City: ShadowMountain. ISBN 978-1-60908-055-6.
