= The Clockwork Three =

2010 novel by Matthew J. Kirby

- Author: Matthew J. Kirby
- Cover artist: Brian Despain
- Language: English
- Genre: Historical fiction Children's fiction
- Publisher: Scholastic
- Publication date: October 1, 2010
- Publication place: United States
- Media type: Print (hardcover) and Audiobook
- Pages: 400
- ISBN: 0-545-20337-6

The Clockwork Three is a 2010 novel by American author Matthew J. Kirby. Set in a fictional coastal city in the late nineteenth century, it follows three children: Giuseppe, Hannah, and Frederick who work to solve each other's problems.

== Origins ==
The idea for The Clockwork Three came to Kirby when he read a story of a boy named Joseph in a newspaper from 1873. Joseph got kidnapped from Italy and had to play a fiddle in English streets to earn money for his master, until he eventually escaped.

== Plot ==
One day, Giuseppe finds a green violin floating in the harbor and he tries it out. He finds that it gives a very beautiful sound, and he is thrown money from people everywhere in the streets. He gets an idea to use his green violin to buy a boat ticket back to Italy, where he had been taken from. For once, Giuseppe has hope in getting back to his family. Frederick is going around in search of a chest plate for his clockwork man. While wandering the streets, Frederick catches a glimpse of Mrs. Treeless, the woman in charge of an orphanage.

Frederick had been in before becoming apprenticed to Master Branch, which reminds him of the awful memories he had at the orphanage. He also bumps into Giuseppe, but Giuseppe runs along with his violin. Later, he finds a coal chute, perfect for the chest plate, and sneaks it out of a coal yard. While he sneaks out, he lies about his father being one of the workers at the mine. He goes back to Master Branch's shop, where Frederick is an apprentice, and once he decides that Master Branch is asleep, he goes to the basement of the shop to work on his clockwork man. Hannah discovers that a man named Mister Stroop supposedly left the treasure in the suites at the top of the hotel. She later sees a map that hints it may be near a pond in the park. She runs to look for it when she desperately needs money for her sick father's medicine. There she meets Giuseppe, and the two look for the treasure but it is not there, though she receives some herbal medicine from a woman who lives in the park. Hannah's father draws for her where the treasure is hidden in the hotel, having worked for Stroop's hotel in the past.

The next day the three children all meet for the first time and Frederick shows the other two his automaton. The three agree to help each other out with their problems. Giuseppe mentions that he saw a clockwork head—Frederick's only missing piece—in a museum. The three sneak into the museum so Frederick can inspect the head, but they are interrupted by guards and forced to flee. Frederick escapes with the stolen head, which was made by Albertus Magnus. Hannah also accidentally took a small piece of clay belonging to a golem and inserts it into the Clockwork Man thus bringing the Clockwork Man to life. This, coupled with the Magnus head, gives it near-human intelligence.

Hannah discovers that Mister Stroop's treasure is his will, witnessed by the hotel's owner, Mister Twine. She and Frederick talk to him, but Hannah refuses to take the money because it would cause the park to be destroyed. Mister Twine promotes her to the chief of maids and gives her quite a bit of money for new dresses, a portion of which she gives to Giuseppe for his ticket. A law was passed that the padrones no longer had legal control over their buskers. Enraged, Stefano tries to kill Giuseppe, but he is saved by Yakov, who shoots Stephano in the head with his gun. Madame Pomeroy asks Giuseppe to travel with her to play his green violin for kings and queens, and thus, Giuseppe accepts. Frederick eventually becomes a journeyman, and Hannah's father's health improves. The story ends with an epilogue in which Frederick has created a clockwork bird and shows it to Hannah. It begins to hum a tune that Giuseppe played on his violin, and Hannah's father's toes begin to tap, showing that his leg still works.

== Characters ==
- Giuseppe* is an eleven-year-old boy who has lived in America for six years. His parents are dead, but his siblings still live in Italy. He keeps a stash of money in a graveyard to save up for a ticket to Italy that he finds from a green violin.
- Hannah is a twelve-year-old girl who had to abandon school to work as a maid in a hotel. She loves reading and used to own seven books, but had to sell six of them. She has two very young twin sisters, a mother, and a father who used to be a fine stonemason but is currently sick with apoplexy and in need of help. Hannah became Madame Pomeroy's personal assistant. It is hinted she has feelings for Frederick.
- Frederick is a thirteen-year-old apprentice clockmaker who wishes to work on his own. His father died and his mother left him due to illness when he was young and he spent time in an orphanage before a clockmaker discovered his talent and employed him as an apprentice. He is secretly building an automaton and hopes it will promote him to his own business. He seems to feel nervous around Hannah and possibly has a crush on her.
- Madame Pomeroy is a large woman who employed Hannah as her personal assistant after Miss Wool lost her temper and yelled at her, thus saving Hannah from being fired. She is quite rich and is thought to be able to communicate with the dead.
- Yakov is Madame Pomeroy's Russian bodyguard. He is considered her "golem" and has a gift of telling the future. He owns a gun in the shape of a leaping tiger.
- Stephano is Giuseppe's abusive padrone.
- Master Branch is the clockmaker who employed Frederick as an apprentice. He greatly cares for Frederick and sticks up for him.
- Pietro is a small boy who had trouble making money for Stephano by playing his tin whistle. Giuseppe begins to care for him. He ends up under the care of Reverend Grey.
- Miss Wool is a woman who is chief of the maids at the hotel. She is after the treasure and shows Hannah no mercy. She is fired at the end by the hotel's manager, Mister Twine, and Hannah is offered her position.

== Critical reception ==
Publishers Weekly gave The Clockwork Three a starred review, saying "debut novelist Kirby has assembled all the ingredients for a rousing adventure, which he delivers with rich, transporting prose." The website Kidsreads also gave the book a positive review, saying "With plenty of steampunk elements and more than a few hints of violence, The Clockwork Three is, in many ways, as dark and menacing as its hard-edged setting." Another review came from Deseret News, praising the imagery. Kirkus Reviews was more mixed, calling it "an interesting concept" but thought the ending was too obvious and the children became less interesting as the story went along.
