= The Kill Order =

2012 book by James Dashner

- Book cover of The Kill Order
- Author: James Dashner
- Cover artist: Philip Strub
- Language: English
- Series: The Maze Runner series
- Genre: Young adult, dystopian, science fiction
- Publisher: Delacorte Press
- Publication date: August 14, 2012
- Publication place: United States
- Media type: Print (hardcover and paperback), audiobook, e-book
- Pages: 327
- ISBN: 978-0-385-74288-7
- OCLC: 793655614
- LC Class: PZ7.D2587 Kil 2012
- Followed by: The Fever Code

The Kill Order is a 2012 young adult dystopian science fiction novel written by American author James Dashner and published on August 14, 2012, by Delacorte Press. It is the first prequel book in The Maze Runner series and the fourth installment overall. The book is set prior to the events of The Fever Code and 13 years before The Maze Runner book.

== Plot ==
Before entering the Maze, Thomas goes through the Swipe and is put in the Box, as he is one of the candidates needed inside. He is told that Teresa will also get the Swipe. Thomas is then sent into the Maze with Teresa being sent in shortly after.

The story takes place 13 years before the events of the first book. In New York City, the main protagonists are Mark and Trina, a young teenage couple who reside in the city along with U.S. military soldiers Alec and Lana. One day, massive solar flares devastated the planet, with New York caught in one.

Mark, Trina, Alec, Lana, and several other survivors escape to the Lincoln Building to evade an impending tsunami. This tsunami, however, is boiling hot and kills most of the population in New York. They camp out in the building for weeks until a yacht arrives, but the yacht's crew takes them hostage, demanding that they surrender all the food in the Lincoln Building. Alec manages to overcome their captors, and they take the yacht to the Appalachians.

A year after the solar flares devastated the planet, the group resides in Asheville, North Carolina with residents Toad, Misty, and Darnell. Soon, a fleet of large hover aircraft called Bergs arrives and shoots at the people. Alec and Mark manage to subdue and take over a Berg, but its pilot crashes the vehicle to avoid being interrogated by them. After surviving the crash, they discover that the ammunition contains a deadly virus, and they start their long journey back to their town.

Three days later, they arrive in town to find that the virus has killed most of the infected. Lana and Trina explain that after the initial deaths, people lived longer before succumbing, and symptoms have changed. Mark and Alec clarify that the ammunition contained a virus, leading the group to suspect the virus was mutating.

Darnell exhibits signs of infection and pleads with Trina and Lana to lock him up, which they do, and is confined for days. He becomes increasingly ill and hallucinates due to the virus. As his symptoms worsen, he repeatedly bangs his head against a wall, ultimately leading to his death. Soon, Misty becomes infected and displays the same symptoms as Darnell, forcing the group to confine her. Toad kills her before showing signs of the same infection, which leads Alec to kill Toad.

Mark and Alec take Lana and Trina to find the mysterious attackers' base. They pass through an abandoned village and meet a five-year-old girl, Deedee, who joins them. She reveals her village was attacked months ago, leaving her behind. Deedee shows a puncture mark caused by the Berg's attack, indicating she was infected but has been symptom-free for months. The group discovers that Deedee is immune to the virus.

Mark and Alec leave their group to investigate a loud noise. They discover a cult of infected people who believe Deedee, who is immune to the virus, is a demon. After escaping the cult, they find a forest fire, and Trina, Lana, and Deedee vanish from their campsite. Assuming the girls have moved on to the attackers' base, Mark and Alec proceed to the site.

They sneak into the Post-Flares Coalition (PFC) site, where they learn that Katie McVoy created a virus called "the Flare." This virus shuts down brain function as a form of population control to conserve the planet's resources. However, the virus has mutated.

The girls are returned to the infected cult. After being caught, they escape with a Berg, discovering the "Transvices" are guns that evaporate molecules. Mark realizes that the Flare virus has already infected him.

They fly the Berg back to Asheville, where the city is already under siege by the infected. They find the infected Lana, who is severely wounded after having been tortured by them. Alec kills her with the Transvice to end her suffering. They locate Trina and Deedee at an old house, but Mark discovers that Trina, who also has the Flare, has forgotten him.

After a brief attack from the infected, they escape to the Berg. As Mark loses sanity, he realizes Deedee must be taken to the PFC base in Alaska because she is immune. He plans to deliver her using a teleporter, a "Flat Trans", at a secure PFC base in Asheville. Meanwhile, Alec is also succumbing to the Flare.

Mark and Trina bring Deedee to safety at the Alaska PFC base. Mark tells Alec to crash the Berg into the flat trans building to trap the infected in Asheville. Trina remembers Mark one last time before the Berg crashes, killing everyone and destroying the flat trans.

Two years later, authorities from the World In Catastrophe: Killzone Experiment Department (WICKED) take a little boy named Stephen away from his mother because he is immune to the virus and rename him Thomas.

== Characters ==
- Mark: A 17-year-old young man who survived the onslaught of the Flare and finds himself living with his neighbor Trina and war veterans Alec and Lana, along with a few others in the Appalachians.
- Alec: A war veteran who came to rescue Mark and Trina shortly before a giant tsunami caused by the melting polar ice caps hit New York City.
- Trina: Mark's neighbor and love interest who was with him when the Flare first hit the Earth and has since lived with other survivors in a small Appalachian village.
- Lana: A war nurse with a close relationship with Alec. The two accompany Mark and Trina ever since the onslaught of the Flare and the immediate tsunami that devastated New York City.
- Deedee / Teresa: A 5-year-old girl Mark, Alec, Trina, and Lana find in a deserted neighboring village. She is immune to the Flare virus, a status demonized by her fellow villagers. Due to this, Mark decides to send her to the Post-Flare Coalition (PFC) base in Alaska, where she would be renamed Teresa after Mother Teresa. In the second epilogue, Deedee is revealed to be Teresa from the original trilogy. She sees the infected as worthy of saving due to her experiences with Mark, Trina, and Alec, who tried to save her and the world despite suffering from the infection.
- Anton: A worker for the PFC who tells Mark and Alec about how the Flare virus is spread. He also tells them that he and his coworkers plan to move to the PFC base in Alaska, which gives Mark the idea to send Deedee there.
- Bruce: A worker for the PFC who had a hand in releasing the Flare virus in return for food for him and his coworkers. He complains about the restrictions put into the cure for the virus by the PFC base in Alaska.
- Toad, Misty, and Darnell: Three survivors of the Flare who are together referred to as "The Three Stooges". They live in the Appalachian makeshift village alongside Mark, Alec, Trina, and Lana.
- John Michael: The current chancellor of World in Catastrophe: Killzone Experiment Department (WICKED), the company that approved the population control suggested by Katie McVoy to eradicate half of the world population using the Flare virus.
- Katie McVoy: A member of WICKED who suggested to Chancellor Michael a form of population control by killing half of the population with the VC321xb47 virus, referred to as the Flare virus.
- Thomas: A 5-year-old boy immune to the Flare virus who WICKED takes from his willing mother in the novel's epilogue. A member of WICKED decides to name him after Thomas Edison after seeing a light bulb in his house. A grown Thomas is also mentioned in the prologue of the novel from the point of view of Teresa, just before he takes his entry to the Maze.

== Reception ==
Critical reception for The Kill Order was mostly positive. Publishers Weekly and KidzWorld both gave positive reviews for the book, with Publishers Weekly noting that fans of the main Maze Runner series would enjoy it.

== Sequel ==
On September 27, 2016, a sequel to The Kill Order was released, titled The Fever Code; taking place between the events of The Kill Order and The Maze Runner.
