= The Maze Runner (novel series) =

Dystopian novel series by James Dashner

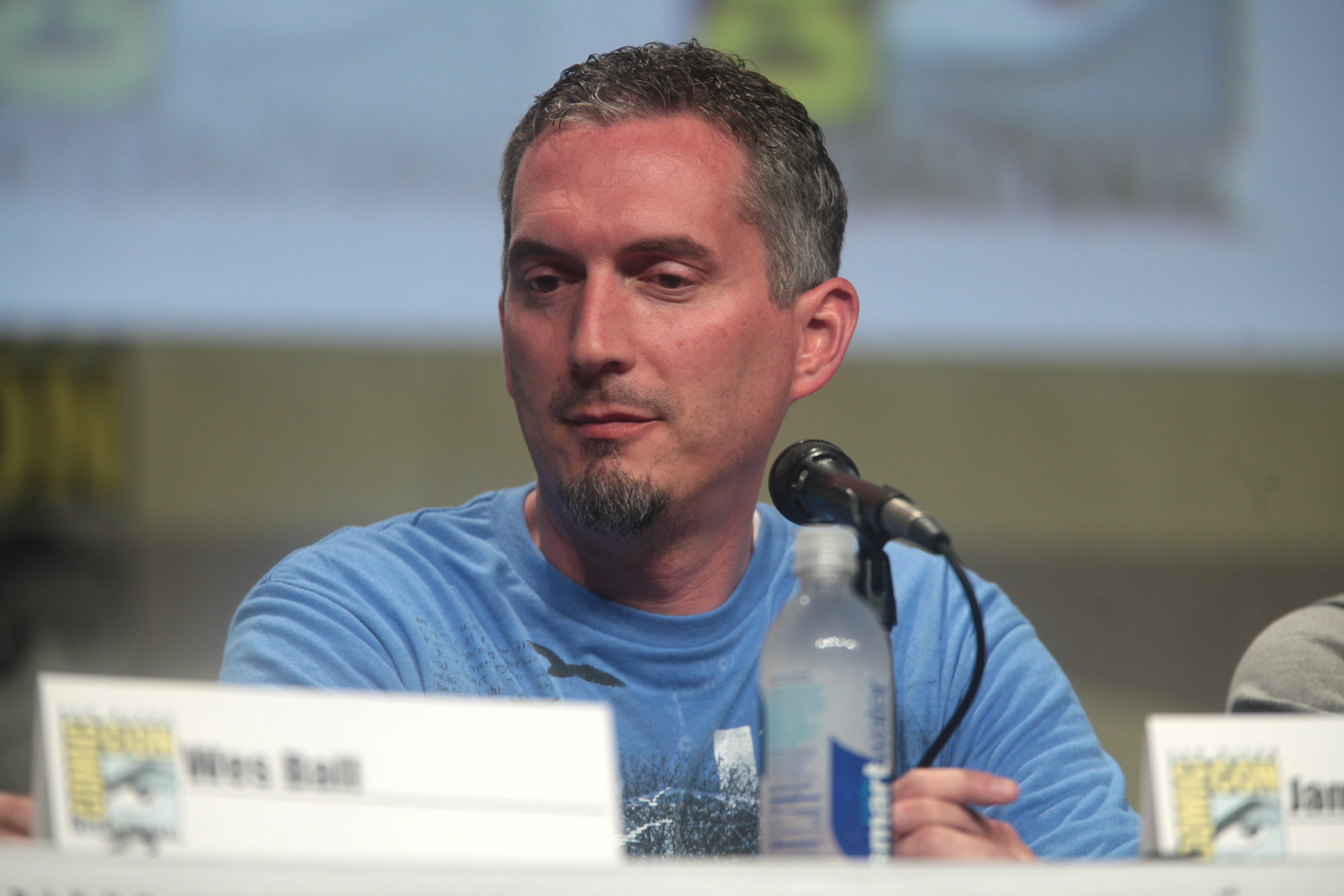
- The author James Dashner at Comicon in 2014
- Main series; The Maze Runner (2009); The Scorch Trials (2010); The Death Cure (2011); Prequel series; The Kill Order (2012); The Fever Code (2016); Sequel series; The Maze Cutter (2022); The Godhead Complex (2023); The Infinite Glade (2025); Companion books; The Maze Runner Files (2013); Crank Palace (2020)
- Author: James Dashner
- Cover artist: Philip Straub, Dennis Louis
- Country: United States
- Language: English
- Genre: Adventure; Science fiction Dystopian; Young adult fiction
- Publisher: Delacorte Press
- Published: 2009-Present
- Media type: Print (hardcover and paperback), audiobook, e-book
- No. of books: 8

The Maze Runner is a series of young adult dystopian science fiction novels written by American author James Dashner. The series consists of the trilogy The Maze Runner (2009), The Scorch Trials (2010) and The Death Cure (2011), as well as two prequel novels, The Kill Order (2012) and The Fever Code (2016). A novella titled Crank Palace (2020) and a companion book titled The Maze Runner Files (2013) have also been released. A sequel trilogy in the series titled The Maze Cutter takes place 73 years following the events of The Death Cure and consists of the novels The Maze Cutter (2022), The Godhead Complex (2023), and The Infinite Glade (2025).

The series, revealing details in non-chronological order, tells how the world was devastated by a series of massive solar flares and coronal mass ejections.

== Novels ==
=== The Maze Runner ===
The Maze Runner is the first book in the series and was released on October 6, 2009.

A group of teenagers, who call themselves "Gladers", are left in a strange place which they call the "Glade". The Glade is surrounded by four doors, leading to the Maze, that close every night at sundown and open in the morning. The Glade consists of multiple buildings including a homestead, map room, and "the slammer" which functions as a makeshift jail. It also consists of areas such as the "deadheads" (where the dead Gladers are buried), the animal pens, and a tree grove. Beyond the walls of the Glade is the ever-changing Maze, populated by horrifying, biomechanical creatures, called Grievers. Every month, a newcomer, nicknamed "Greenie", joins the Gladers, sent by a lift they call the Box. Each newcomer has all memories (except language and other common things) wiped out. The only thing that they remember is their name. They are watched by mechanical beetles, called 'beetle blades' which belong to their 'creators'. Each beetle blade has the word "WICKED" (World In Catastrophe Killzone Experiment Department) stamped across its back. The ultimate goal of the Gladers is to find a way out of the Maze. To do so, certain Gladers called "Runners" venture into the Maze every day, to map it in an attempt to find a pattern in the Maze that would lead them to find an exit. The main character, Thomas, arrives at the Glade. Shortly thereafter, a girl (Teresa) is sent up through the Box, arriving in a coma, and bringing the message: Everything is going to change. She bears a note saying "She's the last one. Ever." Thomas becomes an object of reverence, suspicion, and great curiosity to the Gladers due to his ties to all of the strange happenings in the Glade, fueled greatly after he becomes the first to survive a night inside the Maze. Together with new friends, such as Chuck (the second-newest newbie), Newt (second in command of the Gladers), and Minho (Keeper of the Runners), he begins to solve the mystery of the Maze and search for a way out. Thomas leads his group to make it out of the maze find a way back home and defeat WICKED.

=== The Scorch Trials ===
The Scorch Trials is the second book released in the series, on September 18, 2010.

The Gladers thought that getting through The Maze was it. They were wrong. The Maze was only the beginning, and now WICKED demands they undergo the Scorch Trials, in which they must cross The Scorch——a barren wasteland left burned and scarred by violent sun flares. What's worse, the denizens of The Scorch are being consumed by an infection known as The Flare, corrupting their very minds until they lose all that makes them human. The game is set again, and WICKED controls the board, but if the Gladers want another chance at freedom, they must play WICKED's game and survive The Scorch Trials.

=== The Death Cure ===
The Death Cure is the third book released in the series, on October 11, 2011.

In the third book of "The Maze Runner" Series, Thomas is locked up in solitary confinement for four weeks. Upon his release, Assistant Director Janson (Rat Man) reveals to him and the other subjects (including Group B) that there is no cure for the Flare, but that most of the Gladers and Group B are immune. He warns them that many people in the outside world hate them because of their unnatural resistance to the Flare, and that if they escape they will most likely be in more danger. Later, all Gladers and Group `B members' memories are restored and they escape. Thomas, Newt, and Minho refuse restoration and they later escape with Jorge and Brenda. They then go to a city and have WICKED's devices in their brains disabled. They join forces with "Right Arm", an organization fighting against WICKED.

=== The Kill Order ===
The Kill Order is the fourth book released in the series, on August 14, 2012.

It is the first novel in narrative order, set prior to the events of The Fever Code and 13 years before the events in The Maze Runner. It is followed in narrative order by The Fever Code.

Of the novel, Dashner stated that he wanted to expand the world, but not focus on the main characters of the main Maze Runner trilogy. He also stated that he had originally planned to write a prequel for the series, but that the plans did not become official until he had completed the third book in the trilogy.

Before WICKED is formed, before the Glade is built, and before Thomas enters the Maze, solar flares hit the earth and mankind was ravaged by disease. Mark and Trina were there when it happened, and survived. Now a disease of rage and lunacy races across the eastern United States, and there's something suspicious about its origin and it's mutating, and all evidence suggests that it will bring humanity to its knees. Mark and Trina are convinced there's a way to save those left living from descending into madness.

=== The Fever Code ===
The Fever Code is the fifth book released in the series, on September 27, 2016.

It is the second prequel and the fifth installment of The Maze Runner series. It is the second book in narrative order, preceded by The Kill Order and followed by The Maze Runner.

The book is set in between the events of The Kill Order and immediately before The Maze Runner. The novel is written from the various points of view of "The Gladers". The book primarily focuses on the training that Thomas and the others undergo before being sent into the Maze, however, it also explores the relationships between the Gladers before they underwent "the Swipe" that suppressed their memories, describes "the Purge" that is briefly mentioned in The Death Cure, and the lives of the Gladers before Thomas' insertion into the Maze, since during the events in the book he is working for WICKED. This book gives a background of the series, providing the reader with information they have been asking themselves. The book ends with the final moments before Thomas enters the Box, when he is betrayed and sent into the Maze at the beginning of The Maze Runner.

	Title	Pages	Chapters	Words	Released	Audio
1	The Maze Runner	374	62	101,182	October 2009	10h 50m
2	The Scorch Trials	361	65	96,869	September 2010	10h 53m
3	The Death Cure	325	73	87,385	October 2011	8h 55m
4	The Kill Order	384	69	86,710	August 2012	9h 58m
5	The Fever Code	347	64	86,565	September 2016	9h 57m
6	The Maze Cutter	328	16	79,731	November 2022	8h 47m
7	The Godhead Complex	272	25		November 2023	8h 34m
8	The Infinite Glade	280	29		April 2025	8h 0m
	Totals	2671	403	458,711		71h 54m

== The Maze Cutter series ==
=== The Maze Cutter ===
The Maze Cutter is the first book of a spin-off trilogy to The Maze Runner series. It was published on October 4, 2022 and on November 1, 2022 in North America. It is centered around the descendants of the Gladers, who encounter a ship from the mainland 73 years after the events of The Death Cure.

=== The Godhead Complex ===
The Godhead Complex is the second book in The Maze Cutter spin-off trilogy. It was published on November 14, 2023.

=== The Infinite Glade ===
The Infinite Glade is the third and final book in The Maze Cutter spin-off trilogy. It was announced in October 2024 and was released on September 9, 2025.

== Other releases ==
=== The Maze Runner Files ===
The Maze Runner Files is a companion book to The Maze Runner series. It was released on 1 January 2013 as an e-book and is 50 pages long. The book is divided into three parts: Confidential Files, Recovered Correspondence, and Suppressed Memories.

It contains information about the Flare, a disease caused because of a man-made disaster, WICKED, and some of the Gladers. It also reveals events such as Thomas and Teresa's first conversation, Minho's Phase Three Trial, Frypan's past, e-mails between WICKED correspondents, and more.

=== Crank Palace ===
Crank Palace is a novella, released on August 25, 2020. The story is centered on the character Newt and takes place during the events of The Death Cure. It was first released as an audiobook on August 25, 2020, while the print copy and ebook version was released on November 23 of the same year.

== Characters ==
- Thomas (books 1–3, 5, minor appearance in book 4) is one of the creators of the Maze along with Teresa Agnes, and later a Group A Glader in books 1–3. He is the main protagonist of the series, named after Thomas Edison. Thomas's name was Stephen before WICKED took him from his mother. His subject number is A2, and his title is "to be killed by Group B".
- Teresa Agnes (books 1–5) is a Group A Glader and a creator of the Maze with Thomas, named after Mother Teresa. She appears in book 4 under her original name Deedee. Her subject number is A1, and her title is "the betrayer".
- Newt (books 1–3, 5–6) is a British Group A Glader and Alby's second-in-command. He has a slight limp from attempting suicide when he was a Runner. Newt is named after Sir Isaac Newton. He is the brother of Sonya, a girl in Group B, who he called Lizzy. His subject number is A5, and his title is "the glue".
- Minho (books 1–3, 5) is an Asian Group A Glader and Keeper of the Runners. He later became Leader of the Gladers in the Scorch. Instead of being named after someone historically famous, he is named after James Dashner's niece's Korean husband. His subject number is A7, and his title is "the leader".
- Gally (books 1, 3, 5) is a Group A Glader who was Thomas's first enemy in the Glade. He serves as the main antagonist for Thomas in the first book, however, after being presumed dead for the second book, comes back to become an ally in the third. Gally is named after Galileo Galilei. His subject number is A9.
- Alby (book 1, 5) is the first-in-command and leader of the Gladers. He is named after Albert Einstein. His subject number is A6.
- Chuck (book 1, 5, mentioned in 2–3) is a Group A Glader who befriended Thomas in the Maze. He is Thomas' best friend. Chuck is named after Charles Darwin. His subject number is A4.
- Frypan (books 1–3, 5-8) is the former Keeper of the Cooks for Group A. He is named after Sigmund Freud. His original name was Toby before being taken by WICKED. His subject number is A3.
- Winston (books 1–2, mentioned in 3, 5) is the former keeper of the slicers for Group A. Winston is either named after Robert Winston or Winston Churchill. He was presumed to be killed by a lightning storm in the scorch trials. His subject number is A13.
- Chancellor Ava Paige (books 1–3, 5) is the highest-ranking official of WICKED. She initially opposed the use of Immunes for the Trials and also was one of the two people to oppose Thomas' death. However, she infected Chancellor Anderson with the Flare and forced Thomas into the Maze after Chancellor Anderson proposed to end the trials after the Maze Trials were finished. All epilogues of the three books consist of an e-mail written by Dr. Paige to her associates.
- Assistant Director Janson (books 2–3) nicknamed Rat Man in book 2, is the highest-ranking official in WICKED after Chancellor Paige.
- Jorge (books 2–3, 5) is a pilot for WICKED; he is later assigned by WICKED to work undercover as the leader of a group of Cranks in the Scorch.
- Brenda (books 2–3, 5) is a character that the members of Group A and B assumed to be a Crank. Eventually, they discover that she is an Immune.
- Aris Jones (books 2–3, 5) is the only male member in a group of female teenagers called Group B. He is named after Aristotle. His subject number is B1, and his title is "the partner".
- Rachel (mentioned in book 2, 5) is a member of Group B and the best friend of Aris Jones, with whom she had a telepathic connection. Her subject number is B2.
- Harriet (books 2–3) is one of the leaders of Group B. She is named after Harriet Tubman. Her subject number is B3.
- Sonya (books 2–3, 5) is one of the leaders of Group B along with Harriet, in the Group B Maze. She is the younger sister of Newt. Her name was originally Elizabeth; Newt calls her Lizzy. Her subject number is B5.
- Mark (book 4) is the main protagonist of The Kill Order. He survived the catastrophic solar flares and escaped to the Appalachians. He is Trina's love interest and committed suicide by telling Alec to fly the Berg into the building, killing them all, except Deedee, after succumbing to the Flare.
- Alec (book 4) is a veteran and a U.S. military pilot. He survived the solar flares to become one of the protagonists in The Kill Order.
- Trina (book 4) is one of the protagonists in The Kill Order. She was also the love interest of Mark.
- Lana (book 4) is a former military nurse and is one of the protagonists who survived the solar flares in The Kill Order. She was killed by Alec after Cranks fatally injured her.

== Critical reception ==
Kirkus Reviews wrote, "Dashner knows how to spin a tale and make the unbelievable realistic. Hard to put down, this is clearly just a first installment, and it will leave readers dying to find out what comes next."

Jessica Harrison of the Deseret Morning News described it as "a thrilling adventure that will get readers' hearts pumping and leave them asking for more." She noted that it "starts out a bit slow," but "as Thomas settles in, the tempo picks up. It's almost as if Dashner is easing the reader into what becomes fast-paced, nonstop action." Her only criticism of the book is Dashner's "fictionalized slang":

While it feels realistic and fits with his characters, it gets old pretty fast. On the plus side, however, it's used so often that the reader almost becomes desensitized and learns to ignore it.

A reviewer for The Guardian also gave the book praise, saying "I really love the characters and their varying personalities. I think James Dashner has done a really good job at having characters with all the different personalities and emotions that I think you would face in a situation such as being in the glade."

== Film adaptations ==
- The Maze Runner: Development for the film began in January 2011 when 20th Century Fox purchased the film rights to Dashner's novel series. Principal photography began in Baton Rouge, Louisiana in May 2013 and ended in July. It was released on September 19, 2014, to positive reviews.
- Maze Runner: The Scorch Trials: Principal photography commenced in Albuquerque, New Mexico in October 2014 and ended in January 2015. It was released on September 18, 2015, this time to mixed reviews.
- Maze Runner: The Death Cure: Principal photography began in South Africa in March 2017 and was released on January 26, 2018, again to mixed reviews.
