= The Fever Code =

2016 novel by James Dashner

- Book cover of The Fever Code
- Author: James Dashner
- Cover artist: Phillip Straub
- Language: English
- Series: The Maze Runner series
- Genre: Young adult, dystopian, science fiction, adventure
- Publisher: Delacorte Press
- Publication date: September 27, 2016
- Publication place: United States
- Media type: Print (hardcover and paperback), audiobook, e-book
- Pages: 347
- ISBN: 978-0-553-51309-7
- OCLC: 932001359
- LC Class: PZ7.D2587 Fe 2016
- Preceded by: The Kill Order
- Followed by: The Maze Runner (in narrative order)

The Fever Code is a 2016 young adult dystopian science fiction novel written by American author James Dashner and published on September 27, 2016, by Delacorte Press. It is the second prequel book in The Maze Runner series and the fifth installment overall. The Fever Code is the second book, chronologically, set in between the events of The Kill Order and The Maze Runner.

== Plot ==
In the prologue, soldiers from WICKED arrive to take Newt's sister, Lizzy. However, Newt and Lizzy's parents put up a fight and are killed. Since Newt and Lizzy are now orphans, WICKED takes them both with Newt as a control subject.

In the narrative's main plot, Stephen is introduced and has been renamed Thomas by the people in the organization WICKED (World in Catastrophe: Killzone Experiment Department). Killzone means the brain, the "kill zone" of the Flare. Thomas is only five years old, and since his father has a bad infection of the Flare, his mother has given him up for his safety.

He is under the care of WICKED in its main complex in the middle of an Alaskan forest. He meets Teresa, who, like him, is kept separate from the others. He has to go through blood tests and advanced classes and soon meets Dr. Paige, who acts as a parent to him, and he soon becomes her favorite. They start sneaking out and meet Newt, Minho, and Alby. Newt reveals that his sister was renamed Sonya and is part of Group B. They start exploring the complex every day. The three take Thomas and Teresa into the outside world, only to be caught by WICKED security officers and thrown into the "Crank pits" (except for Newt, who is taken to be tested for the virus since he is not immune), where they encounter the founder of WICKED, who is nearly past his sanity and writes on a chalkboard, "WICKED is good."

The five children are deeply changed by the experience. They have no secret meetings for several months, but Teresa eventually manages to hack WICKED's security systems and allow the friends to meet again. Teresa, Thomas, Aris, and Rachel are then recruited to build the Maze. At one of their meetings, Thomas and Teresa stumble upon Charles (Named after Charles Darwin), nicknamed Chuck, who becomes the little brother they never had. Their secret meetings continue, with Chuck included.

The day after, WICKED finds out that Minho tried to escape, and in front of Thomas, it unleashes a Griever on Minho to show him that anyone who tries to escape and gets caught will be harshly punished. After the horrible experience, Thomas goes back and directs all of his attention to building the Maze. Shortly afterward, the Maze is complete, which means his best and only friends will be sent into the maze first. Right before they are sent in, Thomas and Teresa go to say their goodbyes. Their friends ask them why only they are going in, not Thomas and Teresa. Not being able to answer truthfully about the Maze being his project only makes Thomas's friends more suspicious, and eventually angry. Chuck does not go with the first batch, and for a long time, he, Thomas, and Teresa remain friends.

Thomas begins to watch his friends covertly through the "Beetle blades" and sees one of the boys, George, suddenly go crazy and try to kill his friends, only to be killed by Alby. Dr. Ava Paige explains what happened to George and reveals that the Grievers have a virus similar to the Flare. She places the cure for it among the Box of supplies, but the cure is at its early stages.

A WICKED official, Randall, is found outside the complex and is infected with the Flare. Dr. Paige then summons Teresa and Thomas and reveals that she suspects other people at WICKED to have the Flare, and she sends Thomas, Teresa, Aris, and Rachel to kill those who are infected, a secret operation that Dr. Paige calls "the Purge." Before the operation begins, Thomas is somewhat reluctant and so Teresa reminds him of her past life that she once mentioned. It is then revealed that Teresa was originally the young girl Deedee, who survived in the prequel The Kill Order.

A few months after the Purge, Thomas is sent to a desert called "the Scorch" to test a Flat Trans, a teleportation device, and is introduced to Jorge and Brenda, who indirectly reveal that the Gladers must go through the Scorch as the second phase of the Trials. Thomas has come to believe that a cure will never be possible, feels that his friends are then suffering unnecessarily, and vows to save them.

Once back at base, Thomas hatches a thorough plan to escape WICKED. He begins with an idea to insert the elite candidates into the Maze with their memories intact so that they can rescue the Gladers, but Teresa seems reluctant. She takes care of suggesting the plan to Dr. Paige without telling her their true motives. Dr. Paige approves of the plan and the night before his insertion and twenty-four hours before Teresa's insertion, they spend the night in Thomas's room. They somewhat confess feelings for each other and fall asleep in each other's arms. As he prepares to be sent into the Glade, Dr. Paige gives Thomas a strange type of tea, which turns out to be anesthetics. She explains to Thomas that it was her idea to infect WICKED staff with the Flare because they wanted to end experimenting after the Maze Trials, and she wanted the experiments to continue. She then orders Thomas's memories to be wiped, despite their prior agreement. Thomas believes that Dr. Paige has betrayed him and Teresa. Thomas's emotions are then shown as he sees his memories being lost. The book ends with him standing up in the Box with his memories gone, which set the events of the main series in motion.

Another letter from Teresa shows that she knew that Thomas' memories would be erased before insertion, and that hers would not. The letter ends with Teresa stating that she believed in WICKED and would enter the Maze with the words "WICKED is good" tattooed on her arm. She said she believed that her friends would thank her one day.
