= William D. O'Connor =

American writer

William Douglas O'Connor
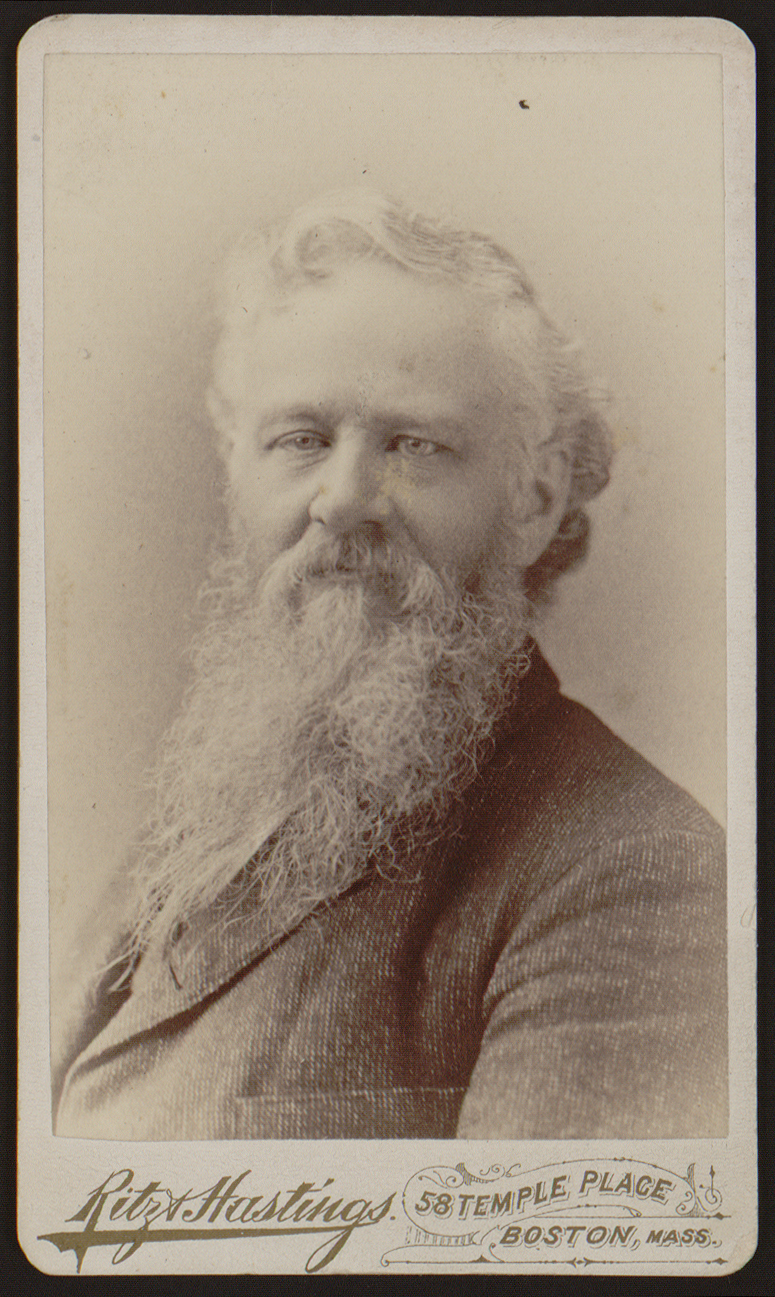
- Born: January 2, 1832; Boston, Massachusetts
- Died: May 9, 1889 (aged 57); Washington, D.C.
- Occupations: Author and friend of Walt Whitman
- Spouse: Ellen M. Tarr (m. 1856)
- Parent: Peter D. O'Connor

William Douglas O'Connor (January 2, 1832 – May 9, 1889) was an American author, known in part for his association with Walt Whitman. In 1866 he authored The Good Gray Poet, a pamphlet defending Whitman.

== Early and personal life ==
Born in Boston, Massachusetts on January 2, 1832, William O'Connor was a son of Peter D. O'Connor and an unknown mother. Little is known about his early childhood other than that he had a disagreement with his father and left the house when he was eight years old. In 1856 he married Ellen M. Tarr; the couple had two children.

== Career ==
In the 1850s he met Sarah Helen Whitman, a poet and romantic interest of Edgar Allan Poe. Whitman influenced him and O'Connor published several poems similar to Poe's work, and several stories in Putnam's Magazine and Harper's Magazine. From 1856 to 1860 he worked at The Saturday Evening Post in Philadelphia. While at the paper he wrote on the Shakespeare authorship question, proposing that Francis Bacon had written some of Shakespeare's works. As part of these efforts, O'Connor defended Delia Bacon's scholarship on the matter.

After his resignation, O'Connor published an antislavery novel, Harrington: A Story of True Love, in 1860. The same year he met Walt Whitman; the two became close friends. During the American Civil War, O'Connor worked in the United States Lighthouse Board for the United States Department of the Treasury. When Whitman came to Washington, D.C., he lived with O'Connor for several months. O'Connor helped Whitman find employment as a clerk at the Bureau of Indian Affairs. He was outraged when James Harlan fired Whitman from the Bureau in 1865 and quickly wrote a pamphlet, titled The Good Gray Poet (1866), defending Whitman and attacking Harlan. In the years that followed he wrote several other essays in defense of the poet, including "The Carpenter" (1868), which portrayed Whitman as a Christ-like figure. In 1872 the two disagreed over the Fifteenth Amendment to the United States Constitution. O'Connor supported the Amendment, which gave Black men the right to vote, while Whitman opposed it.

== Death and legacy ==
O'Connor died in Washington, D.C., on May 9, 1889. Several of his works were published posthumously in The Three Tales. Whitman wrote a preface to the book.
