= James Dashner =

American author (born 1972)

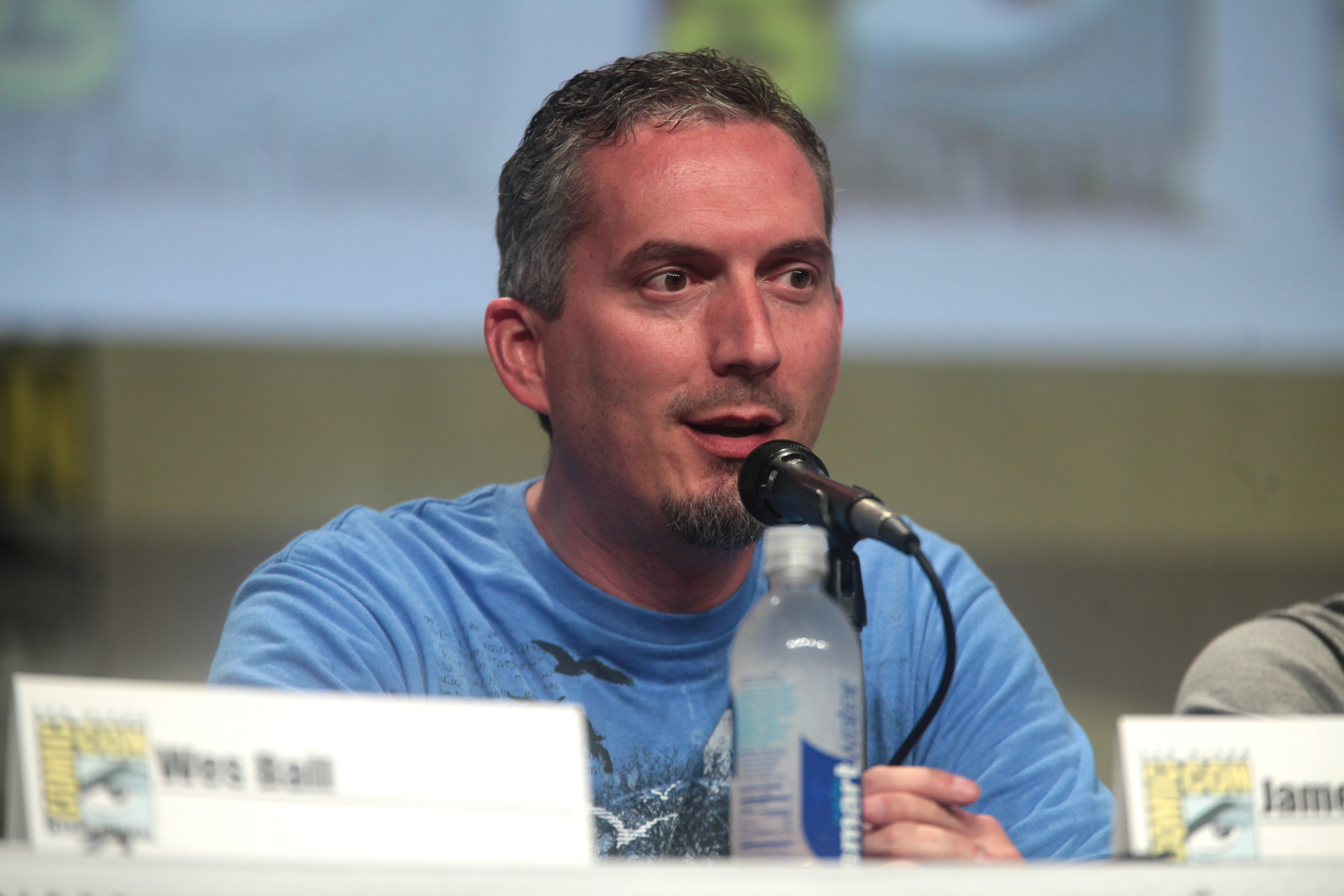
- Dashner in 2014
- Born: James Smith Dashner; November 26, 1972 (age 53); Austell, Georgia, U.S.
- Occupation: Novelist
- Spouse: Lynette
- Children: 4
- Writing career
- Period: 2003–present
- Genres: Fantasy, science fiction, children's literature
- Notable works: The 13th Reality, The Maze Runner, The Mortality Doctrine
- Website: jamesdashner.com

James Smith Dashner (born November 26, 1972) is an American writer known for speculative fiction. Many of his books are primarily aimed at children or young adults. He is best known for The Maze Runner series and the young adult fantasy series The 13th Reality. His 2008 novel The Journal of Curious Letters, the first in the series, was one of the annual Borders Original Voices picks.

In 2014, a film adaptation of The Maze Runner was released, followed by another two films in 2015 and 2018. Collectively, the three films grossed an estimated $949 million. The three films' collective box-office earnings make it the fourth-highest-grossing film series based on young-adult books, after the film series of Harry Potter, The Twilight Saga, and The Hunger Games, respectively. In 2018, Dashner was dropped by his agent and publisher following accusations of sexual harassment; Dashner replied in a statement, "I am taking any and all criticisms and accusations very seriously, and I will seek counseling and guidance to address them."

== Early life ==
James Dashner was born on November 26, 1972, in Austell, Georgia, as one of six children in the family. He was raised a member of The Church of Jesus Christ of Latter-day Saints. At the age of 10, he would type on his parents' typewriter. He graduated from Duluth High School in 1991. He moved from Atlanta, Georgia to Provo, Utah to study at Brigham Young University, where he received a master's degree in accounting.

== Career ==
Dashner released his first novel in 2003, titled A Door in the Woods. Like many of his books, A Door in the Woods is a fantasy aimed at teenagers. The story follows Jimmy Fincher, who notices a person in the forest acting suspiciously. What he witnesses then sets off a chain of events changing Jimmy's life. A Door in the Woods became part of a series of books, known as The Jimmy Fincher Saga. In 2004, a second and third book were released as part of The Jimmy Fincher Saga. The second instalment was A Gift of Ice, which again follows Jimmy in his journey to save the world from The Stompers. The third instalment of the series was released later in 2004, titled The Tower of Air. A fourth and final book, War of the Black Curtain, was published in 2005 and concluded the series.

Following the conclusion of his Jimmy Fincher Saga series, Dashner began working on two new series, which would become The 13th Reality series and The Maze Runner series. The first book of The 13th Reality, The Journal of Curious Letters, was published in 2008. The book became a highly acclaimed children's book, receiving a Whitney Award the same year. In 2009, the novel was recognized again as a Borders Original Voices pick. During 2009, Dashner released two more books: The Hunt for Dark Infinity, the second instalment in The 13th Reality series, and The Maze Runner, the first book in a series of the same name. The popularity of The Maze Runner led 20th Century Fox to obtain the rights in late 2010 for a film adaptation, with Catherine Hardwicke set to direct. The Maze Runner appeared on the New York Times Best Seller list for the first time in late 2012, in the Children's category alongside dystopian novels such as The Hunger Games and Divergent. The Maze Runner remained on the list for years, making it one of the best-selling children's books of all time.

In 2013, it was announced that The Maze Runner film had been pushed back to a September 2014 release. During the same period, it was announced that the second instalment, The Scorch Trials, had been picked up by Fox as a potential sequel to the currently unreleased first film. Dashner then released The Eye of Minds, which follows the life of Michael, a hacker employed by VirtNet. The book went onto become the first instalment of The Mortality Doctrine book series. In September 2014, The Maze Runner film adaptation was released and had a worldwide box office total of $348.3 million. Fox announced that the sequel to the first film would be released nearly a year to the date in September 2015.

A third film, The Maze Runner: The Death Cure, was set to be released in 2017. Actor Dylan O'Brien was injured on the set of the film in 2015, resulting in lengthy delays to filming while he recovered. The film was released in January 2018, and like the two previous films in the trilogy, broke $250 million in box office revenue. In July 2018, Dashner stated that he was writing a new book from scratch, the first time he had done so in 15 years.

Following the release of Maze Runner: The Death Cure, comments were posted anonymously on the School Library Journal website, alleging that Dashner had engaged in sexual harassment. Four comments claimed harassment by Dashner, and two more said that they had reported him in a Medium survey about harassment. A commenter later claimed to have been one of the accusers, and said that they "made it up". One of those commenters claimed to have been subject to "months of manipulation, grooming and gaslighting". Following this, Dashner's agent, Michael Bourret, stated that he "couldn't in good conscience continue working with [him]". Dashner published a statement on Twitter, which said, in part: "I didn't honor or fully understand boundaries and power dynamics. I can sincerely say that I have never intentionally hurt another person. But to those affected, I am so deeply sorry. I am taking any and all criticisms and accusations very seriously, and I will seek counseling and guidance to address them." Dashner's publisher, Penguin Random House, stated that it will not publish any further books by him. The accusations were part of the larger Me Too movement.

In October 2021, Dashner released the adult horror novel The House of Tongues with Riverdale Avenue Books. The storyline follows single father David Player, who is trying to raise four children while dealing and processing a childhood trauma. It follows David's recollection of events both past and present in first person. The book received mainly positive press and reviews following its release.

== Awards ==
- 2008: Whitney Award, Best Youth Fiction, The 13th Reality
- 2011: ALA Best Fiction for Young Adults, The Maze Runner
- 2012: Young Reader's Choice Award, intermediate grades, The Maze Runner

== Personal life ==
Dashner and his wife, Lynette Anderson, a former student of Brigham Young University, have four children and are now living in Utah.

== Published books ==
Dashner's books are written for young teens. His work is typically within the adventure, survival, and science-fiction genres.

The Maze Runner, his most widely distributed book, reached 100 weeks' standing on the New York Times Best Seller list for Children's Series on September 21, 2014, two days after the release of the motion picture adaptation of the book.

The Jimmy Fincher Saga

- A Door in the Woods (2003)
- A Gift of Ice (2004)
- The Tower of Air (2004)
- War of the Black Curtain (2005)

The 13th Reality series

- The Journal of Curious Letters (2008), selected as a Borders Original Voices pick
- The Hunt for Dark Infinity (2009)
- The Blade of Shattered Hope (2010)
- The Void of Mist and Thunder (2012)

The Maze Runner series

- The Maze Runner (2009)
- The Scorch Trials (2010)
- The Death Cure (2011)
- Crank Palace (novella) (2020)

The Maze Runner prequel books

- The Kill Order (2012)
- The Fever Code (2016)

The Maze Cutter series (sequel trilogy)

- The Maze Cutter (2022)
- The Godhead Complex (2023)
- The Infinite Glade (2025)

The Infinity Ring series

- A Mutiny in Time (Book 1) (2012)
- The Iron Empire (Book 7) (2014)

The Mortality Doctrine

- The Eye of Minds (2013)
- The Rule of Thoughts (2014)
- Gunner Skale (online-only short story, 2014)
- The Game of Lives (2015)

Adult/Horror

- The House of Tongues (2021)
