= Infinity Ring =

Science fiction book series by various authors

- A Mutiny in Time; Divide and Conquer; The Trap Door; Curse of the Ancients; Cave of Wonders; Behind Enemy Lines; The Iron Empire; Eternity
- Author: James Dashner; Carrie Ryan; Lisa McMann; Matt de la Peña; Matthew J. Kirby; Jennifer A. Nielsen
- Country: United States
- Language: English
- Genre: Science fiction, Adventure; Young adult
- Publisher: Scholastic
- Published: 2011–2015
- Media type: Print (hardcover and paperback)
- No. of books: 8
- Website: Official website

Infinity Ring is a series of young adult science fiction adventure novels written by multiple authors, including James Dashner, Lisa McMann, Matt de la Peña, Matthew J. Kirby, and Jennifer A. Nielsen, in a similar fashion to The 39 Clues. It is focused on the adventures of Dak Smyth, Sera Froste, and Riq Jones as they try to fix changes in time through time travel.

The series experimented with an online component; at the end of each book, a link directed the reader to a website where you could play a mini game. Each game was an "episode" in between that book and the following. There would be a short reference to the episode at the start of the following book, mentioning the location and time period they had just come from. These online episodes are no longer hosted by Scholastic and are presumed lost.

== Synopsis ==
=== A Mutiny in Time ===
A Mutiny in Time is the first book in the series. It was written by James Dashner.

To gain power and influence, a secret society known as the SQ has changed many things about time, so history is dramatically different than ours. Those changes, or "breaks," have also caused many problems, including increasingly intense natural disasters and civil unrest. The SQ also manipulates every government's actions. Dak's parents, both scientists, have developed a time machine with financing and monitoring from the Hystorians, a secret group founded by Aristotle, which works against the SQ and has been preparing to go back in time to fix the changes.

One day, Dak, Sera and their class go to the Smithsonian Museum. As Dak soaks in everything, Sera is bored with the history. Suddenly, an earthquake rocks the building, nearly causing a Viking longship to fall on Dak and Sera. After the disaster, Sera experiences a Remnant, a feeling that something different would have happened if time hadn't been changed. After she goes to Dak to share it, he allows her to enter his parents' lab. Sera completes the Infinity Ring, a device that allows time travel. However, their parents' first attempt at time traveling fails, getting them lost in the time stream. Soon after that, a dozen Hystorians disguised as SQ members storm Dak's parent's lab. When Brint and Mari, the Hystorians' current leaders, introduce Dak and Sera to the Hystorians, only Riq stands out. He is far younger than everyone else, with dark skin and eyes. He also knows sixteen languages and is 16 years old. Shortly after that, the SQ storms the compound and Dak, Sera, and Riq escape by using the Infinity Ring and decide to go back in time to fix the changes themselves.

They go to the Great Pyramid of Giza thousands of years in the past to discuss their next move. To find the first Break, or major change in time, they have to solve a riddle about "the Memory's Art". After Riq solves it, they go to Palos de la Frontera on August 3, 1492. However, they meet a Time Warden of the SQ, and have to escape and find their contact, a butcher named Gloria. They discuss the Break that they have to fix, and learn that Queen Isabella has commissioned a major voyage. The group believes that they must help the Amancio brothers – Salvador and Raul – complete a mutiny against the cruel captain Christopher Columbus. Gloria helps them get on the Santa Maria, the ship that the mutiny is about to happen on, through the help of a one-eyed man named Eyeball. The kids have to work extremely hard while on the ship. Although they still believe that the mutiny must happen, they soon discover that Raul and Salvador are SQ. The kids meet "riffraff", or the lowest of the low, including Ricardo, Francisco, and Daniel. Eyeball hears them discuss the mutiny and puts them in the brig, to be killed next morning. However, Eyeball is actually on their side, due to his love for Gloria. The riffraff expose the Amancio brothers and battle them to prevent the mutiny. However, Raul throws Dak overboard. He soon learns that Salvador is dead and Raul was thrown overboard, too. Raul tries to drown Dak, and Sera uses the Infinity Ring to warp herself, Dak, and Riq to a warehouse, where they find a wanted poster for Dak's parents. Meanwhile, Brint and Mari reflect on the SQ attack, and Brint wonders if his high school was always named after Columbus.

=== Divide and Conquer ===
Divide and Conquer, written by Carrie Ryan, is the second book in the series.

Thousands of Vikings are attacking Paris. Dak wanted to go see the Smithsonian, which nearly killed him in the previous book, when he is caught by a Viking's dog.

=== The Trap Door ===
The Trap Door is the third book in the series. It was written by Lisa McMann.

Sera, Dak, and Riq travel to 1850, but are held hostage. Riq is captured and sold as a slave.

=== Curse of the Ancients ===
Curse of the Ancients, written by Matt de la Peña, is the fourth book in the series.

Dak, Sera and Riq travel back to the time of the Mayans, where they witness the birth of the Hystorians. Dak, Sera, and Riq find themselves in the middle of a storm when they arrive there. Dak is neglected by Sera and Riq so he goes to the observatory.

=== Cave of Wonders ===
Cave of Wonders is the fifth book in the series. It was written by Matthew J. Kirby.

The book starts with Dak, Riq, and Sera, who have just completed their twelfth warp together. They have just completed their mission at the Great Wall in Ming-dynasty China. They find out that they are at Baghdad on January 27, 1258. Suddenly, they see a caravan of camels and riders heading towards the city. Dak explains how the city is on the Silk Road, a major trade route. When the group comes to the Khurasan Gate, the entrance to the city, they see that guards are collecting tolls. The trio tries to hide within the crowd to avoid paying a toll. They lie to the guards that they are traveling with their parents, who are silk traders and who are expecting them. The group enters a secret password on their SQuare and views a pre-recorded video by Brint and Mari that explains that they have to save the writings of Aristotle from the House of Wisdom, a library in the city. The writing are important in solving the Prime Break, the one that Aristotle discovered and eventually led to the establishment of the Hystorians. Without the writings, the Prime Break cannot be fixed, and new breaks will happen, leading to the Cataclysm, or the apocalypse. The group has fixed eight Breaks so far, but this scares Riq. In 1850, he messed up his family tree, which meant that he could cease to exist in the present. The group tries to find the local Hystorian and get new clothes to blend in, but overhears that the Mongols, lead to Hulagu, are only a few days from the city. However, Dak, attempting to earn some money to purchase new clothes, tells a story about a time-traveling djinn to the citizens of the city. The Market Inspector attempts to seize their money, but they escape due to a rug merchant called Farid. Finally, they find the House of Wisdom, which overlooks the Tigris River. They find their Hystorian contact, named Abi, and discuss the Break. The Mongols will sack Baghdad in two days, essentially turning it into a ghost town for hundreds of years. They also talk about Tusi, a scholar who Hulagu captured and took as his advisor.

The next day, the four head to the caliph to convince him to surrender, or at least let them talk to Tusi about the House of Wisdom. However, when they talk to him, he refuses to save the House and raises suspicions that he is SQ. Dak, Riq, and Sera head to the Mongol war camp instead to try to talk to Hulagu. However, Riq and Dak are captured, and Sera still cannot convince Tusi to save the writings. Riq and Dak are taken to General Guo Kan, the Divine Man, who is SQ. The grand vizier and Market Inspector are also SQ. When Kan leaves, Riq and Dak escape, and reunite with Sera. They use a boat to travel up the Tigris River and into Baghdad. However, they are promptly arrested, and discover that Abi was also arrested. The group escapes from prison by using one of Dak's ideas. Riq and Abi go to get the Infinity Ring back from the grand vizier, while Dak and Sera try to prevent Baghdad's libraries from falling. The animals in the caliph's menagerie have fled, and Riq and Abi struggle to escape a black bear. Riq dislocates his shoulder in the escape, and almost blacks out from the pain. However, Abi helps him. Next, they see an enormous tiger, and set a trap for the vizier. This results in the vizier hanging on to a tapestry with a tiger below him. After the vizier hands over the Ring, and the pair saves him, he tries to steal it again. However, this time he is eaten alive by the tiger when he falls. Meanwhile, Sera tells Dak about seeing the Cataclysm. After they meet Farid, who had been visited by Dak's parents, the group rests up and waits for the siege of Baghdad to end.

They sneak into Hulagu's palace, which is being prepared on the eastern side of the city. They convince Tusi to help them, Tusi convinces Hulagu that an observatory must be built, with a library full of Baghdad's books. When Guo Kan opposes this, he is promptly detained. Back at the House of Wisdom, Riq tells Abi how he messed up his own timeline and may not exist in the present day. However, Abi says that Riq is real to him, and praises how noble he is. When Dak, Sera, and Tusi meet up with them, the Market Inspector and his guards begin to torch the House of Wisdom. However, they manage to save at least the writings of Aristotle. After saying good-bye, Riq, Sera, and Dak warp to their next mission. They find out that they are at St. Louis, on the banks of the Mississippi River, in the summer of 1804. However, the SQ has tampered and killed everyone on the Lewis and Clark Expedition, which left from Camp Wood (near the city), and prevented settlement of the Louisiana Purchase. They discover that the SQ has control over St. Louis.

=== Behind Enemy Lines ===
Behind Enemy Lines, written by Jennifer A. Nielsen, is the sixth book in the series.

Sera, Dak, and Riq travel to 1943 and decide to spy on both Allied and Axis troops to try to tip the balance of the war in the Allies' favor.

=== The Iron Empire ===
The Iron Empire is the seventh book in the series. It was originally planned to be the final book, but the Hystorian's Guide that came with the book included a notice about the eighth book, Eternity. The Iron Empire was also written by James Dashner.

Finally, Dak, Sera, and Riq go back to the time of the first break in history: the assassination of Alexander the Great and Philip II of Macedon. While they think they have three weeks to fix it, the SQ has made sure that they don't.

=== Eternity ===
Eternity, by Matt de la Peña, is the eighth and final book in the series. Dak, Sera, and Riq have fixed the Great Breaks in history, but the SQ isn't beaten yet.

== Reception ==
The first book, A Mutiny in Time, received a favorable review from Rick Riordan in the New York Times, who praised its "tight plotting, snappy dialogue and...judicious balance of humor and suspense." io9 expressed excitement and hope that the series would cause more middle school aged kids to become interested in science fiction.

== Supplementary works ==
Similar to what the 39 Clues series did with Rapid Fire, the Infinity Ring series released seven short ebooks, called Infinity Ring: Secrets. The titles of the stories are:

- Shipwrecked
- Ashes to Ashes
- On Thin Ice
- Blood and Ink
- Entombed
- Up In Flames
- Unchained
