= Matthew J. Kirby =

American writer

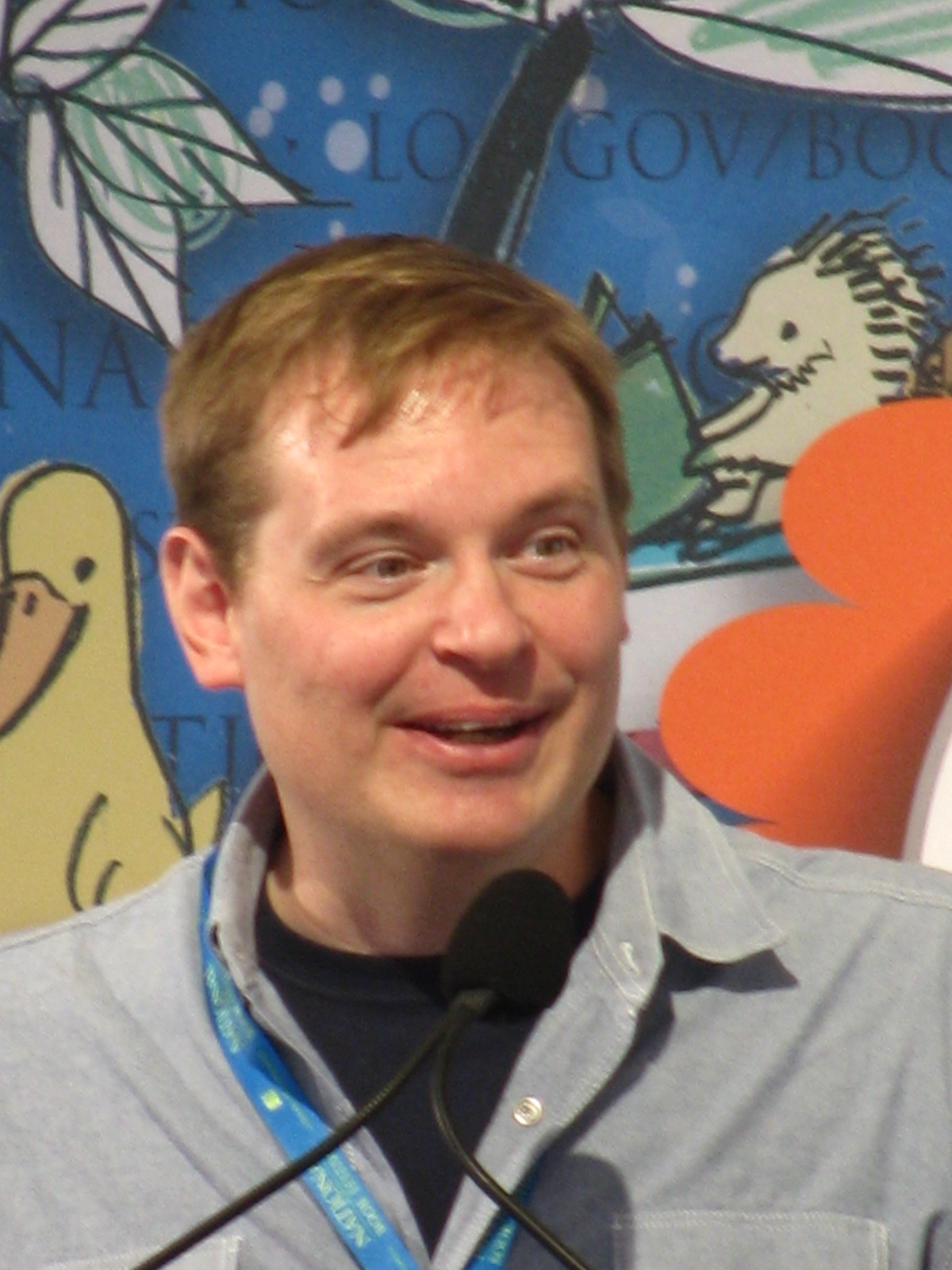
- Born: Utah, United States
- Occupation: Young adult fiction author
- Writing career
- Notable awards: Edgar Award; 2012 Best Juvenile Mystery

Matthew J. Kirby is an American author of middle grade and young adult children's books.

== Life ==
Kirby was born in Utah. As the son of a naval officer, he had the opportunity to live in various parts of the country, including Maryland, California, and Hawaii. As a pre-teen, he was given a set of Ursula K. Le Guin's Earthsea books. As he read a particular passage, he was struck by her use of language and knew he wanted to become a writer. He earned his bachelor's degree in history at Utah State University and went on to earn his master's degree in school counselling. His early writing endeavors were more tailored to adults in the form of poetry and short fiction, but he eventually settled into writing for young people as he discovered many of his ideas were more "suited for a younger audience."

In 2010, his first book, The Clockwork Three, was published by Scholastic Press. It was a children's historical fantasy set in a fictional American city in the late 19th century. His second book, Icefall, about a Viking princess, won the 2012 Edgar Award for Juvenile Fiction.

He currently lives in Idaho with his wife Jaime.

== Works ==
=== Novels ===
- The Clockwork Three (2010)
- Icefall (2011)
- Infinity Ring: Book 5: Cave of Wonders (2013)
- The Lost Kingdom (2013)
- The Quantum League: Spell Robbers (2014)
- The Dark Gravity Sequence, Book 1: The Arctic Code (2015)
- The Dark Gravity Sequence, Book 2: Island of the Sun (2016)
- The Dark Gravity Sequence, Book 3: The Rogue World (2017)
- Last Descendants (September 2016)
- A Taste For Monsters (September 2016)
- Last Descendants, Book 2: Tomb of the Khan (2016)
- Last Descendants; Book 3: Fate of the Gods (2017)
- Assassin's Creed Valhalla: Geirmund's Saga (2020)
- Star Splitter (2023)

=== Poetry ===
- "In Their Element" (as M.J. Kirby) (2005)

=== Short fiction ===
- "Letters on Natural Magic" (2007)
