= The Maze Runner =

2009 novel by James Dashner

- 2009 edition cover
- Author: James Dashner
- Cover artist: Philip Straub
- Language: English
- Series: The Maze Runner series
- Genre: Young adult, science fiction, post-apocalyptic
- Published: October 6, 2009
- Publisher: Delacorte Press
- Publication place: United States
- Media type: Print (hardcover and paperback), audiobook, e-book
- Pages: 375 pp.
- ISBN: 978-0-385-73794-4 (first edition, hardcover)
- OCLC: 299381315
- LC Class: PZ7.D2587Maz 2009
- Preceded by: The Fever Code (in narrative order)
- Followed by: The Scorch Trials

The Maze Runner is a 2009 dystopian novel by American author James Dashner. It takes place in a world suffering from a coronal mass ejection and whose surviving civilians fight to avoid an apocalyptic illness called the Flare. It is written from the perspective of Thomas, a 16-year-old boy who wakes up with no memories inside an artificially produced maze. An organization called WICKED controls the world politically, seeks a cure to the Flare, and uses the youngest generation of civilians who are immune to it as test subjects.

The book received critical acclaim from major reviewers and authors. It won the Young Adult Library Services Association Best Fiction for Young Adults award in 2011, is a #1 New York Times Best Seller and was on the list for 148 weeks, and was a Kirkus Reviews Teen Book of the Year. The Maze Runner is a popular pick by educators teaching middle-grade readers in schools.

The novel was published in 2009 by Delacorte Press, an imprint of Penguin Random House with cover art by Philip Straub. The Maze Runner is the first novel in The Maze Runner series, followed by The Scorch Trials (2010) and The Death Cure (2011). A film adaptation, directed by Wes Ball, was released in 2014 by 20th Century Fox and stars Dylan O’Brien as Thomas.

== Plot ==
A boy named Thomas wakes up in a metal elevator that brings him to a place called the Glade. He has no memory of how he got there or who he is aside from his name. He gradually discovers that the Glade is run by two boys: Alby, the leader, and Newt, his second-in-command, who maintain order by enforcing simple rules. The elevator box surfaces from under the ground once every week and brings supplies of food, tools, clothes, medicine, and sometimes weapons. Every month, a new boy with no memory of anything but his first name also appears in the box. The box has never sent up a girl so it is not known if they are all gone or not.

The Glade is enclosed by concrete walls several hundred feet high. The walls have openings in them which slide shut every night. Outside the walls is the Maze, a labyrinth made of high concrete walls covered in ivy that change configuration every night. The Maze houses strange, lethal creatures of metal and flesh known as Grievers. The group of boys, who call themselves Gladers, try to stay alive as well as to solve the Maze by appointing "Runners" to run through it as fast as they can while tracking the movements of the walls and trying to find an exit.

One day, after Thomas' arrival, a girl named Teresa is delivered through the elevator into the Glade. She is the first girl to arrive at the Glade and is clutching a note that says, "She's the last one. Ever." She says Thomas' name at one point during a week-long coma. Later that day a boy named Ben, who was stung by a Griever and went through the "Changing", tries to kill Thomas. Alby saves Thomas and Ben is banished into the maze.

Minho, the Keeper of the Runners, goes into the Maze with Alby to see what they think might be the first dead Griever. Alby is stung by the creature and attacks Minho, who knocks Alby out. Minho carries Alby back to the Glade but by the time they arrive, the doors to the Glade are already closing. Thomas runs into the maze to help, becoming stranded with Minho and Alby. When they hear the sounds of Grievers approaching, Minho runs away, knowing they don't have a chance of survival, while Thomas uses the ivy on the maze walls to pull Alby up. Minho later comes back to help Thomas, and by morning they have killed four of the Grievers by leading them off a cliff.

After returning to the Glade the next morning, Newt calls a Gathering of the Keepers to discuss what to do with Thomas. Some of the Keepers vote to grant him clemency, but others, specifically Gally, vote to lock him up as a punishment. Minho nominates Thomas to become the Keeper of the Runners, but Gally disagrees with this. Gally and Minho threaten each other, and the discussion ends with Gally storming off. Newt, as interim head of the Gathering due to Alby's condition, proposes sending Thomas to the Slammer (their version of prison) for a day, and then having him start training to become a Runner. Without an official vote, the Keepers decide to go with Newt's plan.

Alby asks to see Thomas alone and tries to tell him something he has seen during the Changing that had to do with Thomas. Before he can give Thomas any real information, Alby starts trying to choke himself. With Newt's help, Thomas manages to stop him. Alby then says that someone was controlling his actions.

Teresa wakes from her coma, and tells Thomas telepathically that she triggered the Ending. The food is running low, the sky is permanently gray, the box is not coming up, and at night the Maze doors stay open. Alby decides that he'll go into the Map Room and analyze the maps to see if he can find any patterns. Gally comes back that night and says that the Grievers will come every night now, killing them all off one by one. When the Grievers enter the Homestead, where the Gladers have been hiding, Gally throws himself at them and they leave.

The next morning, they find out that Alby has tried to burn all the maps. Thomas later discovers that Minho and Newt secured the maps in the Weapons Room a couple of hours earlier, saving them. Thomas gets the idea to compare each map to the maps of other sections as opposed to with other days, and, after copying a few maps onto wax paper and layering them by day, they find that the first combination spells FLOATCAT. After copying more maps and layering them, they find that the complete code spelled out by the Maze is: "FLOAT CATCH BLEED DEATH STIFF PUSH".

During the following nights, the Grievers come back and take one Glader per night.

Realizing that they need to get their memories back, Thomas voluntarily gets stung by a Griever and spends a couple of days unconscious as he goes through the Changing. When he wakes up, he knows they have to go down the Griever Hole to escape the Maze and insert the code into a machine they will find. He also remembers part of the world they came from, including about WICKED (World in Catastrophe: Killzone Experiment Department) and his own participation in the creation of the Maze.

Using this new information, most of the Gladers leave to try to jump down the Griever Hole. Almost half of them die in the fight against the Grievers, but Thomas and Teresa manage to insert the code, with help from Chuck to realize that "PUSH" means to push a button instead of being the last word of the code.

After exploring the facility, the remaining Gladers find themselves in a room with scientists watching them. One of the scientists walks out, accompanied by Gally. Gally throws a knife at Thomas, but Chuck dives in front of him, sacrificing himself for Thomas.

A rescue team comes crashing in seconds later, killing all the scientists and taking the Gladers with them to another facility, where they have dinner and go to sleep.

== Characters ==
Thomas
The protagonist of the novel. The only thing he can remember when he comes into the Glade is his name, a common pattern amongst the Gladers. Chuck describes him as about 16 years old, of average height, and brown-haired. He is called "Greenie", a nickname given to new arrivals. He becomes a Runner with Minho after he and Minho are the first to spend the night in the Maze without dying, and saves Alby when he is about to die.
Teresa
One of the main characters. The first girl and last person to enter the Glade. When she enters the Glade she is in a coma. She calls Thomas "Tom". She helps Thomas get out of the maze and fight the Grievers in the Griever Hole. She is thin and has black hair, blue eyes, and relatively pale skin.
Alby
The eldest and the leader of the Gladers. He is described as a "dark-skinned boy with short-cropped hair, his face clean-shaven." He tries to keep order within the group and keep them all alive by having all the boys follow rules. He has a close relationship with Newt, his second-in-command. He was in the group of 30 who first arrived in the Glade. Alby commits suicide by walking into a group of Grievers, thinking that he should die there rather than outside the Maze.
Newt
One of the main characters. He is good friends with Thomas and Minho. He used to be a Runner but retired after an incident that broke his leg, causing him to limp. He says it was from running from a Griever, but it is revealed in The Death Cure to have been from attempting suicide by jumping from a maze wall. Because of the less-than-perfect conditions of the Glade, his leg never healed properly, causing him to stay in the Glade. He is kind, friendly, and welcoming to Thomas. He is Alby's closest friend and second-in-command and takes over as leader when Alby is no longer capable. Newt is described as being "tall and muscular," with blond hair that comes down over his shoulders and a square jaw. Newt is older than Thomas.
Minho
One of the main characters. He is the Keeper of the Runners and is in charge of navigating and mapping out the Maze. As a Runner, he is in very good shape and is described as "an Asian kid with strong, heavily muscled arms and short black hair." He is sarcastic and a jokester. He tends to react without thinking, which leads him into trouble. He and Thomas quickly become good friends.
Chuck
A young and chubby boy with curly hair who was the newest Glader until Thomas arrived. He immediately becomes friends with Thomas and acts like a little brother with him. Chuck is a "Slopper", one of the Gladers who handle the distasteful jobs the others do not want. He is around 13 years old. He is killed by Gally after the latter throws a dagger at Thomas and Chuck saves him.
Gally
The main antagonist. Gally is a Glader who lives by the rules Alby put in place. He does not trust Thomas and shows an immense dislike for him. He is the Keeper of the Builders. He runs away from the Glade in a fit of rage after an argument at the Gathering about Thomas. At the end of the book, he throws a dagger at Thomas and ends up killing Chuck when the latter throws himself in front of it.
Ben
A Builder. After undergoing the Changing and attempting to kill Thomas, he is banished to the Maze and dies overnight.
Ava Paige
The chancellor of WICKED and the person responsible for sending teenagers into the Maze. She appears in the epilogue in an e-mail.
Grievers
Biomechanical creatures that hunt and kill the Gladers in the maze. They are described as "large, bulbous creature[s] the size of a cow but with no distinct shape." In the Ending, they are let into the Glade to kill one person every day.

== Development ==
In November 2005, Dashner had an idea for a book "about a bunch of teenagers living inside an unsolvable Maze full of hideous creatures, in the future, in a dark, dystopian world. It would be an experiment, to study their minds. Terrible things would be done to them – awful things; completely hopeless – until the victims turn everything on its head." During his writing process, he envisioned the novels as movies. One of the influences for the book was Lord of the Flies. Dashner wrote The Maze Runner from December 2005 to March 2006 and it was published in 2009.

== Reception ==
Kirkus Reviews wrote of The Maze Runner: "Hard to put down, this is clearly just a first installment, and it will leave readers dying to find out what comes next." Jessica Harrison of the Deseret Morning News labeled The Maze Runner as "a thrilling adventurous book for kids ages 13+ that will get readers' hearts pumping and leave them asking for more," though she noted the "fictionalized slang" as a drawback.

The novel won the 2011 Best Fiction for Young Adults Award presented by the Young Adult Library Services Association. It won the Charlotte Award in 2012, an award given to outstanding literature for children as voted on by students in New York State. It also won the Lincoln Award in 2012, an award sponsored by the Illinois School Library Educators for literature encouraging high school readers to read for personal enjoyment. The Maze Runner won the Truman Readers Award in 2012, an award for literature which encourages young readers between the sixth and eighth grades. The book also received the Evergreen Teen Book Award in 2012 and Georgia Peach Book Award in 2009. It was nominated for the Utah Book Award for Young Adults in 2009 and the Pennsylvania Young Readers’ Choice Award in 2011.

Christy Goldsmith of the University of Missouri noted that she used The Maze Runner in her secondary classroom to teach independent reading, how to interact with fiction, and that “reading doesn’t have to be painful.” In the Journal of Adolescent & Adult Literacy, Sara Abrams of Arizona State University recommended The Maze Runner to middle school students, writing, "readers who seek adventure and are curious about living on their own will find The Maze Runner an engaging read” and comparing it to Lord of the Flies. Sandra Bennet wrote in The School Librarian that the book is "an absorbing and tense novel which mid to older teens will devour."

== Film adaptation ==
20th Century Fox released a film adaptation of the book titled The Maze Runner on September 19, 2014. Wes Ball directed and T. S. Nowlin wrote the screenplay. Dylan O'Brien played the lead role of Thomas, Thomas Brodie-Sangster portrayed Newt, and Kaya Scodelario portrayed Teresa. Ki Hong Lee, Blake Cooper, Will Poulter, and Aml Ameen were added to the cast as Minho, Chuck, Gally, and Alby, respectively. Patricia Clarkson played Ava Paige. Dexter Darden portrayed Frypan, Alexander Flores portrayed Winston, Jacob Latimore played Jeff, Randal Cunningham portrayed Clint, Chris Sheffield portrayed Ben, and Joe Adler played Zart.

Wayne Haag served as a concept artist for the film, and Ellen Goldsmith-Vein as a producer. Creature designer Ken Barthelmey designed the Grievers for the film. Filming started in May of 2013, and ended in July of the same year.

Following the acquisition of 21st Century Fox by Disney in March 2019, Disney confirmed in April 2019 at their CinemaCon presentation that new Maze Runner films were in development.

In May 2024, it was announced that a reboot was in development, with Wes Ball returning as a producer and Jack Paglen hired as writer. The new installment was described as "not a redo of the story nor [...] a direct sequel to the original trilogy" but "a sort of continuation [...] yet also return to the elements that made the first movie connect with its audience."
