= Jim Loach =

British film director

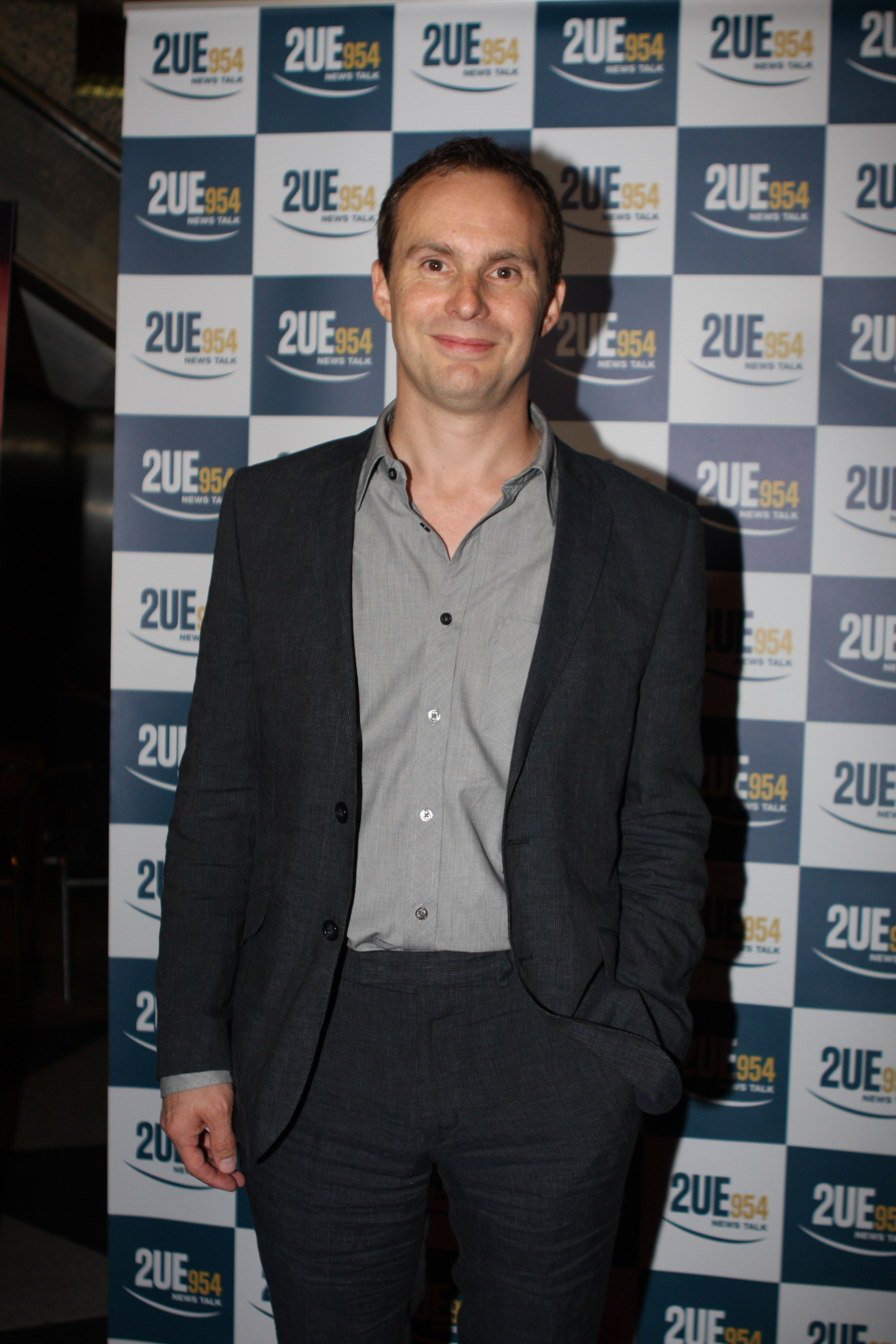
- Loach at the Sydney premiere of Oranges and Sunshine in May 2011
- Born: 1970 or 1971; England
- Occupations: Film and television director
- Years active: 1996–present
- Known for: Oranges and Sunshine (2011)
- Children: 2
- Father: Ken Loach

James Loach (born 1970 or 1971) is a British film director. He is known for his feature films Oranges and Sunshine (2011) and Measure of a Man (2018). He also has numerous TV directing credits, including the 2024 Apple TV+ series Criminal Record, starring Peter Capaldi and Cush Jumbo. He is the son of filmmaker Ken Loach.

== Early life and education ==
Jim Loach was born in 1970 or 1971 to filmmaker Ken Loach and dancer Lesley Ashton, one of five children. He grew up in London and Bath, Somerset. One brother died in a road accident at the age of six.

He studied philosophy at University College London.

== Career ==
=== Early career ===
Loach intended to pursue a career in journalism. He joined the BBC where he worked as a researcher for Sue Lawley and Anne Robinson. He turned to directing in 1996 while working on the Granada TV current affairs programme World in Action.

=== TV ===
He went on to direct several episodes of Coronation Street in 2000, and subsequently directed episodes of Bad Girls, Waterloo Road, Shameless and Hotel Babylon.

In 2012, Loach directed Life of Crime, a thriller written by Declan Croghan. It centred on a young police officer's obsession with the killer of a young girl. Hayley Atwell played the lead part, supported by Richard Coyle and Con O'Neill. It transmitted on ITV to positive reviews in May 2013.

In 2019, Loach directed Save Me Too, the sequel to Save Me, written by and starring Lennie James. The series transmitted to very positive reviews in April 2020 in the UK on Sky Atlantic, and later on Peacock (streaming service) in the United States.

In 2024, Loach directed Criminal Record starring Peter Capaldi and Cush Jumbo for Apple TV+ which attracted very positive notices. He followed this quickly with Lockerbie: A Search for Truth starring Colin Firth as Jim Swire, who has dedicated his life to uncovering the truth of the bombing of Pan Am 103 above Lockerbie, Scotland in 1988.

=== Film ===
His first feature film Oranges and Sunshine was released on 1 April 2011. The film starred Emily Watson as Margaret Humphreys, the social worker who exposed the scandal of child migration. It co-starred Hugo Weaving and David Wenham.

In June 2015, Loach started production on his second film, Measure of a Man. Based on the coming-of-age novel One Fat Summer by Robert Lipsyte, the screenplay was written by David Scearce. The cast included Donald Sutherland, Judy Greer, Luke Wilson and Blake Cooper. The film was released in 2018.

== Recognition and awards ==
2021: Co-winner, BAFTA for Best TV Drama Series, for Save Me Too

== Filmography ==
Feature films
Year	Title	Distributor
2018	Measure of a Man	Lionsgate
2011	Oranges and Sunshine	Icon Film Distribution

Television
Year	Title	Broadcaster
2026	Unchosen	Netflix
2025	Lockerbie: A Search for Truth	Sky Atlantic
2024	Criminal Record	Apple TV+
2021	The Tower	Independent Television/ITV/Britbox
2020	Save Me Too	Sky Atlantic/NBC Universal
2019	Deep Water	Independent Television/ITV
2019	Tin Star	Sky Atlantic/Amazon
2017	Victoria	Independent Television/ITV/PBS Masterpiece
2017	Endeavour	Independent Television/ITV
2013	Life of Crime	Independent Television/ITV
2012	DCI Banks	Independent Television/ITV
2012	The Hidden Side of Sport	BBC
2009	Hotel Babylon	BBC
2008	Shameless	Channel Four
2008	HolbyBlue	BBC
2006	Waterloo Road	BBC
2005	Bad Girls	ITV
2004	Footballers Wives	ITV
2003	Sweet Medicine	ITV
2000	Coronation Street	ITV
