= Sarah Webster Fabio =

American poet

Sarah Webster Fabio (January 20, 1928 – November 7, 1979) was an American poet, literary critic and educator.

== Early life and education ==
Sarah Webster was born in Nashville, Tennessee to Thomas Webster and Mayme Louise Storey Webster.

Showing an interest in poetry, she began writing as a high school student. After graduating from high school at 15, Webster was accepted to Spelman College, where she majored in English and history. In 1945, she returned to Nashville, Tennessee where she graduated from Fisk University. There, she studied poetry under Arna Bontemps. She then married Cyril Fabio, a dental student who later graduated from the historically Black Meharry Medical College. She then changed her surname to Fabio.

Upon her husband's graduation from dental school, he enlisted in the military, which greatly delayed Fabio's graduate education. She had three children (born 1947, 1948, and in 1949) while her husband was stationed in various locations across the U.S. When they were stationed in Nashville, Fabio enrolled in graduate school at the Tennessee Agricultural and Industrial College. When her husband was deployed to Germany, Fabio's studies were delayed yet again. During her time in Germany she had another child, born in 1954, her fourth and finally, when they moved back to the Wichita, Kansas US the fifth child, born in 1956. While in Kansas, she took graduate English classes at Wichita State University.

== Bay Area higher education and the Black Arts Movement ==
In 1963, Fabio attended San Francisco State College, where she earned her master's degree in Language Arts (with a focus on poetry). She graduated in 1965, on the same day her eldest graduated from high school. From 1965 to 1968 she taught at Merritt College in Oakland, California. Merritt College was known as a center of Black activist activity during the Civil Rights era. Students at the time included Maulana Karenga, Bobby Seale and Huey Newton.

Fabio is credited with helping to introduce the Black Arts Movement to Bay Area colleges. Following her tenure at Merritt College, she held positions at California College of Arts and Crafts and the University of California, Berkeley between 1968 and 1971. At both of those institutions she is credited with helping to establish the first Black studies departments.

== Poetry ==
Fabio's time at Merritt College enabled Fabio to expand upon her poetry, combining western styles with Black narrative and realism. She read her poetry at the First World Festival of Negro Art in Dakar, Senegal, in 1966. She wrote several collections including poetry and prose. Fabio also performed poetic recordings (published as four albums in 1972 on Folkways Records). Her records, and the entire Folkways collection, are found in the Smithsonian Folkways collection online. She published an anthology in 1966. Her seven-volume series Rainbow Signs is considered one of her most impressive works.

In 2023, Fabio received a PEN Oakland/Reginald Lockett Lifetime Achievement Award for her jazz poetry albums on Folkways Records.

== Notable written works ==
- Saga of a Black Man (1968)
- Mirror, a Soul (1969)
- Black Talk: Shield and Sword (1973)
- Dark Debut: Three Black Women Coming (1966)
- Return of Margaret Walker (1966)
- Double Dozens: An Anthology of Poets from Sterling Brown to Kali (1966)
- No Crystal Stair: A Socio-Drama of the History of Black Women in the U.S.A. (1967)
- Rainbow Signs (1973) the Seven Volume Series of poetry books (Black Back, Back Black; Boss Soul; My Own Thing; JuJus and Jubilees; Together to the Tune of Coltrane; Soul Aint Soul is; and JuJus: Alchemy of the Blues)

== Later life and death ==
Fabio divorced her husband in 1972. She then accepted a faculty position at Oberlin College until 1974. While pursuing her PhD in American and African Studies at the University of Iowa in 1976 and whilst teaching at the University of Wisconsin she was diagnosed with colon cancer. Fabio spent her last two years with her oldest daughter born in 1949, and died at the age of 51 on November 7, 1979.

== Legacy ==
Cheryl Fabio, Fabio's daughter, produced the documentary film of Fabio's life and work Rainbow Black: Poet Sarah W. Fabio as her MA thesis in communications at Stanford University in 1976. In 2012, The Black Film Center at Indiana University was awarded a preservation grant from the National Film Preservation Foundation to remaster and preserve the film.

== See also ==
- The Nigger Bible, book by Robert H. deCoy, which inspired Fabio's poem "Black Is"
