= Tanner Buchanan =

American actor (born 1998)

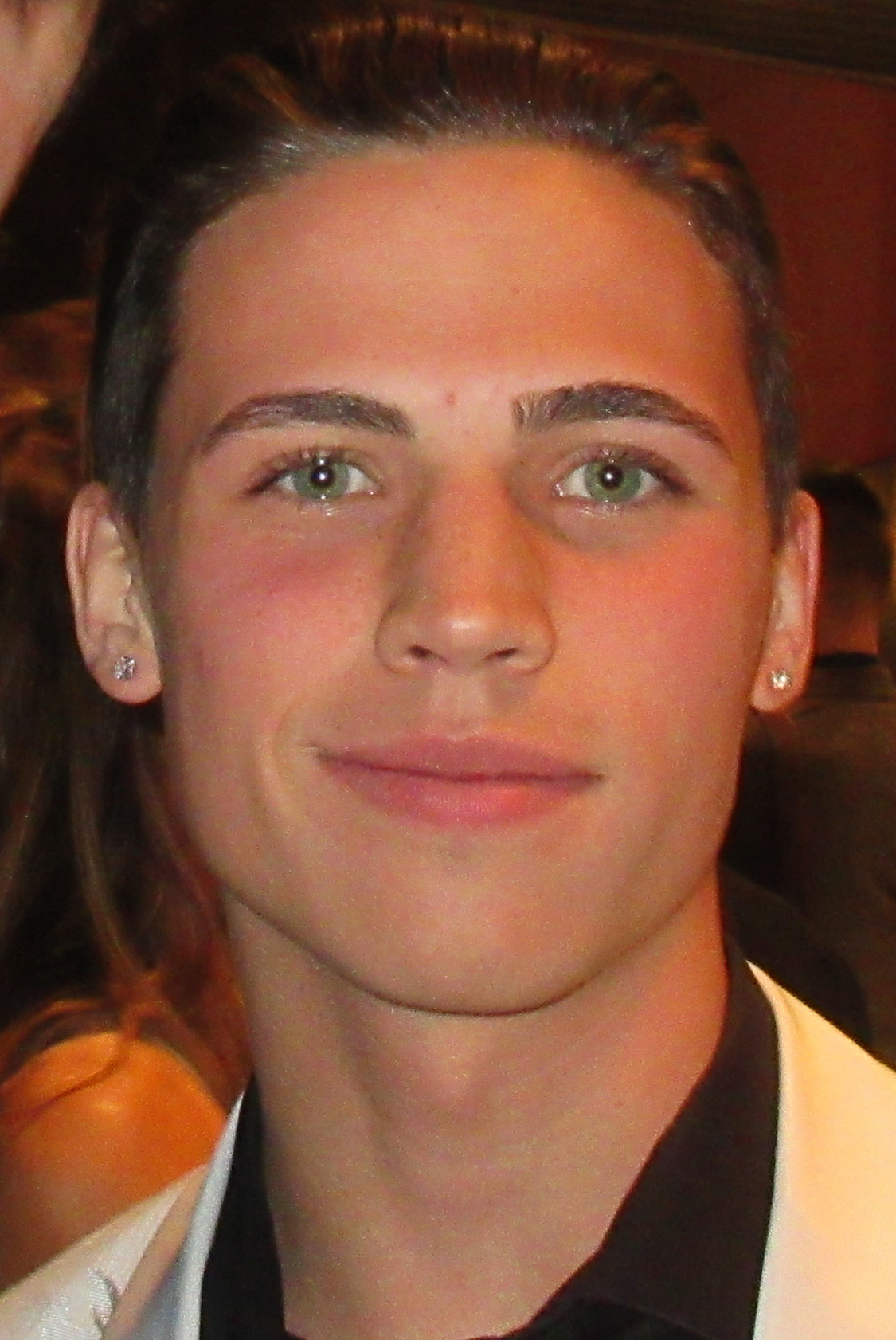
- Buchanan in 2018
- Born: Tanner Emmanuel Buchanan; December 8, 1998 (age 27); Lima, Ohio, U.S.
- Occupation: Actor
- Years active: 2009–present
- Partner: Mary Mouser

Tanner Emmanuel Cristobal Buchanan (born December 8, 1998) is an American actor. He is best known for his roles as Leo Kirkman in the political conspiracy drama series Designated Survivor (2016–2018) and Robby Keene in the martial arts action series Cobra Kai (2018–2025).

== Early life ==
Buchanan was born in Lima, Ohio, on December 8, 1998. His parents are Steve and Marlona Buchanan, both industrial engineers. His maternal grandfather was Filipino while his paternal grandparents are of Scottish ancestry.

He was raised in a Christian household, and he attended Glandorf Elementary School in Ohio. Since he was very young, he has excelled in the sport of skateboarding.

Buchanan practiced taekwondo throughout his childhood. He was introduced to the world of karate at a very early age by his mother, who is a black belt in martial arts.

He is also an expert dancer since he was five years old, winning national tap dance tournaments throughout his childhood and adolescence. He trained at the dance academy "Center Stage Dance Academy" in Ottawa, Ohio.

At the age of eight, he moved with his family to Los Angeles to pursue an acting career, beginning his acting training at the "Edge Performing Arts Centre (PAC)" and at "Huckleberry Friend Productions, Inc." owned by acting coach David Kaufman.

== Acting career ==
=== 2010–2017: Early work and breakthrough ===
In 2010, he began his acting career, making his television debut with a child role on the series Modern Family. He has since participated in television in the TV shows Grey's Anatomy, Major Crimes, The Goldbergs, and Deputy. He was cast in the 2011 film Untitled Jeff and Jackie Filgo Project playing the lead role, but the pilot was not purchased so the project did not go forward. In 2013, he made his film debut with the comedy Jake Squared directed by Howard Goldberg.

Buchanan played Charlie Gardner in the Disney Channel series Girl Meets World and Mason Kendall in the Nickelodeon series Game Shakers in 2015.

In 2016, he played Leo Kirkman, son of the President of the United States, Thomas Kirkman, in the political conspiracy series Designated Survivor and Jack Downey in the family drama series The Fosters.

He made a special participation as the young dancer Chad Brad Bradley in the 2017 series Fuller House produced by Warner Bros.

=== 2018–present: Cobra Kai and worldwide recognition ===
In 2018, he began portraying Johnny Lawrence's estranged son, Robby Keene in the Netflix martial arts series, Cobra Kai, a sequel to The Karate Kid films created by Robert Mark Kamen.

Buchanan co-starred with Chad Michael Murray in the science-fiction film Max Winslow and the House of Secrets in 2019. On the same year, he starred as Dylan Warren in Damián Romay's thriller and suspense film Sinister Seduction opposite Kristina Klebe. He co-starred with Blake Cooper in the biographical film Chance directed by John B. Crye, which was released on May 22, 2020, at the Starlite Drive in Amelia, Ohio.

In 2021, Buchanan starred in the remake of She's All That called He's All That with Addison Rae, in which he played the lead role of Cameron Kweller. That same year he also narrated the audio version of F. Scott Fitzgerald's novel The Great Gatsby for Blackstone Publishing. In 2022, he starred in the superhero action-comedy film The Hyperions as Apollo, directed by Jon McDonald. He starred alongside Sebastian Croft and Charithra Chandran in the British teen romantic comedy film How to Date Billy Walsh, directed by Alex Sanjiv Pillai, which was released on Amazon Prime Video on April 5, 2024.

He voiced Prince Arluu in the animated anthology series Star Wars: Visions created by Disney+ and produced by Lucasfilm in 2025.

== Other artistic disciplines ==
=== Martial arts ===
Buchanan is a martial arts specialist. He is a karateka black belt in shotokan karate-do. While filming Designated Survivor in Toronto, Canada, Buchanan trained in Muay Thai for about eight months before being cast in Cobra Kai. He shared a workout routine on Men's Health that included barbell jumping jacks to get in fighting shape. Buchanan inherited kali sticks from his maternal grandfather, who was originally from Southeast Asia, which he considers essential elements for his life when practicing eskrima, the ancestral Filipino martial art.

=== Dance ===
Buchanan has training in five types of dance: traditional or folk, classical or ballet, modern, contemporary, and urban. He excels professionally in percussion technique, winning multiple awards in tap and jazz competitions.

=== Music ===
Buchanan has musical training and is a skilled pianist and guitarist. He was part of the progressive death metal band "Acidosis" being the lead guitarist using the electric guitar. He debuted as a singer with the song "Fall Into my Arms" which was featured on the soundtrack to his film Max Winslow and the House of Secrets.

== Personal life ==
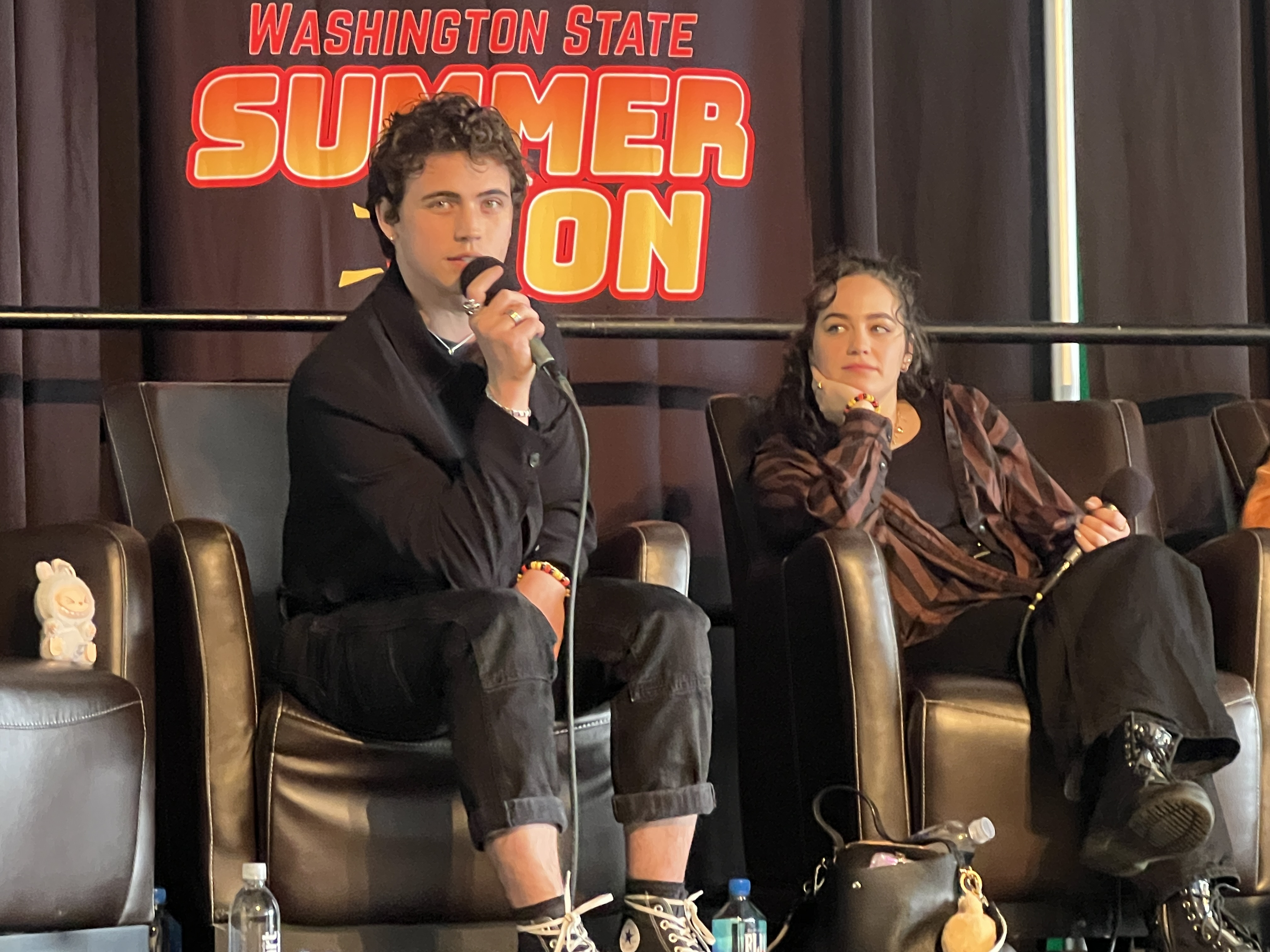
Buchanan and Mary Mouser at a convention in Washington state on June 22, 2025

Buchanan is an amateur in the practice of magic and photography. He has participated in various charitable works, including the construction of homes for the families of American war veterans.

Buchanan and actress Mary Mouser announced their engagement in February 2025. They met in October 2017 during the filming of the first season of the series Cobra Kai.

== Filmography ==
=== Film ===
Year	Title	Role	Notes
2013	Jake Squared	Sammy Klein	
2014	Guests	Bobby Bell	Short film
2014	Ellie	Bowie	Short film
2015	The Heyday of the Insensitive Bastards	Bobby Bell	
2015	Alone in the Dust	Izzi	Short film
2017	Anything	Jack Sachman	
2019	Max Winslow and the House of Secrets	Connor Lawson	Also musician
2019	Sinister Seduction	Dylan Warren	
2020	Chance	Colton	
2021	He's All That	Cameron Kweller	
2021	Painted Beauty	Young Peter	
2022	The Hyperions	Apollo	
2024	How to Date Billy Walsh	Billy Walsh	
TBA	Gasoline	Eric Casey	Upcoming film
TBA	Hide and Don’t Speak	TBA	Upcoming film
TBA	The Sleeping Dogs of Southampton	Henry Barrett	Upcoming film

=== Television ===
Year	Title	Role	Notes
2010	Modern Family	Mummy Child	Episode: "Halloween"
2011	Untitled Jeff and Jackie Filgo Project	Jimmy	Unsold pilot
2012	The Real St. Nick	Cynical Kid	Television film
2013	Grey's Anatomy	Lucas	Episode: "Idle Hands"
2013	Major Crimes	Michelle Brand	Episode: "Boys Will Be Boys"
2013	Ghost Ghirls	Hero	Episode: "Field of Screams"
2013–2014	The Goldbergs	Evan Turner	Special participation; 2 episodes
2014	Growing Up Fisher	Slade	Episode: "Work with Me"
2014	Mixology	Young Dom	Episode: "Fab & Jessica & Dominic"
2015	Girl Meets World	Charlie Gardner	Recurring role; 3 episodes
2015–2019	Game Shakers	Mason Kendall	Recurring role; 6 episodes
2016	The Fosters	Jack Downey	Recurring role; 6 episodes
2016–2018	Designated Survivor	Leo Kirkman	Main role; 28 episodes
2017	Fuller House	Chad Brad Bradley	Special participation; 2 episodes Also dancer
2018	The Goldbergs: 1990-Something	Mike Stamm	Schooled backdoor pilot
2018–2025	Cobra Kai	Robby Keene	Main role; 61 episodes
2020	Deputy	Brendan	Episode: "10-8 Entitlements"
2025	Star Wars: Visions	Prince Arluu (voice)	Main role; 1 episode

=== Video games ===
Year	Title	Role	Notes
2027	Until Dawn 2	Cameron	

== Awards and nominations ==
Award	Year	Category	Nominated work	Result	Ref.
Jury Prize Awards	2019	Best Supporting Actor	Max Winslow and the House of Secrets	Nominated	
