= One Fat Summer =

Book by Robert Lipsyte

- First edition
- Author: Robert Lipsyte
- Language: English
- Genre: Teen drama
- Publisher: Harper & Row
- Publication date: 1977
- Publication place: United States
- Media type: Print (hardback & paperback)
- ISBN: 978-0-064-47073-5

One Fat Summer is a teen drama novel written by American author Robert Lipsyte, published in 1977. In 2018, the novel was adapted into a motion picture titled Measure of a Man, starring Blake Cooper, Donald Sutherland, Luke Wilson, and Judy Greer and was distributed by Great Point Media.

== Synopsis ==
Bobby Marks, an overweight 14-year-old boy, experiences a coming of age summer, in which he learns to stand up for himself.

== Characters ==
- Bobby Marks: the protagonist of the story, an overweight 14-year-old boy
- Dr. Kahn: an estate owner who hires Bobby to manage his lawn
- Lenore Marks: Bobby's mother
- Marty Marks: Bobby's father
- Michelle Marks: Bobby's older sister
- Pete Marino: Michelle's boyfriend
- Joanie Williams: Bobby's friend
- Willie Rumson: the antagonist of the story, Bobby's nemesis

== Inspiration ==
The protagonist of One Fat Summer, Bobby Marks, is similar to author Robert Lipsyte: Bobby is an adolescent in the 1950s, suffering from a weight problem, who does something about it. He takes a summer job mowing lawns and, as a result, loses weight and gains self-confidence. In 1952, Lipsyte took a summer job as a lawn boy and lost forty pounds, ridding himself of the youthful stigma of excess weight.

== Film adaptation ==
In June 2015, director Jim Loach started pre-production for the film with screenwriter David Scearce, who wrote the screenplay, based on Robert Lipsyte's novel. The film went into production several months later when Donald Sutherland and The Maze Runner star Blake Cooper joined the cast on September 23, 2015. Sutherland plays Dr. Kahn, and Blake Cooper plays character Bobby. On October 5, 2015, Judy Greer and Luke Wilson joined the film alongside Sutherland and Cooper, to play Bobby's parents. The film was released on May 11, 2018.

== See also ==
- 1977 in literature
- List of teen dramas
