= Measure of a Man (film) =

- Theatrical release poster
- Directed by: Jim Loach
- Screenplay by: David Scearce
- Based on: One Fat Summer by Robert Lipsyte
- Produced by: Christian Taylor
- Starring: Blake Cooper; Donald Sutherland; Judy Greer; Luke Wilson
- Cinematography: Denson Baker
- Edited by: Dany Cooper
- Music by: Ilan Eshkeri; Tim Wheeler
- Production companies: Taylor Lane Productions; Weedon Media
- Distributed by: Great Point Media, Lionsgate Films
- Release date: May 11, 2018
- Running time: 100 minutes
- Country: United States
- Language: English

Measure of a Man, also known as American Summer in the United Kingdom, is a 2018 American comedy-drama film directed by Jim Loach and written by David Scearce, based on the 1977 novel One Fat Summer by the author Robert Lipsyte. The film stars Blake Cooper, Donald Sutherland, Judy Greer, and Luke Wilson.

== Cast ==
- Blake Cooper as Bobby Marks, Michelle's brother and Lenore and Marty's son
- Donald Sutherland as Dr. Kahn, a Wall Street executive who gives Bobby a summer job on his estate
- Judy Greer as Lenore Marks, Michelle and Bobby's mother and Marty's wife
- Luke Wilson as Marty Marks, Michelle and Bobby's father and Lenore's husband
- Liana Liberato as Michelle Marks, Bobby's sister and Lenore and Marty's daughter
- Beau Knapp as Willie Rumson, the main antagonist of the film
- Luke Benward as Pete Marino
- Danielle Rose Russell as Joanie Williams
- Sam Keeley as Jim Smith

== Production ==
In June 2015, director Jim Loach started pre-production for the film with screenwriter David Scearce, who wrote the screenplay, based on the 1977 novel One Fat Summer by Robert Lipsyte. The film went into production several months later when Donald Sutherland and The Maze Runner star Blake Cooper joined the cast on September 23, 2015. Sutherland was cast as Dr. Kahn, a Wall Street executive who gives Blake Cooper's character, Bobby, a summer job on his estate. On October 5, 2015, Judy Greer and Luke Wilson joined the film alongside Sutherland and Cooper, to play Bobby's parents, and Liana Liberato joined the cast to play his sister, Michelle.

Principal photography for the film took place in Rhode Island, United States.

== Release ==
The film had a limited U.S theatrical release by Great Point Media on May 11, 2018. Lionsgate released the film on August 7, 2018 on SVOD and DVD. Measure of a Man screened in competition on October 19 and 20, 2018 at the Alice nella Citta section of the Rome Film Festival. The film was released by Kinostar Filmverleih on June 13, 2019 in Germany.

== Reception ==
=== Critical response ===
On review aggregator website Rotten Tomatoes, the film holds an approval rating of 52% based on 25 reviews, with an average rating of 6.2/10. The site's critical consensus reads, "Measure of a Man has a handful of ingredients that set it apart from the crowded field of coming-of-age dramas -- but not enough, unfortunately, to make it worth seeking out." On Metacritic the film has a weighted average score of 53%, based on reviews from 12 critics, indicating "mixed or average reviews".

Michael O'Sullivan from The Washington Post gave the film a 3.5 out of 4 stars and said, "Measure of a Man is a funny, wise movie about bullying that speaks to kids and grown-ups alike".

Richard Roeper at The Chicago Sun-Times gave it a 3.5 out of 4 stars and said, "It's a sweet and knowing and lovely and funny story, but occasionally the spell of warm nostalgia is broken by painful moments of family heartbreak and cruel bullying".

Michael Rechtshaffen at The Los Angeles Times gave the film a positive review and said, "Measure of a Man offers decisive proof that fresh and different is overrated when you've got a strong cast, a beautifully written script and fittingly measured direction".

By contrast, Mick LaSalle at the San Francisco Chronicle gave a critical review, describing it as a film of "gestures and feints, in which we’re constantly being told of events and relationships rather than seeing or feeling them." Dennis Harvey in Variety criticized it for bringing "no distinctive personality or plot angles to a very familiar set of misfit-hero woes and eventual, underwhelming triumphs," and further commented that the film's "conflicts come to no interesting fruition."

=== Accolades ===
Director of photography Denson Baker won the Features Gold Award at the 2018 New Zealand Cinematographers Society Awards. Blake Cooper took home the Jury Prize for Best Youth Performance in a Feature Film for Youth at the 2019 Zlín Film Festival.

== See also ==
- 2018 in film
