= The Hyperions =

- Release poster
- Directed by: Jon McDonald
- Written by: Jon McDonald
- Produced by: Jon McDonald; Justin Bell; Jon Michael Kondrath
- Starring: Cary Elwes; Penelope Mitchell; Tanner Buchanan; Elaine Tan; Alphonso McAuley
- Cinematography: Jason Ball
- Edited by: Chris Witt
- Music by: Oumi Kapila
- Production companies: Saban Films; American Millimetre; Justin Bell Productions; ReKon Productions
- Distributed by: The Daily Wire
- Release date: March 10, 2022
- Running time: 90 minutes
- Country: United States
- Language: English

The Hyperions is a 2022 American superhero action-comedy film written and directed by Jon McDonald and starring Cary Elwes, Penelope Mitchell, Tanner Buchanan, Elaine Tan, and Alphonso McAuley.

== Plot ==
In 1960, Professor Ruckus Mandulbaum invents a device known as Titan Badge, which offers humans superpowers by altering the wearer’s DNA. He gave three Badges to two down-on-their-luck children, and one adult— creating America's most famous family of superheroes, which included telepath Vista, super-strong Ansel, and teleporter Maya.

But over the years, as egos bruised and resentments developed, the professor replaced the team with newer members. In 1979, Vista and Ansel will stop at almost nothing to get the Titan Badges back. Their plan: stage a heist of their Titan Badges from The Hyperion Museum.

But the robbery runs into trouble when they realize that access to the badges requires Professor Mandulbaum’s biometric scan. So Vista and Ansel instead take the museum staff and visitors hostage, forcing a confrontation with their former father figure, the police, and, ultimately, against a supervillain, Ares, who threatens to destroy them all.

== Cast ==
- Cary Elwes as Professor Ruckus Mandulbaum
- Penelope Mitchell as Vista Mandulbaum
- Tanner Buchanan as Apollo
- Elaine Tan as Maya
- Alphonso McAuley as Ansel
- Keli Price as Ares
- Indi Star as Young Vista

== Production ==
In December 2018, it was announced that Elwes was cast in the film.

== Release ==
In June 2021, it was announced that Saban Films acquired North American distribution rights to the film. In February 2022, it was announced that The Daily Wire acquired the domestic rights to the film from Saban Films. The Daily Wire released the film on YouTube on March 10, 2022.

== Reception ==
Richard Propes of The Independent Critic gave the film 3.5 stars and called it a "retro-styled superhero flick with a campily beating heart" and "an imperfect yet sublimely inspired" film "that weaves together past and present, family and fantasy all into a motion picture that made me smile from beginning to end."

Alan Ng of Film Threat rated the film a 7.5 out of 10 and wrote that "the story of a family of Superheroes is excellent." He continued, "Add Professor Mandulbaum as a father, who should never be a father, and the exploration of power granted and taken away absolutely works." But he noted that the film's "overall energy" was "low," which he thought was a "a creative choice" by the director. "In the end," Ng wrote, "The Hyperions is good, not great… worse, as it has the potential to be great."

Matthew Pejkovic of Matt's Movie Reviews gave the film 3 stars and called it "a surprisingly tender exploration of family and abandonment that embraces the quirky campiness of its 1970s kitsch setting" with "[d]ry, absurdist humour that is reminiscent of the films of Wes Anderson and Jared Hess." He wrote that "[a]lthough its style is retro, its themes remain poignantly relevant." However, he noted that some of the performances were lacking.
