= Elaine Tan =

English actress

- Born: London, England
- Education: Sylvia Young Theatre School
- Alma mater: University of Exeter
- Occupation: Actress
- Years active: 1988–present
- Known for: Starter for 10

Elaine Tan is an English actress.

== Early life ==
Tan trained at the Sylvia Young Theatre School before graduating from the University of Exeter with a degree in Law and completing the Legal Practice Certificate with Distinction.

== Career ==
In 2001, Tan was cast in the lead role of Liat by Trevor Nunn in his production of South Pacific at the Royal National Theatre, and sang the song "Happy Talk" as a duet with the character of Bloody Mary, which features on the cast album recorded at Abbey Road Studios.

In 2006, she was nominated for Best Actress at the ECU European Independent Film Festival.

Her television credits include Nighty Night, Auf Wiedersehen, Pet, EastEnders, 'Til Death, Boston Legal, Entourage, CSI: Crime Scene Investigation, Hawaii Five-0 and Doctor Who. She played Kelli Lin in Person of Interest, was Anne in Hand of God for Amazon, and Angeline Borgen in the Norwegian crime drama Frikjent.

Tan played Lucy Chang in the HBO feature film Starter for 10, Sala Khan in the film Jewtopia, April in Gina Prince-Bythewood's Beyond the Lights, Xandra in Paul Thomas Anderson's Inherent Vice, and Elyse in Tully.

In 2023, Tan joined the cast of The Lazarus Project in the role of Zhang. In 2025, she joined the cast of Virdee as Rebecca Armitage.

== Filmography ==
=== Film ===
Year	Film	Role
1988	Infantile Disorders	Tiny
2002	420 Seconds of Love	Holly
2003	Out for a kill	Luo Yi
2006	Apartment 406	Angela Proctor
2006	Starter for 10	Lucy Chang
2009	31 North 62 East	Mai Li
2012	Departure Date	Gorgeous Girl
2012	Mission Chinese	Antu
2014	Beyond the Lights	April
2014	Inherent Vice	Xandra
2018	Tully	Elyse
2022	The Hyperions	Maya

=== Television ===
Year	Title	Role
1988	Playbus	Unknown
1990	Alfonso Bonzo	Second Kid
1992	Uncle Jack	Yasmin
2001	Risk	Kim
2002–2003	Harry and Cosh	Stacey
2003	Trust	Jazz singer
2004	EastEnders	Receptionist
2004	Nighty Night	Gina
2004	Footballers' Wives	Candy
2004	Auf Wiedersehen, Pet	Waitress
2006	The Bill	Shona Dickins
2006	Hollyoaks: In the City	Gucci
2006–2007	EastEnders	Li Chong
2008	Boston Legal	Lisa
2009	'Til Death	Julie
2010	Fake It til You Make It	Leela
2011	Entourage	Tammy
2011	CSI: Crime Scene Investigation	Shizu Yoshi
2012	CSI: Crime Scene Investigation	Miss Lotus
2014	Person of Interest	Kelli
2014	Hawaii Five-0	Zi Chen
2014	Hand of God	Anne
2015–2016	Frikjent	Angeline Borgen
2015	Doctor Who	Nagata
2015	Grandfathered	Heidi
2019	Love, Death & Robots	Yan (voice)
2020	Get Even	Coach Evans
2022	Moonhaven (TV series)	Lone
2022–2023	The Lazarus Project	Zhang
2024	Red Eye	Shen
2025	Virdee	Rebecca Armitage
