= The Nigger Bible =

1967 book by Robert H. deCoy

The Nigger Bible is a book by Robert H. deCoy, originally self-published by deCoy and then reissued by Holloway House in 1967, and again in 1972 (ISBN 0-87067-619-9). Described as a "key statement" in the Black Power movement, it is a social and linguistic analysis of the word "nigger" and of the origins and contemporary circumstances of black people in the United States.

== Analysis ==
The form is varied and might be described as a series of reflections. In the preface, Dick Gregory (whose autobiography was entitled Nigger) writes: "In abolishing and rejecting the Caucasian-Christian philosophical and literary forms while recording his 'Black Experiences,' this writer has removed himself from their double-standard, hypocritical frames of reference".

It attempts to tease apart the cultural, philosophical, and scriptural origins of what the author calls an "Alabaster Man", one that experienced the conclusions and prejudices at the root of their oppression. It examines, among other texts, the Christian Bible and its terminology. The book explores the power of words, and reinterprets and critiques core western religious and philosophical constructs, including those that are central to much of the modern African-American religious experience. In one of the chapters, he discusses "the genealogy of Jody Grind"; Eugene B. Redmond remarks that deCoy is one of many African-American writers who "continues a tradition by seeking out folk epics and ballads as sources of poetry".

DeCoy re-examines the word "nigger", demystifies it, and attempts to embed critical thinking skills about black personality types and categories. The author deconstructs the Christianity of "Niggers" (including, in his view, Black Muslims) as well as the values of the New Left. The book contains an analysis of the cultural and racial significance of Mardi Gras.

DeCoy also published Cold Black Preach (1971, ISBN 0-87067-627-X). The Black Scholar summarized: "Noted author of the explosive best seller The Nigger Bible takes on the black preaching establishment".
