= David Scearce =

Lawyer and screenwriter

David Scearce is a lawyer and screenwriter.

== Career ==
=== Law ===
Scearce earned a business degree from Wilfrid Laurier University and a law degree from the University of British Columbia before joining the Justice Department.

=== Film ===
In 2000, Scearce decided to write screenplays in his spare time. One of his first attempts was an adaptation of a favourite novel—A Single Man by Christopher Isherwood. Don Bachardy, Isherwood's surviving partner who managed the rights to the story, approved of the script and it was then picked up by fashion designer and first-time film director Tom Ford. A Single Man, starring Colin Firth and Julianne Moore, premiered at the Venice Film Festival in September 2009 and was released in December 2009. It and its cast and crew received critical acclaim as well as numerous awards and nominations, including a Critics' Choice Movie Award nomination for Best Screenplay and an Independent Spirit Award nomination for Best First Screenplay.

Scearce's second film adaptation, Measure of a Man, a coming-of-age story based on Robert Lipsyte's novel One Fat Summer, starring Blake Cooper and Donald Sutherland, was released in 2018.

In 2018, Scearce was hired by the Michael Grandage Company to write an adaptation of Jack and Lem, a biography by David Pitts about President John F. Kennedy and his gay best friend, Lem Billings.
