= Chance (2020 film) =

2020 American drama film

- Film poster
- Directed by: John B. Crye
- Written by: Michael P. Daly; Seth Daly
- Produced by: Michael Hagerty
- Starring: Matthew Modine; Amanda Leighton; Blake Cooper; Tanner Buchanan; Jake Hertzman; Pamela Daly
- Cinematography: Corey Weintraub
- Edited by: Todd Sandler
- Music by: Ian Honeyman
- Production companies: SharpCrye; Voyage Media
- Distributed by: Flash Film
- Release date: May 22, 2020 (Amelia, Ohio)
- Running time: 109 minutes
- Country: United States
- Language: English

Chance is a 2020 American drama film directed by John B. Crye and starring Matthew Modine. It is based on the true story of Chance Smith, a teenager from Ohio who killed himself. It is also Crye's feature directorial debut.

== Cast ==
- Matthew Modine as Mike Daly
- Blake Cooper as Chance Smith
- Jake Hertzman as Young Chance
- Tanner Buchanan as Colton
- Amanda Leighton as Brooke
- Pamela Daly as Nina
- Michelle Gardner as Principal Miller

== Production ==
The film was shot in Brown County, Ohio.

== Release ==
The film was originally scheduled to be released in limited theaters in Ohio and Kentucky on April 9, 2020. However, due to the COVID-19 pandemic, the film was officially released on May 22, 2020 at the Starlite Drive In in Amelia, Ohio.
