= Nigger: An Autobiography by Dick Gregory =

1964 autobiography by Dick Gregory

Nigger
- First hard cover edition
- Author: Dick Gregory, with Robert Lipsyte
- Language: English
- Subject: African American culture, Asian American culture
- Genre: Autobiography
- Publisher: E. P. Dutton h/b Pocket Books p/b
- Publication date: September 1964
- Publication place: United States
- Media type: Hardcover
- Pages: 209
- Dewey Decimal: 927.92
- LC Class: PN2287.G68 A3
- Followed by: Write Me In! (1968)

Nigger is the autobiography of American comedian and social activist Dick Gregory, co-authored with Robert Lipsyte. It was originally published in September 1964 by E. P. Dutton, and has since 1965 been reprinted numerous times in an edition available through Pocket Books, altogether selling more than one million copies to date. The book has never been out of print since its publication. Gregory continued his life story in two subsequent books, Up From Nigger and Callus On My Soul. Gregory earned a $200,000 advance from the book.

== Origins ==
The book was written during the American Civil Rights Movement. Gregory comments on his choice of title in the primary dedication, addressing his late mother:

Dear Momma -- Wherever you are, if ever you hear the word "nigger" again, remember they are advertising my book.

== Table of contents ==
- Not Poor, Just Broke
- "...and they didn't even have what I wanted."
- One Less Door

The book contains photographs of Gregory performing at the Village Gate; he and his brother (1942); his mother, Lucille; Gregory as a drummer at Southern Illinois University (1953); as an SIU sprinter and Outstanding Athlete of the Year (1953); with coach Leland Lingle (1954); with Sammy Davis Jr. at Roberts Show Club, Chicago (1959); in a jail cell in Chicago; performing at the Hungry i, San Francisco (1963, shortly before the murder of Medgar Evers); at a voter registration rally, Greenwood, Mississippi (April 1963), among others.

== Quotes ==
Addressing his maternal ancestors again,

You didn't die a slave for nothing, Momma. You brought us up. You and all those Negro mothers who gave their kids the strength to go on, to take that thimble to the well while the whites were taking buckets. Those of us who weren't destroyed got stronger, got calluses on our souls. And now we're ready to change a system, a system where a white man can destroy a black man with a single word. Nigger.

== Cover title ==
The original book cover stylizes the main title, "nigger", in all lower case, cursive writing. The title in its other appearances is otherwise formatted as most other books, either in all uppercase, or with normal book title capitalization.

== Reception ==
The New York Times wrote, in its review,

Powerful and ugly and beautiful...a moving story of a man who deeply wants a world without malice and hate and is doing something about it."

The book has been the subject of critical commentary, particularly in reference to its use of the pejorative term as the title. It remains one of his best known works.

In 2016, the Dean of Matteo Ricci College at Seattle University was forced to resign after students protested her recommending the book to an African-American student. While the controversy was ongoing, Dick Gregory published an article supporting her against the protesters.

== See also ==
- The Nigger Bible, a 1967 analysis of the word, with a preface by Gregory
