= The Contender (Lipsyte novel) =

1967 novel by Robert Lipsyte

- First edition
- Author: Robert Lipsyte
- Cover artist: Robert Lipsyte
- Language: English
- Genre: Young adult literature
- Publisher: Harper & Row
- Publication date: 1967
- Publication place: United States
- English publication date: 1968
- Media type: Print (hardcover and paperback)
- Pages: 227 pp
- Followed by: The Brave

The Contender is the debut novel by American author and sports journalist Robert Lipsyte. It was published in 1967.

The book's plot centers on a black seventeen-year-old man named Alfred Brooks, a high school dropout living with Aunt Pearl and her three daughters in Harlem, New York City. He begins training at a boxing club as an alternative to drugs and gang membership. The novel follows Alfred as his friend James is arrested after robbing the grocery store where Alfred works, and his confrontations with Major, the leader of the local gang, who is responsible for James' drug addiction. Alfred, through a series of related events, learns that life is about more than fighting and winning; it is about being a contender.

== Characters ==
- Alfred Brooks is a 17-year-old African American male and the protagonist of the novel. He recently dropped out of high school and appears to be indecisive about the direction of his life. Orphaned at a young age, he lives in Harlem with his Aunt Pearl and his three cousins. In the first few chapters, Alfred appears shy and uncertain about his future. After learning that his best friend James has chosen a destructive path, Alfred decides to join Donatelli's Gym and train as an amateur boxer. Throughout the course of the novel, readers see a timid adolescent transcend into a confident, strong character who appears to have found a purpose in life. By the end of the novel, after having won his first two matches, and putting up a good show in his third match, Mr. Donatelli suggests that Alfred retire from boxing because he lacks the "killer instinct" needed to be a prize-winning fighter, but suggests that Alfred take his newfound strength and determination and apply it to a new endeavor. Alfred does retire after one final match which he loses, but in which he earns everyone's respect, including that of his opponent. Before the novel closes, Alfred has evolved into a mature, selfless adolescent who seems destined to apply what he learned from being a disciplined boxer to having a bright future all the while trying to save his best friend from continuing to be self-destructive.
- Aunt Pearl takes in her nephew Alfred after he is orphaned at an early age. She is a devoted, hard-working, and loving woman as evidenced by the many sacrifices she makes not only for her own three children but for Alfred as well. She too has experienced difficulties in life, some of which she divulges to Alfred. Although there are times that her questions seem obtrusive to Alfred, he realizes that she truly has a vested interest in her nephew, and that she does care about his well-being.
- Major is the antagonist of the novel. He is described as a "devil in disguise". Major is responsible for leading Alfred's best friend James down a path of crime, drugs, and alcohol. He lives a life of crime and orchestrated a robbery at the Epsteins' grocery store, Alfred's place of employment. He is the leader of a group that has some other characters in it by the names of Hollis and Sonny. These three team up against Alfred and beat him up in the first chapter.
- James is Alfred's best friend and also a high school dropout. While James only appears minimally, we learn a great deal about him from Alfred's thoughts and what others say about him. He is a weak character, as compared to Alfred. After James robs the grocery store Alfred works at, Epstein's, Alfred finds him hiding from the police in their childhood hiding spot in the park. Alfred convinces James that he needs to take responsibility for his recent criminal behavior by entering rehab and accepting his impending future jail sentence. Alfred tells him that no matter what, he will stay by the side of his "old" friend.
- Mr. Donatelli, affectionately called Donatelli by most of the novel's characters, is owner and manager of Donatelli's Gym. He becomes Alfred's savior by hinting at Alfred's potential to become a respected boxer while encouraging his new protégé to make decisions wisely and to act decisively. Although he comes across as harsh, he is a man who has gained respect as a disciplined trainer who cares about the well-being of his students both mentally and physically, in and out of the ring.

== Themes ==
The main theme explored in this novel is the idea that the challenge (or journey) is more valuable than the outcome.

== Reception ==
The novel received a starred review from Kirkus Reviews, which called it "honest and taut and incisive" and "the best sports novel since early Tunis".
