= Robert Lipsyte =

American sports journalist, novelist (born 1938)

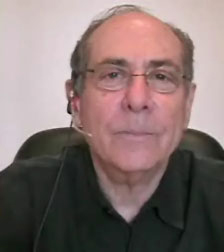
- Born: January 16, 1938 (age 88); New York City, US
- Occupations: Sports journalist, author
- Employer(s): New York Times, ESPN, CBS, NBC, various publishers
- Children: 2
- Website: robertlipsyte.com

Robert Michael Lipsyte (born January 16, 1938) is an American sports journalist and author and former ombudsman for ESPN. He is a member of the Board of Contributors for USA Today's Forum Page, part of the newspaper's Opinion section. He received the Margaret Edwards Award from the American Library Association in 2001 for his contribution in writing for teens.

== Personal background ==
Lipsyte was born on January 16, 1938, in New York City, the son of Fanny (Finston) and Sidney I. Lipsyte. He grew up in Rego Park, a neighborhood in the New York city borough of Queens. Lipsyte's father was a school principal, his mother a teacher. Young Robert devoted his childhood to books rather than sports. Instead of sharing a game of catch with his father, the two often visited the library. Robert's son, Sam Lipsyte, is also an author and teacher at Columbia University in New York.

In the first chapter of his 1976 book SportsWorld, which considers the role of sports in American culture, Lipsyte points out that he did not even attend his first Major League Baseball game until he was thirteen years old, despite the fact that there were three major league teams in New York (the Yankees, the Giants, and the Dodgers) during his childhood. Lipsyte says he was “profoundly disappointed” with his experience at the game and so went to only one more game “as a paying customer.” His third major league game was as a sports reporter for the New York Times.

As a boy, Lipsyte did play Chinese handball against the sides of brick buildings and participated in street games such as stickball, but he felt acute pressure to excel at sports which discouraged his interest. This experience later developed into a major theme in some of Lipsyte's nonfiction works such as SportsWorld and novels like Jock and Jill (1982) and his trilogy beginning with One Fat Summer (1977). The protagonist of One Fat Summer, Bobby Marks, is similar to Lipsyte: Bobby is an adolescent in the 1950s, suffering from a weight problem, who does something about it. In 1952, Lipsyte took a summer job as a lawn boy and lost forty pounds, ridding himself of the youthful stigma of excess weight.

== Television ==
Lipsyte has done work as a correspondent for both CBS and NBC, in addition to an Emmy-winning stint as host of WNET/Thirteen's The Eleventh Hour in the late 1980s.

== Works of nonfiction ==
Much of Lipsyte's nonfiction deals with sports, but here again he rarely takes a conventional approach. He is especially concerned that children are subjected to sports in negative ways. Sports, he argues, should be fun and entertaining; winning need not be the only goal. Although he is not anti-sport, he is disillusioned by a culture of champions that he calls "Sportsworld." SportsWorld, as Lipsyte points out in the book by that name, "is a grotesque distortion of sports." It honors the winner more than the race. As illustrated in The Contender, Lipsyte values the process more than the result; competing well is more important than winning itself.

Lipsyte was among the first to accept and respect the heavyweight boxing champ Muhammad Ali. His agreement that Ali should be allowed to be himself is echoed in the title of his 1978 book on the complicated man: "Free to Be Muhammad Ali".

He co-authored comedian and social activist Dick Gregory's 1964 autobiography, Nigger.

In 1978, Lipsyte was diagnosed with testicular cancer. Despite his eventual recovery from that first bout, he was diagnosed with cancer a second time in 1991. His experience with the illness led to another novel for young adults, The Chemo Kid (1992). In it, the protagonist, Fred Bauer, an ordinary high school junior in almost every way, discovers he has cancer and undergoes a series of experimental hormone treatments. Miraculously, Fred acquires superpowers, apparently due to the treatments, and becomes “The Chemo Kid,” fighting for the environment and against drug dealers.

An adult consideration of cancer, and sickness in general, is Lipsyte's 1998 nonfiction work, In the Country of Illness. Here, he speaks of infirmity as if it is a foreign land, a place he calls “Malady . . . another country, scary and strange.” Basing his accounts on his own experiences, as well as those of other family members, he comforts, advises, warns, and informs the reader with tenderness, insight, and wit. Lipsyte's second wife, Margie, learned that she had breast cancer after their divorce.

In a 2009 interview with SportsMediaGuide, Lipsyte said that he has come to realize "that most jocks are sissies ...".

Lipsyte's 2011 autobiography, An Accidental Sportswriter, looks back at his long, unconventional career as a sports journalist at The New York Times and other outlets.

In addition to the Emmy, Lipsyte's honors and awards include the Dutton Best Sports Stories Award, E. P. Dutton, 1964, 1965, 1967, 1971, and 1976; the Mike Berger Award, Columbia University Graduate School of Journalism, 1966 and 1996; Wel-Met Children's Book Award, 1967; New York Times outstanding children's book of the year citation, 1977; American Library Association best young adult book citation, 1977; and New Jersey Author citation, 1978.

Lipsyte has been a resident of Closter, New Jersey. He was inducted into the New Jersey Literary Hall of Fame in 1993.

The ALA Margaret A. Edwards Award recognizes one writer and a particular body of work for "significant and lasting contribution to young adult literature". Lipsyte won the annual award in 2001, citing four books published from 1967 to 1993. According to the citation, "The Contender and its sequels, The Brave and The Chief transformed the sports novel to authentic literature with their gritty depiction of the boxing world. An ongoing theme is the struggle of their protagonists to seek personal victory by their continuing efforts towards a better life despite defeats. The same theme appears in the humorous One Fat Summer, in which an overweight boy deals with the timeless angst of body image and which was adapted by David Scearce into the 2018 film Measure of a Man. Lipsyte's books focus on the search for self-definition by young adults."

At one point, One Fat Summer was removed from the syllabus of the Levittown, New York public school system after complaints were made about its depiction of its teenage protagonist's sexual fantasies. The decision was criticized by educators, civil libertarians, and the author Judy Blume.
