= Dick Gregory =

American comedian, actor, writer, activist and social critic (1932–2017)

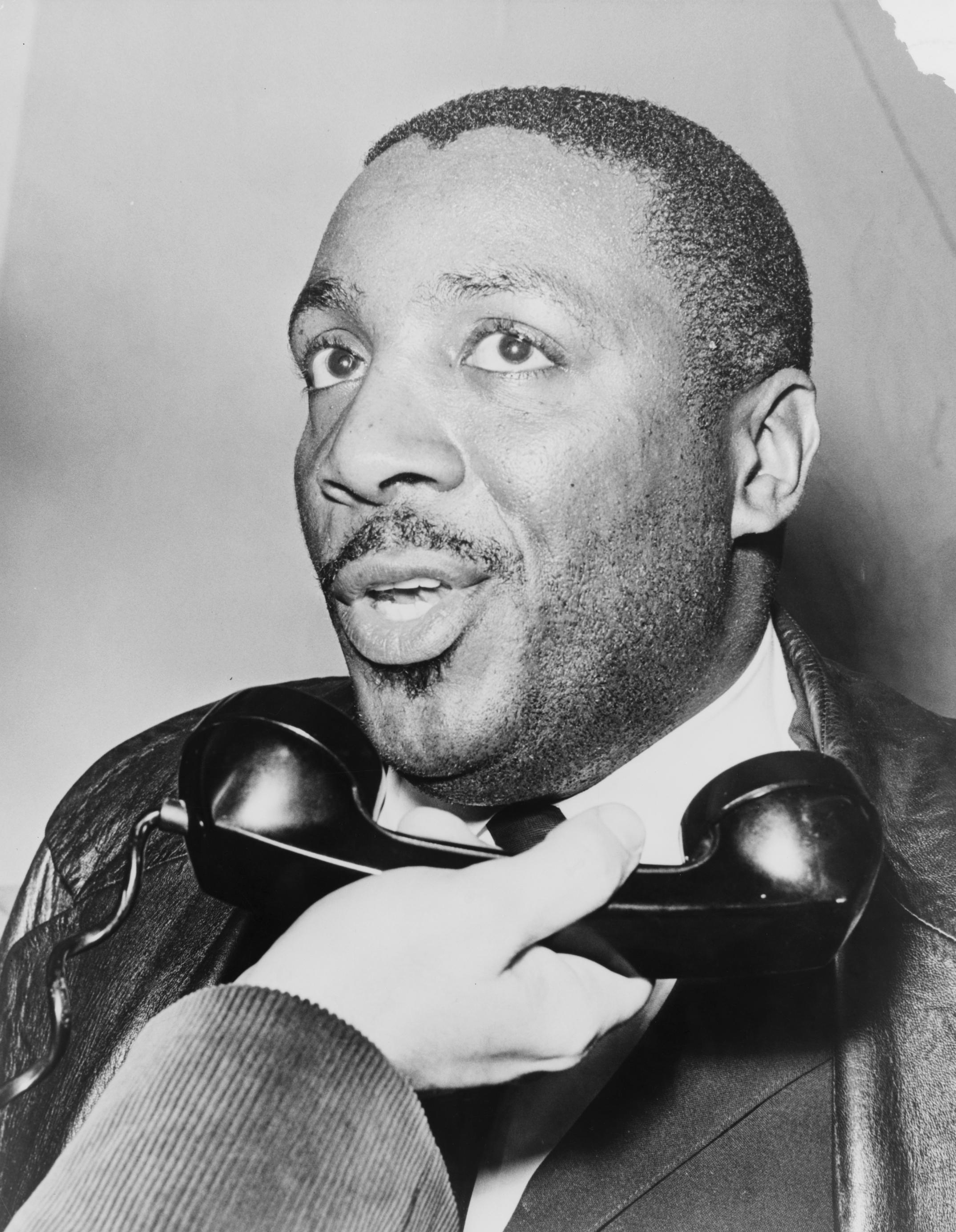
- Gregory in 1964
- Born: Richard Claxton Gregory; October 12, 1932; St. Louis, Missouri, U.S.
- Died: August 19, 2017 (aged 84); Washington, D.C., U.S.
- Education: Southern Illinois University
- Occupations: Comedian; actor; writer; activist; social critic
- Years active: 1954–2017
- Spouse: Lillian Smith (m. 1959)
- Children: 11
- Notable work: In Living Black and White (1961); Nigger: An Autobiography by Dick Gregory (1964); Write Me In! (1968)

Comedy career
- Medium: Stand-up; film; television; books
- Subjects: American civil rights; American politics; American culture; African-American culture; racism; race relations; vegetarianism; healthy diet

Richard Claxton Gregory (October 12, 1932 – August 19, 2017) was an American comedian, actor, writer, left-wing activist and social critic. He became popular among the African-American communities in the southern United States with his "no-holds-barred" sets, poking fun at the bigotry and racism in the United States. In 1961, he became a staple in the comedy clubs, appeared on television, and released comedy record albums.

Gregory was at the forefront of political activism in the 1960s, when he protested against the Vietnam War and racial injustice, and advocated for animal rights. He was arrested multiple times and went on many hunger strikes. He later became a speaker and author, with his autobiography selling more than a million copies.

== Early life ==
Gregory was born in St. Louis, Missouri, the son of Lucille, a house cleaner, and Presley Gregory. At Sumner High School, he was aided by teachers, among them Warren St. James; he also excelled at running, winning the state cross-country championship in 1950. Gregory earned a track scholarship to Southern Illinois University (SIU), where he set school records as a half-miler and miler. He was named the university's outstanding student athlete of the year in 1953. He was a member of Alpha Phi Alpha fraternity. In 1954, his college career was interrupted for two years when he was drafted into the United States Army. At the urging of his commanding officer, who had taken notice of his penchant for joking, Gregory got his start in comedy in the Army, where he entered and won several talent shows. In 1956, Gregory briefly returned to SIU after his discharge, but dropped out because he felt that the university "didn't want me to study, they wanted me to run."

In the hopes of becoming a professional comedian, Gregory moved to Chicago, where he became part of a new generation of black comedians that included Nipsey Russell, Bill Cosby, and Godfrey Cambridge, all of whom broke with the minstrel tradition that presented blacks stereotypically. Gregory drew on current events, especially racial issues, for much of his material: "Segregation is not all bad. Have you ever heard of a collision where the people in the back of the bus got hurt?"

== Career ==
=== 1956–1964: Comedy career ===
External videos
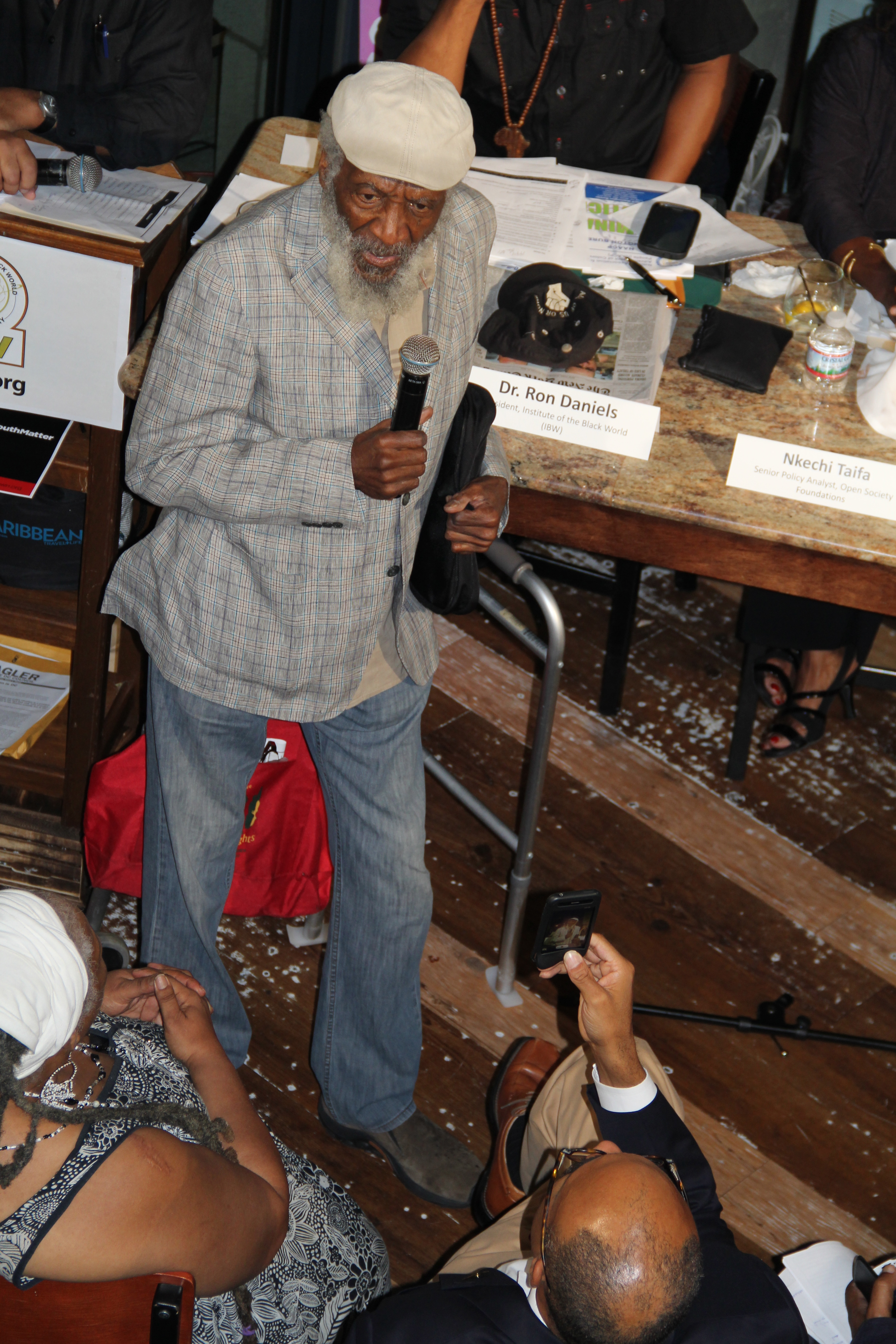
- Dick Gregory: Advice to Young African Americans, National Visionary Leadership Project
- Dick Gregory: The Civil Rights Movement – Part 1, National Visionary Leadership Project
- Booknotes interview with Gregory on Callus on My Soul: A Memoir, March 4, 2001, C-SPAN

Gregory started helping his family with the gigs he started to get at a young age. Gregory began his career as a comedian while serving in the military in the mid-1950s. He served in the Army for a year and a half at Fort Cavazos, formerly known as Fort Hood in Texas, Fort Lee in Virginia, and Fort Smith in Arkansas. He was drafted in 1954 while attending Southern Illinois University. After being discharged in 1956, he returned to the university but did not receive a degree. He moved to Chicago with a desire to perform comedy professionally. In 1958, Gregory opened the Apex Club nightclub in Illinois. The club failed and landed Gregory in financial hardship. In 1959, Gregory landed a job as master of ceremonies at the Roberts Show Club.

While working for the United States Postal Service during the daytime, Gregory performed as a comedian in small, primarily black-patronized nightclubs of the Chitlin' Circuit. In an interview with The Huffington Post, Gregory described the history of black comics as limited: "Blacks could sing and dance in the white night clubs but weren't allowed to stand flat-footed and talk to white folks, which is what a comic does."

In 1961, Gregory was working at the black-owned Roberts Show Bar in Chicago when he was spotted by Hugh Hefner.

Good evening, ladies and gentlemen. I understand there are a good many Southerners in the room tonight. I know the South very well. I spent twenty years there one night. Last time I was down South I walked into this restaurant and this white waitress came up to me and said, "We don't serve colored people here." I said, "That's all right. I don't eat colored people. Bring me a whole fried chicken." Then these three white boys came up to me and said, "Boy, we're giving you fair warning. Anything you do to that chicken, we're gonna do to you." So I put down my knife and fork, I picked up that chicken and I kissed it. Then I said, "Line up, boys!"

Gregory attributed the launch of his career to Hefner. Based on his performance at Roberts Show Bar, Hefner hired Gregory to work at the Chicago Playboy Club as a replacement for comedian "Professor" Irwin Corey.

In 1961, Gregory made his New York debut at The Blue Angel nightclub, also recording a live set there, "Dick Gregory at the Blue Angel" for his album East & West. He soon came back to Chicago and finally got his big break at the Playboy Club in Chicago, also in 1961, that was supposed to be one night and ended up being six weeks and earned him a spot in Time and a guest appearance on Jack Paar's show and other night clubs shows, etc.

Gregory's comedy occasioned controversy in some conservative white circles. The administration of the University of Tennessee, for instance, branded Gregory an "extreme racist" whose "appearance would be an outrage and an insult to many citizens of this state", and revoked his invitation by students to speak on campus. The students sued, with noted litigator William Kunstler as their counsel, and in Smith v. University of Tennessee, 300 F. Supp. 777 (E.D. Tenn. 1969), won an order from the court that the university's policy was "too broad and vague". The University of Tennessee then implemented an "open speaker" system, and Gregory subsequently performed in April 1970.

In 1964, Gregory's book, Nigger, was published. Since then, the book has never been out of print. In 2019, a trade paperback was published as well as an audio version. Gregory was number 82 on Comedy Central's list of the 100 Greatest Stand-ups of all time and had his own star on the St. Louis Walk of Fame.

=== 1967–1969: Political career ===
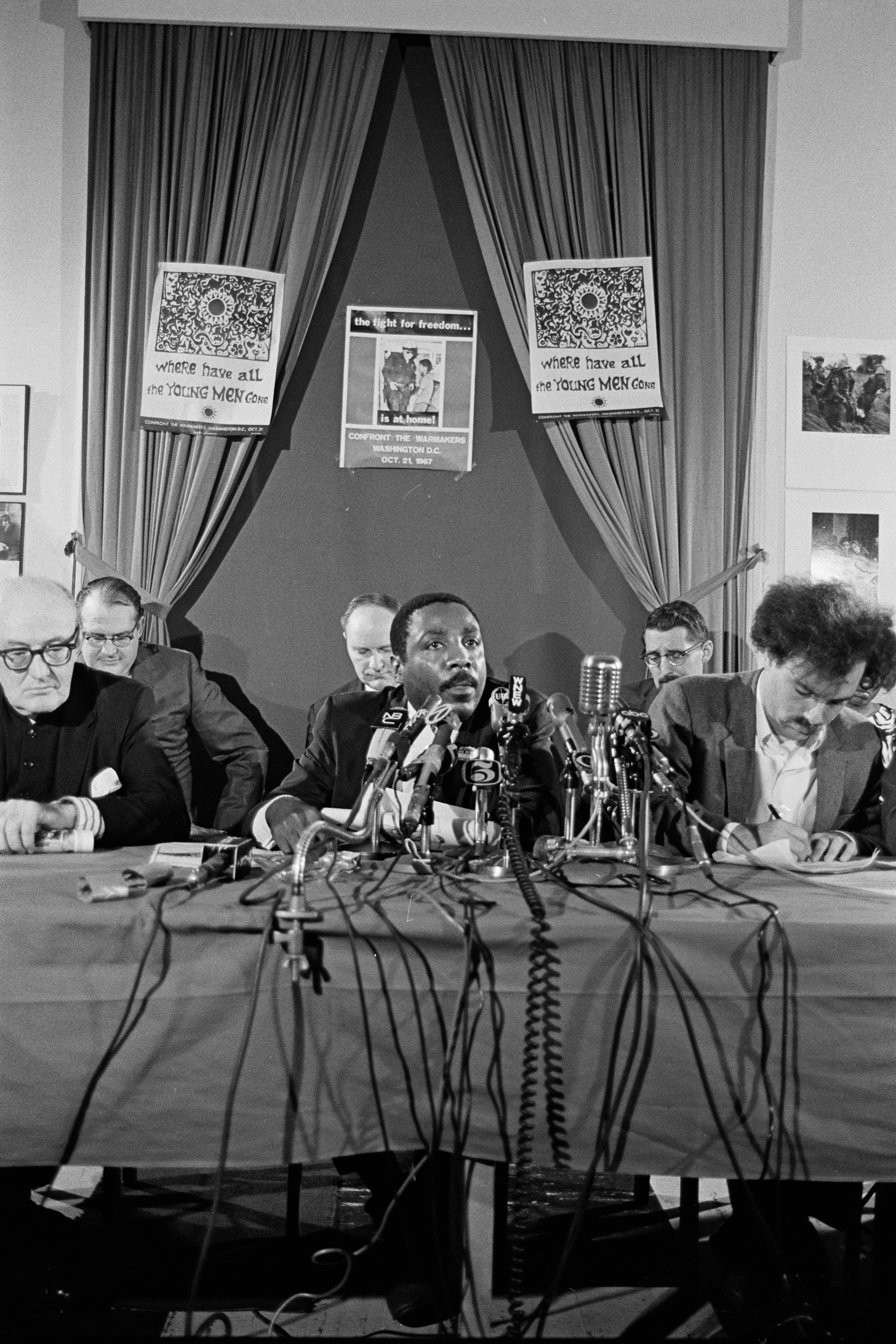
Gregory speaks at an anti-war press conference, August 1967

Gregory began his political career by running against Richard J. Daley for Mayor of Chicago in 1967. Though he did not win, this was not the end of his participation in electoral politics.

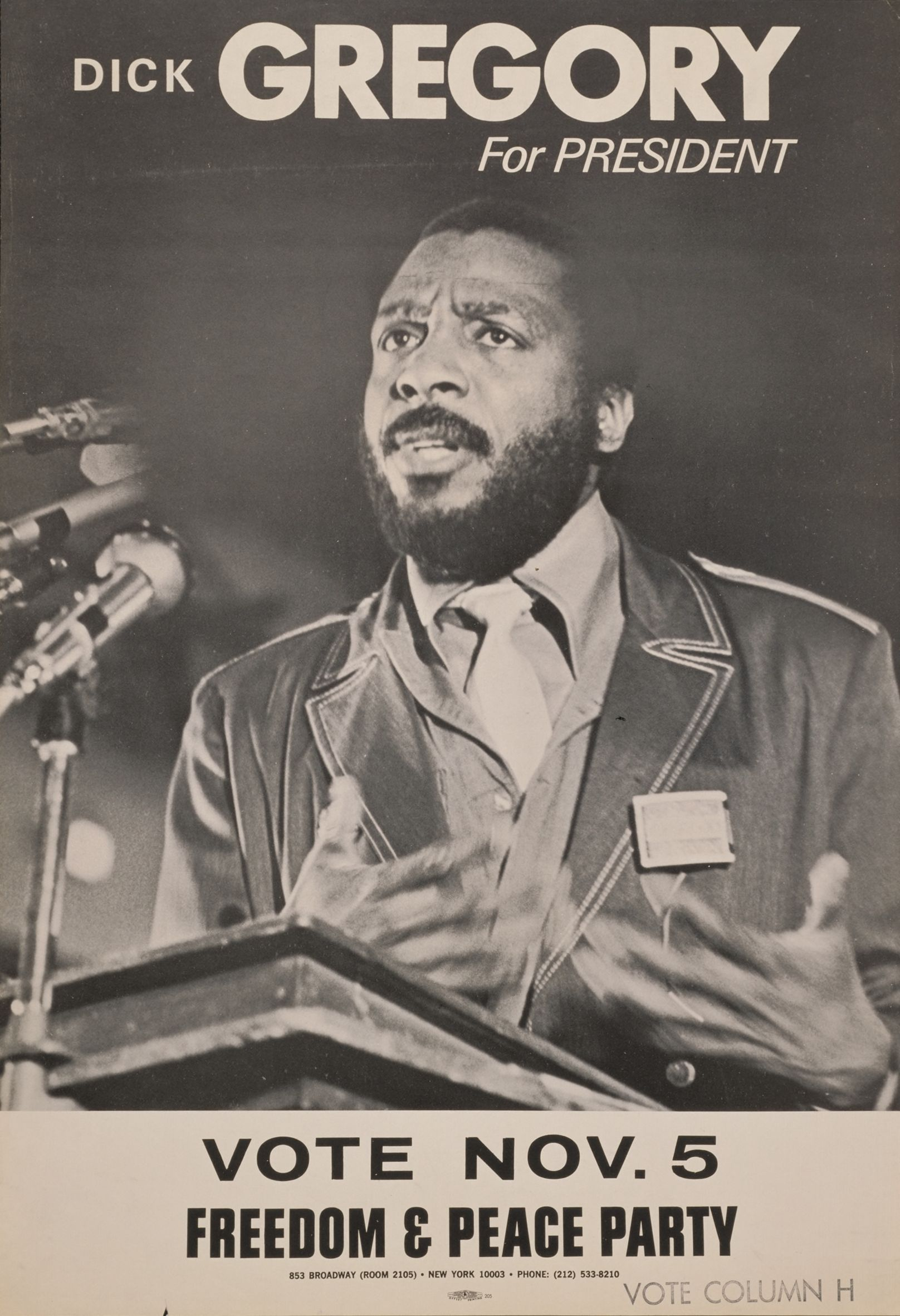
A 1968 Peace and Freedom Party campaign poster featuring Gregory as a candidate for President

Gregory ran for president in 1968 United States presidential election. He first sought the Peace and Freedom Party's nomination, but lost to Eldridge Cleaver at the party's national nominating convention. In the general election, he ran as a write-in candidate of the Freedom and Peace Party, which had splintered off from the Peace and Freedom Party. He garnered 47,097 votes in the general election, including one from Hunter S. Thompson, with fellow activist Mark Lane as his running mate in some states. His running mate in New Jersey was Dr. George Wallace of Plainfield, a biologist, Rutgers professor, and Chairman of NJ SANE (Committee for a Sane Nuclear Policy). Famed pediatrician Dr. Benjamin Spock was the running mate in Virginia and Pennsylvania garnering more than the party he had left. The Freedom and Peace Party also ran other candidates, including Beulah Sanders for the New York State Senate and Flora Brown for the New York State Assembly. Gregory's efforts landed him on the master list of Nixon's political opponents.

Gregory then wrote the book Write Me In! (1968) about his presidential campaign. One anecdote in the book relates the story of a publicity stunt that came out of Operation Breadbasket in Chicago. The campaign had printed one-dollar bills with Gregory's image on them, some of which made it into circulation. The majority of these bills were quickly seized by the federal government, much in part to the bills resembling authentic US currency enough to work in many dollar-cashing machines of the day. Gregory avoided being charged with a federal crime, later joking that the bills could not really be considered United States currency, because "everyone knows a black man will never be on a U.S. bill." On October 15, 1969, Gregory spoke at the Moratorium to End the War in Vietnam demonstration in Washington, D.C., where he joked to the crowd: "The President says nothing you kids do will have any effect on him. Well, I suggest he make one long-distance call to the LBJ ranch".

In Horace Ové's short film Baldwin's Nigger (1969), documenting a February 1968 lecture by James Baldwin delivered in London at the West Indian Students' Centre, followed by a question-and-answer session with the audience, Gregory features alongside Baldwin discussing Black experience and identity in Britain and the US.

=== 1970–2013: Post-standup career ===
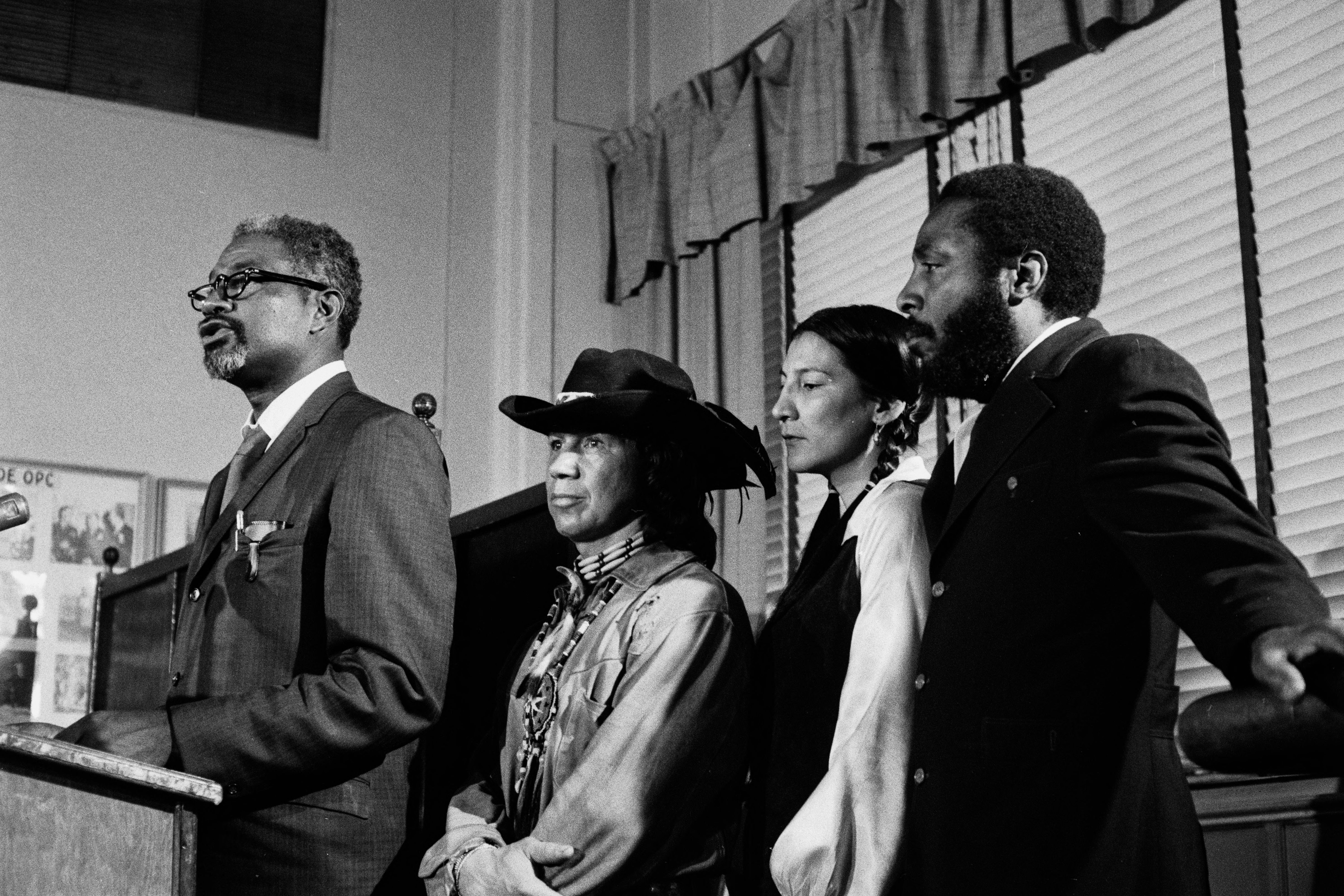
Gregory (far right) with Ossie Davis (far left) and others at a press conference charging the United States with genocide, June 18, 1970

He was a co-host with radio personality Cathy Hughes, and was a frequent morning guest, on WOL 1450 AM talk radio's The Power, the flagship station of Hughes' Radio One. He also appeared regularly on the nationally syndicated Imus in the Morning program.

Gregory appeared as "Mr. Sun" on the television show Wonder Showzen (the third episode, entitled "Ocean", aired in 2005). As Chauncey, a puppet character, imbibes a hallucinogenic substance, Mr. Sun warns: "Don't get hooked on imagination, Chauncey. It can lead to terrible, horrible things." Gregory also provided guest commentary on the Wonder Showzen Season One DVD. Large segments of his commentary were intentionally bleeped out, including the names of several dairy companies, as he made potentially defamatory remarks concerning ill effects that the consumption of cow milk has on human beings. Gregory attended and spoke at the funeral of James Brown on December 30, 2006, in Augusta, Georgia. Gregory was an occasional guest on the Mark Thompson's Make It Plain Sirius Channel 146 Radio Show from 3 pm to 6 pm PST. Gregory appeared on The Alex Jones Show on September 14, 2010, March 19, 2012, and April 1, 2014.

Gregory gave the keynote address for Black History Month at Bryn Mawr College on February 28, 2013. His take-away message to the students was to never accept injustice.

Once I accept injustice, I become injustice. For example, paper mills give off a terrible stench. But the people who work there don't smell it. Remember, Dr. King was assassinated when he went to work for garbage collectors. To help them as workers to enforce their rights. They couldn't smell the stench of the garbage all around them anymore. They were used to it. They would eat their lunch out of a brown bag sitting on the garbage truck. One day, a worker was sitting inside the back of the truck on top of the garbage, and got crushed to death because no one knew he was there.

Towards the end of his life, he was featured in a Fantagraphics book by Pat Thomas entitled Listen, Whitey: The Sights and Sounds of Black Power 1965–1975, which uses the political recordings of the Civil Rights era to highlight sociopolitical meanings throughout the movement. Gregory is known for comedic performances that not only made people laugh, but mocked the establishment. According to Thomas, Gregory's monologues reflect a time when entertainment needed to be political to be relevant, which is why he included his standup in the collection. Gregory is featured along with the likes of Malcolm X, Huey P. Newton, Jesse Jackson, Martin Luther King Jr., Langston Hughes and Bill Cosby.

== Political activism ==
=== Anti-Apartheid ===
On July 21, 1979, Gregory appeared at the Amandla Festival in Boston, where Bob Marley, Patti LaBelle, and Eddie Palmieri, among others, performed. Gregory gave a speech before Marley's performance, blaming President Jimmy Carter, and showing his support for the international Anti-Apartheid Movement.

=== Civil rights movement ===
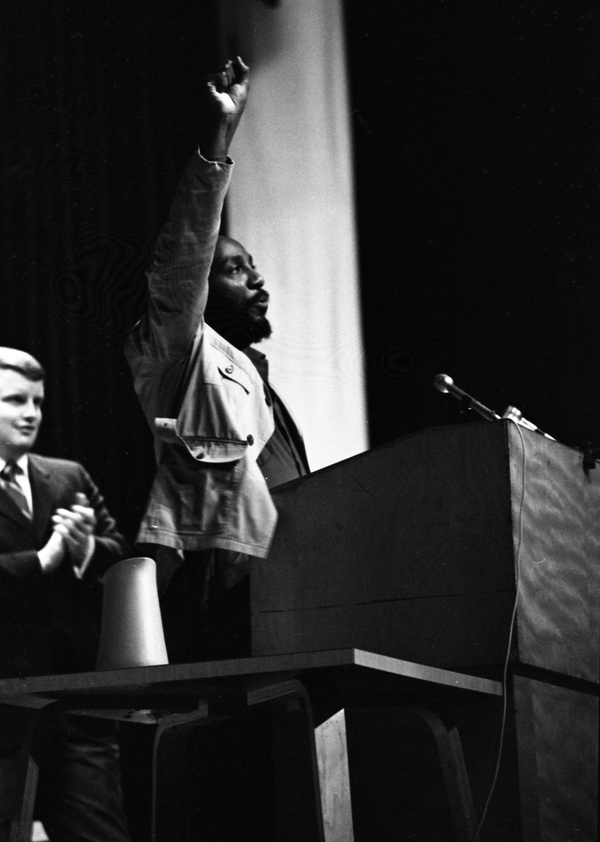
Gregory in 1969 in Tallahassee, Florida, during a civil rights speech

Gregory was active in the civil rights movement. On October 7, 1963, he came to Selma, Alabama, and spoke for two hours on a public platform two days before the voter registration drive known as "Freedom Day" (October 7, 1963).

In 1964, Gregory became more involved in civil rights activities, activism against the Vietnam War, economic reform, and anti-drug issues. As a part of his activism, he went on several hunger strikes and campaigns in America and overseas. In the early 1970s, he was banned from Australia, where government officials feared he would "...stir up demonstrations against the Vietnam war."

In 1964, Gregory played a role in the search for three missing civil rights workers, James Chaney, Andrew Goodman, and Michael Schwerner, who vanished in Philadelphia, Mississippi. After Gregory and members of CORE met with Neshoba County Sheriff Lawrence A. Rainey, Gregory became convinced that the Sheriff's office was complicit. With cash provided by Hugh Hefner, Gregory announced a $25,000 reward for information. The FBI, which had been criticized for inaction, eventually followed suit with its own reward, and the rewards worked. The bodies of the three men were found by the FBI 44 days after they disappeared.

At a civil rights rally marking the 40th anniversary of the Voting Rights Act of 1965, Gregory criticized the United States, calling it "the most dishonest, ungodly, unspiritual nation that ever existed in the history of the planet. As we talk now, America is 5 percent of the world's population and consumes 96 percent of the world's hard drugs".

=== Feminism ===
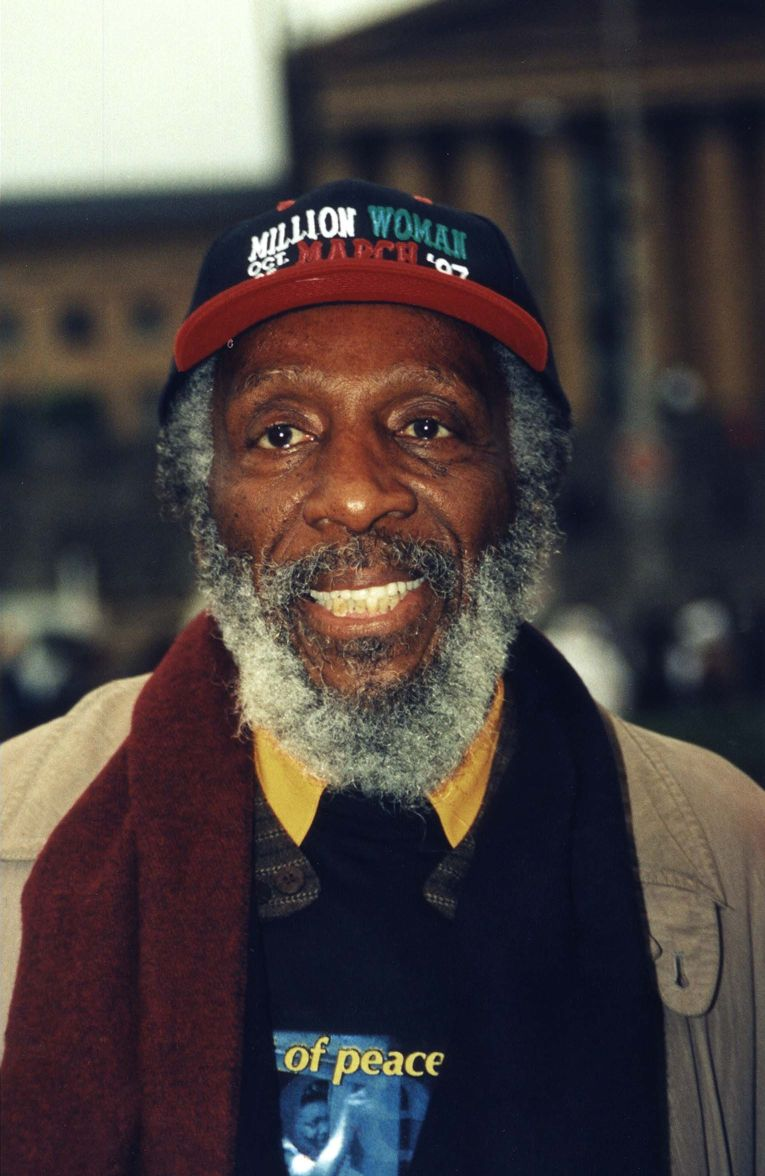
Gregory at the Million Woman March in 1997

Gregory was an outspoken feminist, and in 1978 joined Gloria Steinem, Betty Friedan, Bella Abzug, Margaret Heckler, Barbara Mikulski, and others to lead the National ERA March for Ratification and Extension, a march down Pennsylvania Avenue to the United States Capitol. Gregory was invited to join the march by actress and activist Susan Blakely. There were more than 100,000 on Women's Equality Day (August 26), 1978, to demonstrate for a ratification deadline extension for the proposed Equal Rights Amendment to the United States Constitution, and for the ratification of the ERA. The march was ultimately successful in extending the deadline to June 30, 1982, and Gregory joined other activists to the Senate for celebration and victory speeches by pro-ERA Senators, members of Congress, and activists. The ERA narrowly failed to be ratified by the extended ratification date.

=== JFK assassination ===
Gregory became an outspoken critic of the findings of the Warren Commission concerning the assassination of John F. Kennedy by Lee Harvey Oswald. On February 3, 1975, in Washington, D.C., Gregory introduced photographic forensic investigator Stephen Jaffe and assassination researchers Robert J. Groden and Ralph Schoenman to the members and lawyers for the presidential commission known as the Rockefeller Commission who gave testimony and presented evidence. A month later, on March 6, 1975, Gregory and researcher Robert J. Groden appeared on Geraldo Rivera's late night ABC talk show Goodnight America. An important historical event happened that night when the famous Zapruder film of JFK's assassination was shown to the public on TV for the first time. The public's outraged response to its showing led to the Hart-Schweiker investigation, which contributed to the Church Committee Investigation on Intelligence Activities by the United States, which in turn resulted in the United States House Select Committee on Assassinations investigation.

=== Martin Luther King, Jr. ===
Gregory and Mark Lane conducted research into the assassination of Dr. Martin Luther King Jr., helping move the U.S. House Select Assassinations Committee to investigate the murder, along with that of John F. Kennedy. Lane was the author of conspiracy theory books such as Rush to Judgment. In 1971 the pair published the King conspiracy book Code Name Zorro (later retitled Murder in Memphis), which postulated that convicted assassin James Earl Ray did not act alone.

In 1998, Gregory spoke at the celebration of the birthday of Dr Martin Luther King Jr., with President Bill Clinton in attendance. Not long after, the President told Gregory's long-time friend and public relations consultant Steve Jaffe, "I love Dick Gregory; he is one of the funniest people on the planet." They spoke of how Gregory had made a comment on Dr. King's birthday that broke everyone into laughter when he noted that the President made Speaker Newt Gingrich ride "in the back of the plane," on an Air Force One trip overseas.

=== Other conspiracy theories ===
In the final years of his life, Gregory argued that the Moon landing was faked and the commonly accepted account of the 9/11 attacks was inaccurate, among other conspiracy theories.

=== Native American rights ===
In 1966, Gregory and his wife were arrested for illegal net fishing alongside the Nisqually people in Washington state in a protest fish-in. The tribe was protesting against the state laws that ban forms of fishing other than hook-and-line because it barred their rights guaranteed to them through a federal treaty that allowed them to fish in their traditional ways. He was later released from jail in Olympia, Washington, after six weeks of fasting to call attention to the violation of Native American treaties by the United States government.

In 2015, Gregory revealed that he had criticised Bob Marley for writing the song "Buffalo Soldier" upon meeting him ahead of their joint appearance at the Amandla Festival in 1979. He told Marley it would convey a false image of the Buffalo Soldiers, who were responsible for letting Native Americans starve. Marley had allegedly not been aware of these circumstances when writing the song.

=== US Embassy hostage crisis in Iran ===
Gregory was an outspoken activist during the US Embassy hostage crisis in Iran. In 1980, he traveled to Tehran to attempt to negotiate the hostages' release and engaged in a public hunger strike there, weighing less than 100 pounds (45 kg) when he returned to the United States.

=== Vegetarianism and animal rights ===
Gregory became a vegetarian and fasting activist in 1965, "based on the philosophy of nonviolence practiced during the Civil Rights Movement." His 1973 book, Dick Gregory's Natural Diet For Folks Who Eat: Cookin' with Mother Nature, outlined how fasting and eating vegetarian led to dramatic weight loss. He developed a diet drink called Bahamian Diet Nutritional Drink and went on TV shows to advocate his diet to help the morbidly obese. He wrote the introduction to Viktoras Kulvinskas' book Survival into the 21st Century. A talk he gave at Amherst College in 1986 inspired Tracye McQuirter to become a vegan activist.

In 1984, he founded Health Enterprises, Inc., a company that distributed weight-loss products. With this company, Gregory made efforts to improve the life expectancy of African Americans, which he believed was being hindered by poor nutrition and drug and alcohol abuse. In 1985, Gregory introduced the Slim-Safe Bahamian Diet, a powdered diet compound. He launched the weight-loss powder at the Whole Life Expo in Boston under the slogan "It's cool to be healthy." The diet compound, if drunk three times a day, was said to prompt rapid weight loss. Gregory received a multimillion-dollar distribution contract to retail the diet.

In 1985, the Ethiopian government adopted, to reported success, Gregory's formula to combat malnutrition during a period of famine in the country. Gregory's clients included Muhammad Ali. In 1987, he helped Walter Hudson, then the fattest person alive, lose nearly 680 pounds (310 kg) in the span of one year.

In 2003, Gregory and Cornel West wrote letters on behalf of People for the Ethical Treatment of Animals (PETA) to Kentucky Fried Chicken's CEO, asking that the company improve its animal-handling procedures.

Gregory saw civil rights and animal rights as intrinsically linked, once stating, "Because I'm a civil rights activist, I am also an animal rights activist. Animals and humans suffer and die alike. Violence causes the same pain, the same spilling of blood, the same stench of death, the same arrogant, cruel and vicious taking of life. We shouldn't be a part of it."

== Personal life ==
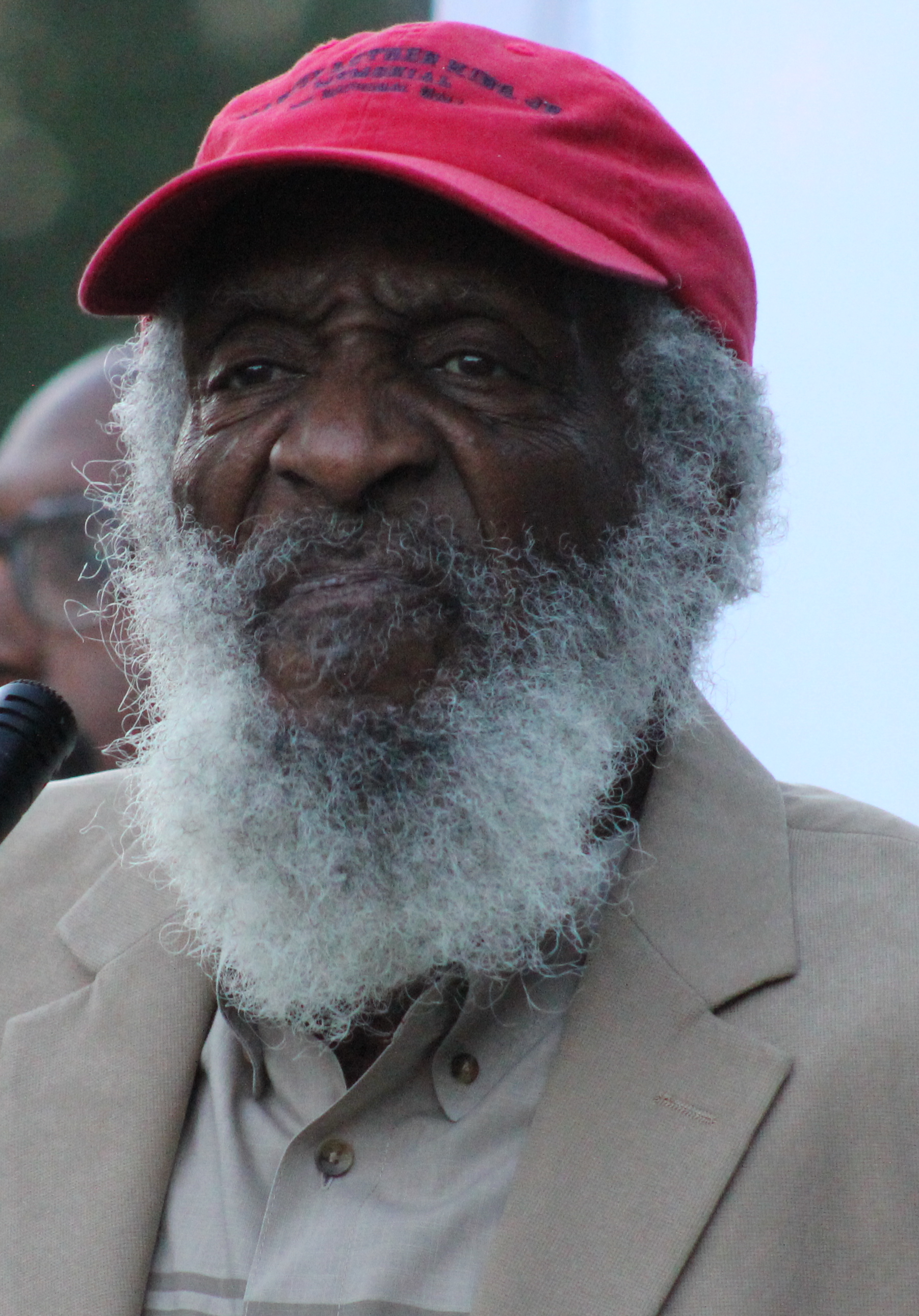
Gregory in 2015

Gregory met his future wife Lillian Smith at an African-American club; they married in 1959. They had 11 children (including one son, Richard Jr., who died two months after birth): Michele, Lynne, Pamela, Paula, Xenobia (Stephanie), Gregory, Christian, Miss, Ayanna, and Yohance. However, it was later acknowledged that Gregory for a long time did not have a close relationship with his family due to his career and activism, and did not spend a significant amount of time with his wife and 10 surviving children. In a 2000 interview with The Boston Globe, Gregory was quoted as saying, "People ask me about being a father and not being there. I say, 'Jack the Ripper had a father. Hitler had a father. Don't talk to me about family.'"

=== Health and death ===
Gregory was diagnosed with lymphoma in late 1999. He said he was treating the cancer with herbs, vitamins, and exercise, which he believed kept the cancer in remission.

Gregory died from heart failure at a hospital in Washington, D.C., on August 19, 2017, at the age of 84. A week prior to his death, he was hospitalized with a bacterial infection.

== Filmography ==
=== Film ===
Year	Film	Role	Notes
1967	Sweet Love, Bitter	Richie 'Eagle' Stokes	Film debut
1995	Panther	Rev. Slocum	
1999	Children of the Struggle	Vernon Lee	
2002	The Hot Chick	Bathroom Attendant	
2009	Steppin: The Movie	Performer	
2014	Ir/Reconcilable	Grandpa	Short
2017	The Leisure Seeker	Dan Coleman	
2024	IMPACT-Dick Gregory	Self	

=== Television ===
Year	Film	Role	Notes
1961-1962	ABC News Close Up	Self	Two episodes
1966	Armchair Theatre	Bill Kingsbury	Episode: "Neighbours"
1968	Rowan and Martin's Laugh In	Guest Performer	Episode: "Guest Star Dick Gregory"
2004	Reno 911!	Blind Pandhandler	Two episodes
2005	Wonder Showzen	Mr. Sun	Episode: "Ocean"
2006	One Bright Shining Moment	Self	Documentary
2008	Comics Unleashed	Self	Two episodes
2017	The History of Comedy	Self	Episode: "One Nation, Under Comedy"
2021	The One and Only Dick Gregory	Self	Showtime documentary film

== Discography ==
- In Living Black and White (1961)
- East & West (1961)
- Dick Gregory Talks Turkey (1962)
- The Two Sides of Dick Gregory (1963)
- My Brother's Keeper (1963)
- Dick Gregory Running for President (1964)
- So You See... We All Have Problems (1964)
- Dick Gregory On: (1969)
- The Light Side: The Dark Side (1969)
- Dick Gregory's Frankenstein (1970)
- Live at the Village Gate (1970)
- At Kent State (1971)
- Caught in the Act (1974)
- The Best of Dick Gregory (1997)
- 21st Century "State of the Union" (2001)
- You Don't Know Dick (2016)

== Bibliography ==
- Nigger: An Autobiography by Dick Gregory, an autobiography written with Robert Lipsyte, E. P. Dutton, September 1964 (reprinted, Pocket Books, 1965–present)
- Write Me In!, Bantam, 1968.
- From the Back of the Bus
- What's Happening?
- The Shadow that Scares Me
- Dick Gregory's Bible Tales, with Commentary, a book of Bible-based humor. ISBN 0-8128-6194-9
- Dick Gregory's Natural Diet for Folks Who Eat: Cookin' With Mother Nature!. ISBN 0-06-080315-0
- (with Shelia P. Moses), Callus on My Soul: A Memoir. 2000, ISBN 0-7582-0202-4
- Up from Nigger (1976)
- No More Lies; The Myth and the Reality of American History (1971)
- Dick Gregory's Political Primer, Harper & Row, 1972. ISBN 9780060116019
- (with Mark Lane), Murder in Memphis: The FBI and the Assassination of Martin Luther King
- (with Mel Watkins), African American Humor: The Best Black Comedy from Slavery to Today (Library of Black America)
- Robert Lee Green, Dick Gregory, daring Black leader
- African American Humor: The Best Black Comedy from Slavery to Today (editor). ISBN 1-55652-430-7
- "Not Poor, Just Broke", short story
- "Defining Moments in Black History: Reading Between the Lies", 2017.

== Cultural references ==
Joe Morton played Gregory in 2016 in the play Turn Me Loose at the Westside Theatre in Manhattan.

A documentary film about the life of Gregory entitled The One and Only Dick Gregory written and directed by Andre Gaines made its world premiere at the Tribeca Film Festival on June 19, 2021, and was released on Showtime television on July 4, 2021. The film was heralded by critics and rated on Rotten Tomatoes with a 100% critics' score.

== See also ==
- Gregory v. City of Chicago
- List of civil rights leaders
- List of peace activists
- Timeline of the civil rights movement
