= Blake Cooper =

American actor

- Born: October 10, 2001 (age 23); Atlanta, Georgia, U.S.
- Occupation: Actor
- Years active: 2012–present

Blake Cooper (born October 10, 2001) is an American actor, best known for playing the role of Chuck in The Maze Runner. Cooper was born in Atlanta, Georgia on a small animal farm. He grew up as a Boy Scout and is well acquainted with animal training.

Cooper was signed to J Pervis Talent Agency by Joy Pervis when he was 10, after being seen performing at a local event. Immediately after signing, Cooper auditioned and landed his first co-star on BET's The Game. Shortly thereafter, he got a callback for the character of Ethan on USA Network's Necessary Roughness where he impressed and entertained the room, which led to booking the role.

In April 2013, Cooper was cast as Chuck in 20th Century Fox's The Maze Runner. Cooper related to the character of 'Chuck' in James Dashner's international bestselling adventure story, The Maze Runner. He contacted Wes Ball through Twitter for the role in the film.

== Filmography ==
=== Films ===
Year	Title	Role	Notes
2012	Parental Guidance	Speech Student	
2014	Prosper	Micah Stubaker	
2014	The Maze Runner	Chuck	
2016	The Late Bloomer	Josh	
2018	Measure of a Man	Bobby Marks	
2020	Chance	Chance Smith	

=== Television ===
Year	Title	Role	Notes
2012	The Game	Young Kid	1 Episode
2012	Necessary Roughness	Ethan	1 Episode
2012	It's Supernatural	Young Shane Warren	1 Episode
2015	Cocked	Xander Paxson	TV Movie
