= List of American films of 2026 =

This is a list of American films that are scheduled for release in 2026.

Following the box office section, this list is organized chronologically, providing information on release dates, production companies, directors, and principal cast members.

== Box office ==
The highest-grossing American films released in 2026, by domestic box office gross revenue, are as follows:

† Background shading and † indicates films currently playing.

Rank	Title	Distributor	Domestic gross
1	Spider-Man: Brand New Day ^{†}	Sony	$958,944,095
2	The Odyssey	Universal	$625,595,435
3	Toy Story 5	Disney	$480,294,461
4	The Super Mario Galaxy Movie	Universal	$429,814,610
5	Michael	Lionsgate	$372,303,388
6	Project Hail Mary	Amazon MGM	$344,050,007
7	Obsession	Focus	$263,451,715
8	The Devil Wears Prada 2	20th Century	$220,556,651
9	Backrooms	A24	$197,523,512
10	Minions & Monsters	Universal	$183,171,260

== January–March ==
Opening		Title	Production company	Cast and crew	Ref.
J A N U A R Y	2	We Bury the Dead	Vertical	Zak Hilditch (director/screenplay); Daisy Ridley, Mark Coles Smith, Brenton Thwaites	
J A N U A R Y	2	The Dutchman	Rogue Pictures / Washington Square Films	Andre Gaines (director/screenplay); Qasim Basir (screenplay); André Holland, Kate Mara, Zazie Beetz, Stephen McKinley Henderson, Aldis Hodge, Lauren E. Banks	
J A N U A R Y	9	Primate	Paramount Pictures	Johannes Roberts (director/screenplay); Ernest Riera (screenplay); Johnny Sequoyah, Jessica Alexander, Troy Kotsur	
J A N U A R Y	9	Greenland 2: Migration	Lionsgate / STXfilms / Thunder Road Films	Ric Roman Waugh (director); Mitchell LaFortune, Chris Sparling (screenplay); Gerard Butler, Morena Baccarin, Roman Griffin Davis	
J A N U A R Y	9	Dead Man's Wire	Row K Entertainment	Gus Van Sant (director); Austin Kolodney (screenplay); Bill Skarsgård, Dacre Montgomery, Cary Elwes, Myha'la, Colman Domingo, Al Pacino	
J A N U A R Y	9	People We Meet on Vacation	Netflix / 3000 Pictures / Temple Hill Entertainment	Brett Haley (director); Yulin Kuang, Amos Vernon, Nunzio Randazzo (screenplay); Emily Bader, Tom Blyth, Sarah Catherine Hook, Jameela Jamil, Lucien Laviscount, Lukas Gage, Alan Ruck, Molly Shannon	
J A N U A R Y	9	Sleepwalker	Brainstorm Media / Appian Way Productions	Brandon Auman (director/screenplay); Hayden Panettiere, Beverly D'Angelo, Justin Chatwin, Mischa Barton, Lori Tan Chinn, Kea Ho	
J A N U A R Y	9	Starbright	Ruby Max Entertainment	Francesco Lucente (director); Joseph Bitonti, Olimpia Lucente (screenplay); Alexandra Dowling, John Rhys-Davies, Diego Boneta, Becky Ann Baker, Ted Levine, Gbenga Akinnagbe	
J A N U A R Y	9	Oscar Shaw	Samuel Goldwyn Films	R. Ellis Frazier, Justin Nesbitt (directors); Don Roff (screenplay); Michael Jai White, Tyrese Gibson, Isaiah Washington, Rich Paul, Cecile Cubiló	
J A N U A R Y	9	OBEX	Oscilloscope / Cartuna / Ley Line Entertainment	Albert Birney (director/screenplay); Pete Ohs (screenplay); Albert Birney, Callie Hernandez, Frank Mosley	
J A N U A R Y	9	Relentless	Samuel Goldwyn Films	Tom Botchii (director/screenplay); Jeffrey Decker, Shuhei Kinoshita	
J A N U A R Y	9	Bulls	Vertical	Daniel Meyer (director/screenplay); Michael Shannon, Matt Trudeau, Daniel Meyer, T. J. Jagodowski, Meir Steinberg	
J A N U A R Y	9	Death Name	Tubi / MarVista Entertainment	Réi (director); Regina Kim (screenplay); Amy Keum, Kevin Woo, Vana Kim, Alice Bang, Andy Han	
J A N U A R Y	9	31 Candles	Level 33 Entertainment	Jonah Feingold (director/screenplay); Jonah Feingold, Sarah Coffey, Caroline Aaron, Djouliet Amara, Seth Barrish, Megan Bitchell	
J A N U A R Y	13	Intrusive Thoughts	Freestyle Digital Media	Saumene Mehrdady (director/screenplay); Sarah Chang Tadayon, Alexander Morales, Angela Barber	
J A N U A R Y	13	The Internship	Paramount Global Content Distribution	James Bamford (director); Steven Paul, J.D. Zeik (screenplay); Lizzy Greene, Megan Boone, Sky Katz, Philip Winchester	
J A N U A R Y	16	28 Years Later: The Bone Temple	Columbia Pictures / DNA Films	Nia DaCosta (director); Alex Garland (screenplay); Ralph Fiennes, Jack O'Connell, Alfie Williams, Erin Kellyman, Chi Lewis-Parry	
J A N U A R Y	16	The Rip	Netflix / Artists Equity	Joe Carnahan (director/screenplay); Matt Damon, Ben Affleck, Steven Yeun, Teyana Taylor, Sasha Calle, Catalina Sandino Moreno, Scott Adkins, Kyle Chandler	
J A N U A R Y	16	Night Patrol	RLJE Films / Shudder	Ryan Prows (director/screenplay); Tim Cairo, Jake Gibson, Shaye Ogbonna (screenplay); Jermaine Fowler, Justin Long, Freddie Gibbs, RJ Cyler, YG, Nicki Micheaux, Flying Lotus, Phil Brooks, Dermot Mulroney	
J A N U A R Y	16	Signing Tony Raymond	Iconic Events Releasing	Glen Owen (director/screenplay); Michael Mosley, Mira Sorvino, Rob Morgan, Marshawn Lynch, Charles Esten	
J A N U A R Y	16	Killer Whale	Lionsgate / Grindstone Entertainment Group	Jo-Anne Brechin (director/screenplay); Katharine E. McPhee (screenplay); Virginia Gardner, Mel Jarnson, Mitchell Hope	
J A N U A R Y	16	Leave	Falling Forward Films	Chris Stokes (director/screenplay); Marques Houston (screenplay); Shalèt Monique, Stephen Barrington, V. Bozeman, Newton Mayenge, LaVell Thompson Jr.	
J A N U A R Y	16	The Confession	Quiver Distribution	Will Canon (director/screenplay); Scott Mechlowicz, Vince Eisenson, Ron Fallica, Zachary Golinger, Jay DeVon Johnson, Craig Kolkebeck, Italia Ricci	
J A N U A R Y	16	Sheepdog	Allen Media Group	Steven Grayhm (director/screenplay); Steven Grayhm, Virginia Madsen, Vondie Curtis-Hall, Dominic Purcell	
J A N U A R Y	16	The Raven	Buffalo 8 / LANY Entertainment / Mannifest Productions	Gregori J. Martin (director/screenplay); Kristos Andrews, Victoria Baldesarra, Mike Manning, Tony Todd, Dante Aleksander, Rae Dawn Chong, William deVry	
J A N U A R Y	23	Mercy	Metro-Goldwyn-Mayer / Atlas Entertainment / Bazelevs Company	Timur Bekmambetov (director); Marco van Belle (screenplay); Chris Pratt, Rebecca Ferguson, Annabelle Wallis, Kylie Rogers, Kali Reis, Chris Sullivan	
J A N U A R Y	23	Return to Silent Hill	Cineverse / Iconic Events Releasing / Davis Films	Christophe Gans (director/screenplay); Sandra Vo-Anh, Will Schneider (screenplay); Jeremy Irvine, Hannah Emily Anderson, Evie Templeton	
J A N U A R Y	23	H Is for Hawk	Roadside Attractions / Film4 / Plan B Entertainment	Philippa Lowthorpe (director/screenplay); Emma Donoghue (screenplay); Claire Foy, Brendan Gleeson, Denise Gough, Sam Spruell, Lindsay Duncan	
J A N U A R Y	23	Clika	Columbia Pictures	Michael Greene (director/screenplay); Sean McBride, Jimmy Humilde (screenplay); JayDee, Concrete, DoKnow, Laura Lopez, Nana Ponceleon, OhGeesy, Percy "Master P" Miller, Peter Greene, Eric Roberts	
J A N U A R Y	23	Dooba Dooba	Dark Sky Films	Ehrland Hollingsworth (director/screenplay); Amna Vegha, Betsy Sligh, Winston Haynes, Erin O'Meara, Billy Hulsey	
J A N U A R Y	23	Mother of Flies	Shudder	John Adams, Zelda Adams, Toby Poser (directors/screenplay); John Adams, Lulu Adams, Zelda Adams, Toby Poser	
J A N U A R Y	23	The Dreamer Cinderella	Atlas Distribution Company / Dr. Ruiz Productions	Alfredo Widman (director); Jose-Luis Ruiz (director/screenplay); Tara Reid, Paul Johansson, Marie Elizabeth DeWitt, Adam Hagenbuch, LisaRaye McCoy	
J A N U A R Y	27	Untitled Home Invasion Romance	Republic Pictures / Motion Picture Corporation of America	Jason Biggs (director); Jamie Napoli, Joshua Paul Johnson (screenplay); Jason Biggs, Justin H. Min, Meaghan Rath, Arturo Castro, Anna Konkle	
J A N U A R Y	28	The Wrecking Crew	Amazon MGM Studios / 6th & Idaho Productions	Ángel Manuel Soto (director); Jonathan Tropper (screenplay); Jason Momoa, Dave Bautista, Claes Bang, Temuera Morrison, Jacob Batalon, Frankie Adams, Miyavi, Maia Kealoha, Stephen Root, Morena Baccarin	
J A N U A R Y	30	Send Help	20th Century Studios	Sam Raimi (director); Mark Swift, Damian Shannon (screenplay); Rachel McAdams, Dylan O'Brien, Edyll Ismail, Xavier Samuel, Chris Pang, Dennis Haysbert	
J A N U A R Y	30	Iron Lung	Markiplier Studios	Mark Fischbach (director/screenplay); Mark Fischbach, Caroline Rose Kaplan, Seán McLoughlin, David Szymanski, Elle LaMont, Troy Baker, Elsie Lovelock	
J A N U A R Y	30	Shelter	Black Bear Pictures / Punch Palace Productions	Ric Roman Waugh (director); Ward Parry (screenplay); Jason Statham, Bodhi Rae Breathnach, Bill Nighy, Naomi Ackie, Daniel Mays	
J A N U A R Y	30	The Moment	A24 / 2AM	Aidan Zamiri (director/screenplay); Bertie Brandes (screenplay); Charli XCX, Rosanna Arquette, Kate Berlant, Jamie Demetriou, Hailey Benton Gates, Isaac Powell, Alexander Skarsgård	
J A N U A R Y	30	Moses the Black	Fathom Entertainment / G-Unit Films and Television Inc. / Cinespace Film Studios	Yelena Popovic (director/screenplay); Omar Epps, Wiz Khalifa, Quavo, Chukwudi Iwuji	
J A N U A R Y	30	World Breaker	Aura Entertainment	Brad Anderson (director); Joshua Rollins (screenplay); Luke Evans, Milla Jovovich, Billie Boullet	
J A N U A R Y	30	Silver Star	Indican Pictures	Ruben Amar, Lola Bessis (directors/screenplay); Grace Van Dien, Troy Leigh-Anne Johnson, Johnathan Davis, Tamara Fruits	
J A N U A R Y	30	Grizzly Night	Saban Films	Burke Doeren (director); Katrina Mathewson, Tanner Bean (screenplay); Charles Esten, Oded Fehr, Lauren Call, Joel Johnstone, Josh Zuckerman, Matt Lintz, Ali Skovbye, Sophia Gray, Brec Bassinger, Jack Griffo	
J A N U A R Y	30	Red Light Teachers	Albea Embestro Soriano	Chris Soriano (director/screenplay); Drea Castro, Chris Soriano, Hillary Soriano, Sarah Channel, Rhandy Torres, Derrick Acosta, Evan Nejad, Victoria Pagnini, Johnny La	
F E B R U A R Y	4	Relationship Goals	Amazon MGM Studios / Franklin Entertainment	Linda Mendoza (director); Michael Elliot, Laura Lekkos, Cory Tynan (screenplay); Kelly Rowland, Method Man, Melanie Leishman	
F E B R U A R Y	5	Still Hope	Fathom Entertainment	Richie Johns (director); Mitch Hudson, Randy McWilson (screenplay); Luna Rivera, Alex Veadov, Wilma Rivera, John D. Michaels, Michelle Hard	
F E B R U A R Y	6	The Strangers – Chapter 3	Lionsgate	Renny Harlin (director); Alan R. Cohen, Alan Freedland (screenplay); Madelaine Petsch, Gabriel Basso, Ema Horvath, Richard Brake	
F E B R U A R Y	6	Solo Mio	Angel Studios / Kinnane Brothers	Chuck Kinnane, Dan Kinnane (directors); James Kinnane, Patrick Kinnane, Kevin James (screenplay); Kevin James, Alyson Hannigan, Kim Coates, Jonathan Roumie, Julee Cerda, Julie Ann Emery	
F E B R U A R Y	6	The President's Cake	Sony Pictures Classics	Hasan Hadi (director/screenplay); Baneen Ahmad Nayyef, Sajad Mohamad Qasem, Waheed Thabet Khreibat, Rahim AlHaj	
F E B R U A R Y	6	Twisted	Republic Pictures / Twisted Pictures	Darren Lynn Bousman (director); James Greer, Jonathan Bernstein (screenplay); Djimon Hounsou, Lauren LaVera, Mia Healey, Alicia Witt, Neal McDonough, Gina Philips, Jacob Lukas Anderson	
F E B R U A R Y	6	The Roaring Game	Brainstorm Media	Tom DeNucci (director/screenplay); Darin Brooks, Fivel Stewart, Eddie Kaye Thomas, William Forsythe, Vanessa Angel, Antwon Tanner, Rob Gronkowski, Paul Johansson, Eric Lutes, Justin Chatwin, Mickey Rourke	
F E B R U A R Y	6	The Huntsman	Epic Pictures Group	Kyle Kauwika Harris (director/screenplay); Judith Sanders, Steven Jon Whrither (screenplay); Shawn Ashmore, Elizabeth Mitchell, Jessy Schram, Garret Dillahunt, Brent Bailey, Maddison Bullock	
F E B R U A R Y	6	F*ck Valentine's Day	Gravitas Ventures / Shout! Studios	Mark Gantt (director); Steve Bencich (screenplay); Virginia Gardner, Jake Cannavale, Skylar Astin, Sabrina Bartlett, Lil Rel Howery, Natasha Leggero, Marisa Tomei	
F E B R U A R Y	6	Teacher's Pet	Quiver Distribution	Noam Kroll (director/screenplay); Luke Barnett, Drew Powell, Sara Tomko, Barbara Crampton, Kevin Makely	
F E B R U A R Y	6	The Dresden Sun	VMI Worldwide / Archetype Pictures	Michael Ryan (director/screenplay); Christina Ricci, Steven Ogg, Linus Roache, Samantha Win, Mena Suvari	
F E B R U A R Y	6	The Infinite Husk	Chroma / Shade Ultra	Aaron Silverstein (director/screenplay); Peace Ikediuba, Cirus-Szalewski, Geena Alexandra, William Thomas Jones, Michael Jon Murphy, Foreste Jean Feely, Jyl Kaneshiro	
F E B R U A R Y	10	Misdirection	Cineverse	Kevin Lewis (director); Lacy McClory (screenplay); Frank Grillo, Olga Kurylenko, Oliver Trevena	
F E B R U A R Y	10	Bad Voodoo	Deskpop Entertainment	Andrew Adler, Andre Hepburn (directors); John Fiore, Manny Perez, Cristina Moody, Charlie Alejandro, Justin Genna, Alex Joseph Pires	
F E B R U A R Y	11	Gale: Yellow Brick Road	Fathom Entertainment	Daniel Alexander (director/screenplay); Chloë Crump, Laura Kay Bailey, Karen Swan	
F E B R U A R Y	13	Wuthering Heights	Warner Bros. Pictures / MRC / LuckyChap Entertainment	Emerald Fennell (director/screenplay); Margot Robbie, Jacob Elordi, Hong Chau, Shazad Latif, Alison Oliver, Martin Clunes, Ewan Mitchell	
F E B R U A R Y	13	Goat	Columbia Pictures / Sony Pictures Animation / Unanimous Media	Tyree Dillihay (director); Aaron Buchsbaum, Teddy Riley (screenplay); Caleb McLaughlin, Gabrielle Union, Aaron Pierre, Nicola Coughlan, David Harbour, Nick Kroll, Jenifer Lewis, Patton Oswalt, Jelly Roll, Jennifer Hudson, Sherry Cola, Eduardo Franco, Andrew Santino, Bobby Lee, Stephen Curry	
F E B R U A R Y	13	Crime 101	Metro-Goldwyn-Mayer / Raw / Working Title Films	Bart Layton (director/screenplay); Chris Hemsworth, Mark Ruffalo, Barry Keoghan, Monica Barbaro, Corey Hawkins, Jennifer Jason Leigh, Nick Nolte, Halle Berry	
F E B R U A R Y	13	Good Luck, Have Fun, Don't Die	Briarcliff Entertainment / 3 Arts Entertainment / Blind Wink Productions / Constantin Film	Gore Verbinski (director); Matthew Robinson (screenplay); Sam Rockwell, Haley Lu Richardson, Michael Peña, Zazie Beetz, Asim Chaudhry, Tom Taylor, Juno Temple	
F E B R U A R Y	13	Joe's College Road Trip	Netflix / Tyler Perry Studios	Tyler Perry (director/screenplay); Tyler Perry, Jermaine Harris, Amber Reign Smith, Bethany Anne Lind, Jeremy Gimenez, Millie Jackson, Wil Deusner, Ms. Pat, Nickolas Wolf	
F E B R U A R Y	13	Cold Storage	Samuel Goldwyn Films / StudioCanal	Jonny Campbell (director); David Koepp (screenplay); Georgina Campbell, Joe Keery, Sosie Bacon, Vanessa Redgrave, Lesley Manville, Liam Neeson	
F E B R U A R Y	13	Honey Bunch	Shudder / Rhombus Media / XYZ Films	Madeleine Sims-Fewer, Dusty Mancinelli (directors/screenplay); Grace Glowicki, Ben Petrie, Jason Isaacs, Kate Dickie	
F E B R U A R Y	13	By Design	Music Box Films	Amanda Kramer (director/screenplay); Juliette Lewis, Mamoudou Athie, Melanie Griffith, Samantha Mathis, Robin Tunney, Udo Kier	
F E B R U A R Y	13	The Mortuary Assistant	Shudder / Epic Pictures Group	Jeremiah Kipp (director); Tracee Beebe, Brian Clarke (screenplay); Willa Holland, Paul Sparks	
F E B R U A R Y	13	Mimics	Panoramic Pictures / Nook Lane Entertainment	Kristoffer Polaha (director); Marc Oakley (screenplay); Kristoffer Polaha, Moriah, Stephen Tobolowsky, Chris Parnell, Jason Marsden, Arianne Zucker	
F E B R U A R Y	17	Hellfire	Saban Films / Diamond Bear Brewing Company	Isaac Florentine (director); Richard Lowry (screenplay); Stephen Lang, Dolph Lundgren, Harvey Keitel, Scottie Thompson, Johnny Yong Bosch, Michael Sirow, Chris Mullinax, Maurice Compte, Levon Panek, Jason Scott Morgan, Carl Bailey, Natalie Canerday	
F E B R U A R Y	17	Kangaroo Kids	Scatena & Rosner Films / Sun Stream Productions	Fairai Richmond (director/screenplay); Ryan Lieske (screenplay); Branscombe Richmond, Robbie Allen, Emily Ashby, Josefina Baeza, Ella Branstetter, Kathleen Kinmont	
F E B R U A R Y	20	I Can Only Imagine 2	Lionsgate / Kingdom Story Company / LD Entertainment / Mission Pictures International	Andrew Erwin (director); Brent McCorkle (director/screenplay); John Michael Finley, Milo Ventimiglia, Sophie Skelton, Arielle Kebbel, Joshua Bassett, Sammy Dell, Trace Adkins, Dennis Quaid	
F E B R U A R Y	20	Psycho Killer	20th Century Studios / Regency Enterprises / Constantin Film / Vertigo Entertainment	Gavin Polone (director); Andrew Kevin Walker (screenplay); Georgina Campbell, James Preston Rogers, Malcolm McDowell	
F E B R U A R Y	20	This Is Not a Test	Independent Film Company / Shudder	Adam MacDonald (director/screenplay); Olivia Holt, Froy Gutierrez, Corteon Moore, Carson MacCormac, Chloe Avakian, Luke Macfarlane	
F E B R U A R Y	20	The Dreadful	Lionsgate	Natasha Kermani (director/screenplay); Kit Harington, Sophie Turner, Marcia Gay Harden, Laurence O'Fuarain, Jonathan Howard	
F E B R U A R Y	20	Lazarus: The Awakening	Samuel Goldwyn Films	Art Camacho (director); Anubis Heru, Sean Riggs, Caroline Roschman (screenplay); Sean Riggs, R. Marcus Taylor, Courtney Grace, Britton Webb, Kiki Haynes	
F E B R U A R Y	20	Redux Redux	Saban Films	Kevin McManus, Matthew McManus (directors/screenplay); Michaela McManus, Jim Cummings, Grace Van Dien, Taylor Misiak	
F E B R U A R Y	20	One Mile	Republic Pictures / Kapital Entertainment	Adam Davidson (director); John Hlavin (screenplay); Ryan Phillippe, C. Thomas Howell, Richard Harmon, Sara Canning, Amélie Hoeferle	
F E B R U A R Y	20	Last Ride	Quiver Distribution	Cinqué Lee (director/screenplay); Roman Griffin Davis, Felix Jamieson, Charlie Price, Kristofer Hivju, Gustaf Skarsgård	
F E B R U A R Y	25	The Bluff	Amazon MGM Studios / AGBO / Cinestar Pictures / Purple Pebble Pictures	Frank E. Flowers (director/screenplay); Joe Ballarini (screenplay); Priyanka Chopra, Karl Urban, Ismael Cruz Córdova, Safia Oakley-Green, Temuera Morrison	
F E B R U A R Y	27	Scream 7	Paramount Pictures / Spyglass Media Group	Kevin Williamson (director/screenplay); Guy Busick (screenplay); Neve Campbell, Isabel May, Jasmin Savoy Brown, Mason Gooding, Anna Camp, David Arquette, Michelle Randolph, Jimmy Tatro, Mckenna Grace, Asa Germann, Celeste O'Connor, Sam Rechner, Mark Consuelos, Tim Simons, Matthew Lillard, Joel McHale, Courteney Cox	
F E B R U A R Y	27	In the Blink of an Eye	Hulu / Searchlight Pictures	Andrew Stanton (director); Colby Day (screenplay); Kate McKinnon, Rashida Jones, Daveed Diggs	
F E B R U A R Y	27	Dreams	Greenwich Entertainment / Freckle Films	Michel Franco (director/screenplay); Jessica Chastain, Isaac Hernández, Rupert Friend	
F E B R U A R Y	27	Undercard	Seismic Releasing / Catalyst Studios	Tamika Miller (director/screenplay); Anita M. Cal (screenplay); Wanda Sykes, Bentley Green, Roselyn Sánchez, Berto Colón, Estella Kahiha, Xavier Mills, William Stanford Davis	
F E B R U A R Y	27	The Napa Boys	Magnolia Pictures	Nick Corirossi (director/screenplay); Armen Weitzman (screenplay); Armen Weitzman, Nick Corirossi, Sarah Ramos, Jamar Neighbors, Steve Agee, Jack Allison	
F E B R U A R Y	27	K-Pops!	Aura Entertainment / Stampede Ventures	Anderson .Paak (director/screenplay); Khalia Amazan (screenplay); Anderson .Paak, Jee Young Han, Jonnie "Dumbfoundead" Park, Soul Rasheed, Yvette Nicole Brown	
F E B R U A R Y	27	Idiotka	Utopia	Natasya Popov (director/screenplay); Anna Baryshnikov, Camila Mendes, Owen Thiele, Benito Skinner, Mark Ivanir, Saweetie, Julia Fox, Galina Jovovich	
F E B R U A R Y	27	Gunfighter Paradise	Waters Film	Jethro Waters (director/screenplay); Jessica Hecht, Valient Himself, Braz Cubas, Joel Loftin, Burk Uzzle	
F E B R U A R Y	27	Operation Taco Gary's	Chroma / Rotten Science / Mosaic	Michael Kvamme (director/screenplay); Simon Rex, Dustin Milligan, Brenda Song, Jason Biggs, Arturo Castro, Tony Cavalero, Doug Jones	
F E B R U A R Y	27	Crazy Old Lady	Shudder	Martín Mauregui (director/screenplay); Daniel Hendler, Carmen Maura	
F E B R U A R Y	27	Matter of Time	ArtAffects / Mediajuice Studios	Jeremy Snead (director/screenplay); Jason Baumgarder, Zach Smith, Sean Wilkie (screenplay); Sean Astin, Myles Erlick, Ali Astin, Jaimie Alexander, Patrick Britton	
F E B R U A R Y	27	Noseeums	Quiver Distribution	Raven DeShay Carter (director/screenplay); Jason-Michael Anthony, Hendreck Joseph (screenplay); Aleigha Burt, Tabitha Getsy, Trisha Arozqueta, Jasmine Nguyen, Jessie Roddy	
M A R C H	3	The Hermit	Uncork'd Entertainment	Salvatore Sclafani (director); William Walkerley (screenplay); Lou Ferrigno, Malina Weissman, Anthony Turpel, Isabelle McCalla	
M A R C H	6	Hoppers	Walt Disney Pictures / Pixar Animation Studios	Daniel Chong (director); Jesse Andrews (screenplay); Piper Curda, Bobby Moynihan, Jon Hamm, Kathy Najimy, Dave Franco, Eduardo Franco, Aparna Nancherla, Tom Law, Sam Richardson, Melissa Villaseñor, Isiah Whitlock Jr., Steve Purcell, Ego Nwodim, Nichole Sakura, Meryl Streep, Karen Huie, Vanessa Bayer	
M A R C H	6	The Bride!	Warner Bros. Pictures	Maggie Gyllenhaal (director/screenplay); Jessie Buckley, Christian Bale, Peter Sarsgaard, Annette Bening, Jake Gyllenhaal, Penélope Cruz	
M A R C H	6	War Machine	Netflix / Lionsgate	Patrick Hughes (director/screenplay); James Beaufort (screenplay); Alan Ritchson, Dennis Quaid, Stephan James, Jai Courtney, Esai Morales, Keiynan Lonsdale, Daniel Webber	
M A R C H	6	Youngblood	Well Go USA Entertainment / Dolphin Entertainment	Hubert Davis (director); Charles Officer, Josh Epstein, Kyle Rideout, Seneca Aaron (screenplay); Ashton James, Blair Underwood, Shawn Doyle, Oluniké Adeliyi, Henri Richer-Picard	
M A R C H	6	Protector	Magenta Light Studios	Adrian Grünberg (director); Bong-Seob Mun (screenplay); Milla Jovovich, Matthew Modine, D. B. Sweeney, Don Harvey, Arica Himmel, Michael Stahl-David	
M A R C H	6	For Worse	Brainstorm Media	Amy Landecker (director/screenplay); Amy Landecker, Bradley Whitford, Nico Hiraga, Missi Pyle, Gaby Hoffmann, Kiersey Clemons, Ken Marino, Claudia Sulewski, Simon Helberg, Liv Hewson	
M A R C H	6	Dolly	Independent Film Company / Shudder	Rod Blackhurst (director/screenplay); Brandon Weavil (screenplay); Seann William Scott, Fabianne Therese, Russ Tiller, Ethan Suplee, Max the Impaler	
M A R C H	6	Storm Rider: Legend of Hammerhead	Blue Harbor Entertainment	Zoran Lisinac, Domagoj Mazuran (director/screenplay); James Cosmo, Caroline Goodall, Billy Barratt, Joey Ansah, Frances Tomelty, Sarah-Sofie Boussnina, Marco Ilsø, Goran Bogdan, Sergej Trifunović	
M A R C H	6	Starstruck	All In Films	Michelle Danner (director); Billy Khoury (screenplay); Billy Zane, Lauren Tom, Catherine Bell, Matthew Daddario, Josh Bowman, David DeLuise	
M A R C H	6	NFT: Cursed Images	Chroma	Jonas Odenheimer (director/screenplay); Najarra Townsend, David Wayman, Mariah Nonnemacher, Durassie Kiangangu, Amelie Edwards	
M A R C H	11	The Optimist	Trafalgar Releasing	Finn Taylor (director/screenplay); Stephen Lang, Elsie Fisher, Luke David Blumm, Leah Pipes, Ben Geurens, Ursula Parker, Slavko Sobin, Stella Stocker, Oskar Hes, Robin Weigert	
M A R C H	13	Reminders of Him	Universal Pictures / Little Engine Productions	Vanessa Caswill (director); Colleen Hoover, Lauren Levine (screenplay); Maika Monroe, Tyriq Withers, Rudy Pankow, Lainey Wilson, Lauren Graham, Bradley Whitford	
M A R C H	13	Slanted	Bleecker Street / Fox Entertainment Studios	Amy Wang (director/screenplay); Shirley Chen, Mckenna Grace, Maitreyi Ramakrishnan, Fang Du	
M A R C H	13	The Gates	Lionsgate	John Burr (director/screenplay); Mason Gooding, Algee Smith, Keith Powers, Jack Snyder, Sofia Hublitz, James Van Der Beek, Brad Leland, Shelby Simmons	
M A R C H	13	Scared to Death	Atlas Distribution / Bald Man Films / Convoke Media / Mirror Films	Paul Boyd (director/screenplay); Lin Shaye, Bill Moseley, Olivier Paris, Victoria Konefal, B.J. Minor, Jade Chynoweth, Rae Dawn Chong, Lucinda Jenney, Kurt Deimer	
M A R C H	13	Bodycam	Shudder	Brandon Christensen (director/screenplay); Ryan Christensen (screenplay); Jaime Callica, Sean Rogerson, Catherine Lough Haggquist, Angel Prater, Keegan Connor Tracy	
M A R C H	13	Mars	Synergetic Distribution	Sevan Najarian (director); Trevor Moore, Zach Cregger, Sam Brown (screenplay); Trevor Moore, Zach Cregger, Sam Brown, Timmy Williams, Darren Trumeter	
M A R C H	17	Preschool	Republic Pictures	Josh Duhamel (director); Richard D'ovidio (screenplay); Josh Duhamel, Michael Socha, Antonia Thomas, Charity Wakefield, Fenella Woolgar, James Cosmo	
M A R C H	17	Capture	Uncork'd Entertainment / 377 Films	Bruce Wemple (director/screenplay); Kaitlyn Lunardi, Cedric Gegel, Chris Cimperman, Grant Schumacher, Leah Eckardt, LeJon Woods	
M A R C H	19	Recollection	Perrsimmon / Paradox Studios	Caden Butera (director/screenplay); Rylan Butera (screenplay); Rosslyn Luke, Falk Hentschel, Cesar Garcia, Eric Roberts, Gary Graham	
M A R C H	20	Project Hail Mary	Metro-Goldwyn-Mayer / Pascal Pictures / Lord Miller Productions / Open Invite Entertainment / Waypoint Entertainment	Phil Lord, Christopher Miller (directors); Drew Goddard (screenplay); Ryan Gosling, Sandra Hüller, James Ortiz, Lionel Boyce	
M A R C H	20	Ready or Not 2: Here I Come	Searchlight Pictures / Mythology Entertainment / Radio Silence Productions	Matt Bettinelli-Olpin, Tyler Gillett (directors); Guy Busick, R. Christopher Murphy (screenplay); Samara Weaving, Kathryn Newton, Sarah Michelle Gellar, Shawn Hatosy, David Cronenberg, Elijah Wood	
M A R C H	20	Do Not Enter	Lionsgate / Suretone Pictures	Marc Klasfeld (director); Stephen Susco, Spencer Mandel, Dikega Hadnot (screenplay); Jake Manley, Adeline Rudolph, Francesca Reale, Laurence O'Fuarain, Nicholas Hamilton, Javier Botet, Kai Caster, Shane Paul McGhie	
M A R C H	20	The Pout-Pout Fish	Viva Pictures	Ricard Cussó, Rio Harrington (directors); Elise Allen, Elie Choufany (screenplay); Nick Offerman, Nina Oyama, Miranda Otto, Jordin Sparks, Amy Sedaris	
M A R C H	20	Vampires of the Velvet Lounge	Strand Releasing	Adam Sherman (director/screenplay); Mena Suvari, Dichen Lachman, Stephen Dorff, Rosa Salazar, Lochlyn Munro, India Eisley, Sarah Dumont, Tyrese Gibson	
M A R C H	20	Ricky	Blue Harbor Entertainment / Ossetra Films / Bay Mills Studios	Rashad Frett (director/screenplay); Lin Que Ayoung (screenplay); Stephan James, Sheryl Lee Ralph, Titus Welliver, Maliq Johnson, Imani Lewis, Sean Nelson	
M A R C H	20	Tow	Vertical / Roadside Attractions	Stephanie Laing (director); Jonathan Keasey, Brant Boivin (screenplay); Rose Byrne, Dominic Sessa, Demi Lovato, Ariana DeBose, Octavia Spencer, Simon Rex, Elsie Fisher, Lea DeLaria, Corbin Bernsen	
M A R C H	20	Wardriver	The Avenue / Star Thrower Entertainment	Rebecca Thomas (director); Daniel Casey (screenplay); Dane DeHaan, Sasha Calle, William Belleau, Karina Gale, Cameron Lee Price, Mamoudou Athie, Jeffrey Donovan	
M A R C H	20	I Live Here Now	Utopia	Julie Pacino (director/screenplay); Lucy Fry, Madeline Brewer, Sarah Rich, Lara Clear, Alex Gaumond, Cara Seymour, Matt Rife, Sheryl Lee	
M A R C H	20	Monument	Bad Hat Harry	Bryan Singer (director); Alena Alova (screenplay); Joseph Mazzello, Jon Voight, Ori Pfeffer	
M A R C H	20	Touch Me	Yellow Veil Pictures	Addison Heimann (director/screenplay); Olivia Taylor Dudley, Lou Taylor Pucci, Jordan Gavaris, Marlene Forte, Paget Brewster	
M A R C H	20	The Cure	Vertical	Nancy Leopardi (director); Jonathan Bernstein, James Greer (screenplay); David Dastmalchian, Ashley Greene, Samantha Cochran, Sydney Taylor, Tyler Lawrence Gray, Alex Veadov	
M A R C H	23	Keep Quiet and Forgive	PBS	Sarah McClure (director, producer)	
M A R C H	24	Crybaby Bridge	X4 Pictures / Cardinal Flix / Without a Net Productions	Sarah T. Schwab (director); Emily Fouraker (screenplay); Sydney Mikayla, Florencia Lozano, Michael Lawrence, Erik King	
M A R C H	24	The Dæmon	Screambox	Matt Devino, David Michael Yohe (directors/screenplay); Tyler Q. Rosen, Adriana Isabel, Sara Fletcher, Nick Searcy, Oscar Wilson	
M A R C H	25	Pretty Lethal	Amazon MGM Studios / 87North Productions	Vicky Jewson (director); Kate Freund (screenplay); Iris Apatow, Lana Condor, Millicent Simmonds, Avantika, Maddie Ziegler, Michael Culkin, Lydia Leonard, Uma Thurman	
M A R C H	27	They Will Kill You	Warner Bros. Pictures / New Line Cinema / Nocturna	Kirill Sokolov (director/screeplay); Alex Litvak (screenplay); Zazie Beetz, Myha'la, Paterson Joseph, Tom Felton, Heather Graham, Patricia Arquette	
M A R C H	27	Mike & Nick & Nick & Alice	Hulu / 20th Century Studios / Mad Chance Productions	BenDavid Grabinski (director/screenplay); Vince Vaughn, James Marsden, Eiza González, Jimmy Tatro, Keith David, Emily Hampshire, Arturo Castro, Lewis Tan, Ben Schwartz	
M A R C H	27	Forbidden Fruits	Independent Film Company / Shudder	Meredith Alloway (director/screenplay); Lily Houghton (screenplay); Lili Reinhart, Lola Tung, Victoria Pedretti, Alexandra Shipp, Emma Chamberlain, Gabrielle Union	
M A R C H	27	Fantasy Life	Greenwich Entertainment	Matthew Shear (director/screenplay); Amanda Peet, Matthew Shear, Alessandro Nivola, Judd Hirsch, Bob Balaban, Andrea Martin, Zosia Mamet, Sheng Wang, Jessica Harper, Holland Taylor	
M A R C H	27	Our Hero, Balthazar	Picturehouse	Oscar Boyson (director/screenplay); Ricky Camilleri (screenplay); Jaeden Martell, Asa Butterfield, Chris Bauer, Jennifer Ehle, Anna Baryshnikov, Noah Centineo, Becky Ann Baker, Avan Jogia	
M A R C H	27	She Dances	EKKL Entertainment / Wavelength	Rick Gomez (director/screenplay); Steve Zahn (screenplay); Steve Zahn, Ethan Hawke, Sonequa Martin-Green, Mackenzie Ziegler, Rosemarie DeWitt, Audrey Zahn	
M A R C H	27	You're Dating a Narcissist!	Brainstorm Media	Ann Marie Allison (director/screenplay); Jenna Milly (screenplay); Marisa Tomei, Sherry Cola, Ciara Bravo, Marco Pigossi, José María Yazpik, Jonah Platt	
M A R C H	27	Refuge	Saban Films / Virgo Films	Anton Sigurdsson (director/screenplay); Adam Sinclair, Donald Paul, Adam Dorsey, Christopher Dietrick	
M A R C H	27	Rockabye	Tubi	Chris Stokes (director/screenplay); Marques Houston, Chaz Echols (screenplay); Annie Ngosi Ilonzeh, Donald Brumfield Jr., Claudia Jordan, Wesley Jonathan, Garret Davis, Cisco Reyes, Lisa Ann Loggins	

== April–June ==
Opening		Title	Production company	Cast and crew	Ref.
A P R I L	1	The Super Mario Galaxy Movie	Universal Pictures / Illumination / Nintendo	Aaron Horvath, Michael Jelenic (directors); Matthew Fogel (screenplay); Chris Pratt, Anya Taylor-Joy, Charlie Day, Jack Black, Keegan-Michael Key, Benny Safdie, Donald Glover, Glen Powell, Luis Guzman, Issa Rae, Kevin Michael Richardson, Brie Larson	
A P R I L	3	The Drama	A24 / Square Peg	Kristoffer Borgli (director/screenplay); Zendaya, Robert Pattinson, Alana Haim, Mamoudou Athie, Hailey Benton Gates	
A P R I L	3	Pizza Movie	Hulu / LD Entertainment / American High	Brian McElhaney, Nick Kocher (directors/screenplay); Gaten Matarazzo, Sean Giambrone, Lulu Wilson, Jack Martin, Peyton Elizabeth Lee, Marcus Scribner, Caleb Hearon, Sarah Sherman, Justin Cooley	
A P R I L	3	A Great Awakening	Roadside Attractions / Sight & Sound Films	Joshua Enck (director/screenplay); Jeff Bender, Jonathan Blair (screenplay); Jonathan Blair, Josh Bates, Stephen Foster Harris	
A P R I L	3	A Love Like This	Quiver Distribution	John Asher (director); Jeffrey Ruggles (screenplay); Emmanuelle Chriqui, Hayes MacArthur, Joyce Bulifant, Ray Abruzzo, Joel Michaely, Danny Jacobs	
A P R I L	3	The Secret Between Us	AMC Theatres / Hidden Gem Entertainment	Tamera Hill (director/screenplay); Michael Jai White, Lisa Arrindell, Victoria Rowell, Karen Abercrombie, Tre Ryan, Denzell Dandridge, Dominique Wilson, Destinee Monét	
A P R I L	3	Premarital	Level 33 Entertainment	Robert Ingraham (director/screenplay); Margaret Bienert (screenplay); Jim O'Heir, Mark Hapka, Kelley Jakle, Meredith Thomas, Igby Rigney	
A P R I L	3	$POSITIONS	Dark Star Pictures	Brandon Daley (director/screenplay); Michael Kunicki, Trevor Dawkins, Kaylyn Carter	
A P R I L	7	Sniper: No Nation	Sony Pictures Home Entertainment / Destination Films	Trevor Calverly (director); Sean Wathen, Michael Frost Beckner, Crash Leyland (screenplay); Tom Berenger, Josh Brener, Chad Michael Collins, Ryan Robbins	
A P R I L	8	Mermaid	Utopia	Tyler Cornack (director/screenplay); Johnny Pemberton, Kevin Nealon, Kirk Fox, Tom Arnold, Robert Patrick, Kevin Dunn	
A P R I L	10	You, Me & Tuscany	Universal Pictures / Will Packer Productions	Kat Coiro (director); Ryan Engle (screenplay); Halle Bailey, Regé-Jean Page, Marco Calvani, Lorenzo de Moor, Aziza Scott, Nia Vardalos	
A P R I L	10	Outcome	Apple TV / Apple Studios	Jonah Hill (director/screenplay); Keanu Reeves, Jonah Hill, Cameron Diaz, Matt Bomer, Cary Christopher, David Spade, Laverne Cox	
A P R I L	10	Thrash	Netflix / Columbia Pictures / Hyperobject Industries	Tommy Wirkola (director/screenplay); Phoebe Dynevor, Whitney Peak, Djimon Hounsou	
A P R I L	10	Faces of Death	Independent Film Company / Shudder / Legendary Pictures / Divide/Conquer / Angry Films	Daniel Goldhaber (director/screenplay); Isa Mazzei (screenplay); Barbie Ferreira, Dacre Montgomery, Josie Totah, Aaron Holliday, Jermaine Fowler, Charli XCX	
A P R I L	10	The Christophers	Neon	Steven Soderbergh (director); Ed Solomon (screenplay); Ian McKellen, Michaela Coel, James Corden, Jessica Gunning	
A P R I L	10	Beast	Lionsgate / ONE Championship	Tyler Atkins (director); Russell Crowe, David Frigerio (screenplay); Russell Crowe, Daniel MacPherson, Luke Hemsworth, Mojean Aria, Kelly Gale	
A P R I L	10	Newborn	AMC Theatres / Mansa Studios / Bron Studios	Nate Parker (director/screenplay); David Oyelowo, Olivia Washington, Barry Pepper, Jimmie Fails	
A P R I L	10	The Yeti	Well Go USA Entertainment	Gene Gallerano, William Pisciotta (directors/screenplay); William Sadler, Heather Lind, Corbin Bernsen, Jim Cummings, Eric Nelsen, Brittany Allen, Elizabeth Cappuccino	
A P R I L	10	Bunnylovr	Utopia	Katarina Zhu (director/screenplay); Katarina Zhu, Rachel Sennott, Perry Yung, Austin Amelio, Jack Kilmer	
A P R I L	10	Heads or Tails?	Samuel Goldwyn Films / Rai Cinema	Alessio Rigo de Righi, Matteo Zoppis (directors/screenplay); Carlo Salsa (screenplay); Nadia Tereszkiewicz, Alessandro Borghi, John C. Reilly, Peter Lanzani, Mirko Artuso, Gabriele Silli, Gianni Garko	
A P R I L	10	PH-1	Buffalo 8 / Like Minded Entertainment	Mark Kassen (director/screenplay); Brent Cote, Cheryl Guerriero (screenplay); Mark Kassen, Abubakar Salim, Dina Shihabi, Vinessa Shaw, Jesse L. Martin	
A P R I L	14	Tamerlane: Rise of the Last Conqueror	Well Go USA Entertainment	Jacob Schwarz (directors); Matthew Greene (screenplay); Christian Mortensen, Mahesh Jadu, Yulduz Rajabova, Joshua Jo	
A P R I L	14	The Highest Stakes	Paramount Global Content Distribution / Republic Pictures	Tony Dean Smith (director); Gary Preisler (screenplay); Seth Green, Kevin Dillon, Charlie Weber, Dylan Walsh, Dan Bucatinsky	
A P R I L	14	Thinestra	Breaking Glass Pictures / Dogplayer	Nathan Hertz (director); Avra Fox-Lerner (screenplay); Michelle Macedo, Melissa Macedo, Norma Maldonado, Brian Huskey, Annie Ilonzeh	
A P R I L	15	Balls Up	Amazon MGM Studios / Skydance Media	Peter Farrelly (director); Rhett Reese, Paul Wernick (screenplay); Mark Wahlberg, Paul Walter Hauser, Molly Shannon, Benjamin Bratt, Daniela Melchior, Eric André	
A P R I L	17	Lee Cronin's The Mummy	Warner Bros. Pictures / New Line Cinema / Blumhouse Productions / Atomic Monster	Lee Cronin (director/screenplay); Jack Reynor, Laia Costa, May Calamawy, Verónica Falcón, Natalie Grace	
A P R I L	17	Mother Mary	A24 / Topic Studios	David Lowery (director/screenplay); Anne Hathaway, Michaela Coel, Hunter Schafer, Atheena Frizzell, Kaia Gerber, Jessica Brown Findlay, Isaura Barbé-Brown, Alba Baptista, Sian Clifford, FKA Twigs	
A P R I L	17	Roommates	Netflix / Happy Madison Productions	Chandler Levack (director); Jimmy Fowlie, Ceara O'Sullivan (screenplay); Sarah Sherman, Natasha Lyonne, Nick Kroll, Sadie Sandler, Chloe East, Storm Reid, Adam Sandler	
A P R I L	17	Normal	Magnolia Pictures	Ben Wheatley (director); Derek Kolstad (screenplay); Bob Odenkirk, Henry Winkler, Lena Headey	
A P R I L	17	Erupcja	1-2 Special / Spartan Media Acquisitions	Pete Ohs (director/screenplay); Charli XCX, Lena Góra, Jeremy O. Harris, Will Madden (screenplay); Charli XCX, Lena Góra, Jeremy O. Harris, Will Madden, Agata Trzebuchowska	
A P R I L	17	Ballistic	Brainstorm Media	Chad Faust (director/screenplay); Lena Headey, Hamza Haq, Amybeth McNulty, Jordan Kronis, Amanda Brugel, Enrico Colantoni	
A P R I L	17	Brothers Under Fire	Vertical	Justin Chadwick (director); Delbert Hancock, Ian Mackenzie Jeffers (screenplay); Kiefer Sutherland, Ashton Sanders, Laura Osma, Solly McLeod, Omar Chaparro	
A P R I L	17	Mabel	Tribeca Releasing / AgX / Wavelength	Nicholas Ma (director/screenplay); Joy Goodwin (screenplay); Lexi Perkel, Christine Ko, Judy Greer	
A P R I L	17	Fireflies at El Mozote	Magenta Light Studios	Ernesto Melara (director/screenplay); Mena Suvari, Jeff Fahey, Paz Vega, Yancey Arias, Juan Pablo Shuk	
A P R I L	17	Busboys	Night	Jonah Feingold (director); David Spade, Theo Von (screenplay); David Spade, Theo Von, Tim Dillon, Bobby Lee, Trevor Wallace, Jay Pharoah	
A P R I L	17	The Whistler	Vertical / Hideout Pictures	Diego Velasco (director); Esteban Orozco, Carolina Paiz, Nacho Palacios (screenplay); Diane Guerrero, Juan Pablo Raba, Indhira Serrano	
A P R I L	17	The Gardener	Area 23a / Sunflower Films	Dabney Day (director/screenplay); David Andrews, William Miller, Radha Mitchell	
A P R I L	17	Mad Bills to Pay (or Destiny, dile que no soy malo)	Oscilloscope / Killer Films	Joel Alfonso Vargas (director/screenplay); Juan Collado, Destiny Checho, Yohanna Florentino, Nathaly Navarro	
A P R I L	20	Weekend at the End of the World	June Street Productions	Gille Klabin (director/screenplay); Clay Elliott, Spencer McCurnin (screenplay); Troian Bellisario, Thomas Lennon, Cameron Fife, Clay Elliott, Sujata Day, Jimmy Guidish, Jesse O'Neill, Adam Ray, Tiffany Smith	
A P R I L	23	Captain Tsunami	Persimmon	Aaron Sherry (director); P.J. Marino (screenplay); Madeleine McGraw, Craig Frank, Tessa Munro, Archie Kao, Jeremy Sisto	
A P R I L	24	Michael	Lionsgate / Universal Pictures / GK Films	Antoine Fuqua (director); John Logan (screenplay); Jaafar Jackson, Nia Long, Juliano Krue Valdi, KeiLyn Durrel Jones, Laura Harrier, Jessica Sula, Mike Myers, Miles Teller, Colman Domingo	
A P R I L	24	Apex	Netflix / Chernin Entertainment / Denver and Delilah Productions / RVK Studios	Baltasar Kormákur (director); Jeremy Robbins (screenplay); Charlize Theron, Taron Egerton, Eric Bana	
A P R I L	24	Over Your Dead Body	Independent Film Company / 87North Productions / XYZ Films	Jorma Taccone (director); Nick Kocher, Brian McElhaney (screenplay); Samara Weaving, Jason Segel, Timothy Olyphant, Juliette Lewis	
A P R I L	24	Desert Warrior	Vertical / MBC Studios / AGC Studios	Rupert Wyatt (director/screenplay); Erica Beeney, Gary Ross, David Self (screenplay); Anthony Mackie, Aiysha Hart, Sharlto Copley, Ben Kingsley	
A P R I L	24	Omaha	Greenwich Entertainment	Cole Webley (director); Robert Machoian (screenplay); John Magaro, Molly Belle Wright, Wyatt Solis	
A P R I L	24	Dirty Hands	Saban Films	Kevin Interdonato (director/screenplay); Patrick Muldoon, Kevin Interdonato, Michael Beach, Denise Richards, Guy Nardulli	
A P R I L	24	The Wolf and the Lamb	Samuel Goldwyn Films	Michael Schilf (director/screenplay); Cassandra Scerbo, Jaydon Clark, Eric Nelson, Angus Macfadyen, Q'orianka Kilcher, Sammi Rotibi, Adrianne Palicki, Zach McGowan, James Landry Hébert	
A P R I L	24	Original Sound	Cromono International	Gregory Jbara (director); Adam Seidel (screenplay); Eric Stoltz, Bridget Moynahan, Laura Marano, David Lambert, Ted King, Roscoe Orman, Luis Antonio Ramos	
A P R I L	24	Broken Bird	Catalyst Studios	Joanne Mitchell (director/screenplay); Dominic Brunt, Tracey Sheals (screenplay); Rebecca Calder, James Fleet	
A P R I L	24	The School Duel	Altered Innocence	Todd Wiseman Jr. (director/screenplay); Kue Lawrence, Christina Brucato, Jamad Mays, Oscar Nunez, Michael Sean Tighe, Hudson Meek	
A P R I L	24	Wasteland Cop	Indican Pictures	Angelo Lopes (director/screenplay); Brendan Guy Murphy, Sian Vilaire, Greg Brown, Joseph Franco, Joel Rowen, Jon Proudstar	
A P R I L	24	Saturnalia	Terror Films / Gearhead Camera	Daniel Lerch (director/screenplay); Julia Nilsen, Darrell Szarka Workman (screenplay); Sophia Anthony, Velvet, Dante Blake, Amariah Dionne, Maddie Siepe, Morgan Messina	
A P R I L	24	Frankie, Maniac Woman	Two Witches Films / The Rancon Company	Pierre Tsigaridis (director/screenplay); Dina Silva (screenplay); Rocío de la Grana, Jordan Kelly DeBarge, Stefanie Estes, Sarah Grace Lee, Daniella Mendoza	
A P R I L	24	His Monster	Compassionate Disaster Films	Erich Cannon (director/screenplay); Nathan D. Lee (screenplay); Gabriel Casdorph, Meranda Long, Ashley Song, Brace Evans	
A P R I L	28	The Step Daddy	Lionsgate Premiere	Thomas J. Churchill (director/screenplay); Vincent M. Ward, Ptosha Storey, Lew Temple, Nick Gomez, Felissa Rose, Sadie Katz, Rusty Coones	
M A Y	1	The Devil Wears Prada 2	20th Century Studios / Wendy Finerman Productions	David Frankel (director); Aline Brosh McKenna (screenplay); Meryl Streep, Anne Hathaway, Emily Blunt, Justin Theroux, Lucy Liu, Kenneth Branagh, Stanley Tucci	
M A Y	1	Animal Farm	Angel Studios / The Imaginarium Studios / Aniventure / Cinesite	Andy Serkis (director); Nicholas Stoller (screenplay); Gaten Matarazzo, Seth Rogen, Kieran Culkin, Woody Harrelson, Kathleen Turner, Iman Vellani, Laverne Cox, Jim Parsons, Andy Serkis, Steve Buscemi, Glenn Close	
M A Y	1	Swapped	Netflix / Skydance Animation	Nathan Greno (director); John Whittington, Christian Magalhaes, Robert Snow (screenplay); Michael B. Jordan, Juno Temple, Tracy Morgan, Cedric the Entertainer, Justina Machado	
M A Y	1	Deep Water	Magenta Light Studios / Arclight Films / Simmons/Hamilton Productions	Renny Harlin (director); Pete Bridges, Shayne Armstrong, S.P. Krause, Damien Power (screenplay); Aaron Eckhart, Ben Kingsley, Angus Sampson, Kelly Gale, Madeleine West, Kate Fitzpatrick, Mark Hadlow	
M A Y	1	Hokum	Neon / Image Nation Abu Dhabi / Tailored Films	Damian McCarthy (director/screenplay); Adam Scott, Peter Coonan, David Wilmot, Florence Ordesh, Will O'Connell, Michael Patric, Brendan Conroy, Austin Amelio	
M A Y	1	One Spoon of Chocolate	36 Cinema Distribution / Variance Films	RZA (director/screenplay); Shameik Moore, Paris Jackson, RJ Cyler, Harry Goodwins, Johnell Young, Michael Harney, Rockmond Dunbar, E'myri Crutchfield, Blair Underwood, Jason Isbell, Isaiah Hill, James Lee Thomas	
M A Y	1	Casa Grande	ESX Entertainment	Juan Pablo Arias Munoz (director/screenplay); Sherell Jackson (screenplay); Lou Diamond Phillips, John Pyper-Ferguson, Bruce Davison, Christina Moore, Lauren Swickard, Kate Mansi, Shalim Ortiz	
M A Y	1	An Autumn Summer	Blue Harbor Entertainment	Jared Isaac (director/screenplay); Lukita Maxwell, Mark McKenna, Louise Barnes	
M A Y	1	The Fuzzies	Terror Films	Josh Funk (director/screenplay); Dustin Vaught (screenplay); Rocío de la Grana, Baylee Toney, Dustin Vaught, Gordy Cassel, Karen Leigh Sharp, Seph Casani	
M A Y	8	Mortal Kombat II	Warner Bros. Pictures / New Line Cinema / Atomic Monster	Simon McQuoid (director); Jeremy Slater (screenplay); Karl Urban, Adeline Rudolph, Jessica McNamee, Josh Lawson, Martyn Ford, Ludi Lin, Mehcad Brooks, Tati Gabrielle, Lewis Tan, Max Huang, Damon Herriman, Chin Han, Tadanobu Asano, Joe Taslim, Hiroyuki Sanada	
M A Y	8	The Sheep Detectives	Metro-Goldwyn-Mayer / Working Title Films	Kyle Balda (director); Craig Mazin (screenplay); Hugh Jackman, Nicholas Braun, Nicholas Galitzine, Molly Gordon, Julia Louis-Dreyfus, Bryan Cranston, Chris O'Dowd, Regina Hall, Patrick Stewart, Bella Ramsey, Brett Goldstein, Hong Chau, Emma Thompson	
M A Y	8	Billie Eilish – Hit Me Hard and Soft: The Tour (Live in 3D)	Paramount Pictures / Lightstorm Earth / Darkroom Films / Interscope Films	James Cameron, Billie Eilish (directors); Billie Eilish, James Cameron, Finneas O'Connell	
M A Y	8	Remarkably Bright Creatures	Netflix / Anonymous Content	Olivia Newman (director/screenplay); John Whittington (screenplay); Sally Field, Lewis Pullman, Joan Chen, Kathy Baker, Beth Grant, Sofia Black-D'Elia, Colm Meaney, Alfred Molina	
M A Y	8	Takeover	Firestorm Entertainment / Quality Control Trioscope	Greg Jonkajtys (director); Jeb Stuart, Brandon M. Easton (screenplay); Quavo, Billy Zane, Serayah, LaMonica Garrett, Martin Sensmeier	
M A Y	8	Couples Weekend	Vertical / Voltage Pictures	Nora Kirkpatrick (director/screenplay); Alexandra Daddario, Daveed Diggs, Josh Gad, Ashley Park	
M A Y	8	Influenced	Brainstorm Media / Menemsha Films	Rachel Israel (director); Jill Kargman, Carol Hartsell, Sean Crespo (screenplay); Jill Kargman, Laura Bell Bundy, Justin Bartha, Eugene Cordero, Clara Wong, Nathan Lee Graham, Christine Taylor, Jessica Capshaw, David Krumholtz, Dan Hedaya	
M A Y	8	Neglected	Inaugural Entertainment	David Lipper (director/screenplay); Nicholas Ferwerda, Adam G. Levine (screenplay); Josh Duhamel, Dylan Sprouse, Elena Sanchez, Til Schweiger	
M A Y	8	Affection	Brainstorm Media	BT Meza (director/screenplay); Jessica Rothe, Joseph Cross, Julianna Layne	
M A Y	8	Blue Film	Obscured Releasing	Elliot Tuttle (director/screenplay); Kieron Moore, Reed Birney	
M A Y	8	Broad Trip	The Roku Channel	Crystal Lowe (director); Chelsea Davison (screenplay); Sophia Bush, Lauren Holly, Steve Guttenberg	
M A Y	8	Give Me Back My Baby	Tubi	Jhayla Mosley (director/screenplay); Bella Chadwick, Robyn Rose, Emory Lawrence, MW Carol, Qunicka Keaton, Hala Mourani, Leslie Mechigian, Kamal Smith	
M A Y	15	Obsession	Focus Features / Blumhouse Productions / Tea Shop Productions	Curry Barker (director/screenplay); Michael Johnston, Inde Navarrette, Cooper Tomlinson, Megan Lawless, Andy Richter	
M A Y	15	Is God Is	Orion Pictures / Viva Maude	Aleshea Harris (director/screenplay); Kara Young, Mallori Johnson, Janelle Monáe, Erika Alexander, Mykelti Williamson, Josiah Cross, Vivica A. Fox, Sterling K. Brown	
M A Y	15	In the Grey	Black Bear Pictures	Guy Ritchie (director/screenplay); Henry Cavill, Jake Gyllenhaal, Eiza González, Kristofer Hivju, Fisher Stevens, Rosamund Pike	
M A Y	15	Driver's Ed	Vertical / AGC Studios	Bobby Farrelly (director); Thomas Moffett (screenplay); Sam Nivola, Sophie Telegadis, Mohana Krishnan, Aidan Laprete, Molly Shannon, Kumail Nanjiani	
M A Y	15	Magic Hour	Greenwich Entertainment / Duplass Brothers Productions	Katie Aselton (director/screenplay); Mark Duplass (screenplay); Katie Aselton, Daveed Diggs, Brad Garrett, Susan Sullivan	
M A Y	15	Forge	Utopia	Jing Ai Ng (director/screenplay); Kelly Marie Tran, Andie Ju, Brandon Soo Hoo, Edmund Donovan, Eva De Dominici, T. R. Knight, Jack Falahee, Sonya Walger	
M A Y	15	An Enemy Within	Saban Films	John Michael Kennedy (director/screenplay); William Moseley, Patrick Baladi, Kim Spearman, Alexander Lincoln, Tristan Gemmill	
M A Y	20	Jack Ryan: Ghost War	Amazon MGM Studios / Paramount Pictures / Sunday Night Productions	Andrew Bernstein (director); John Krasinski, Aaron Rabin (screenplay); John Krasinski, Wendell Pierce, Michael Kelly, Sienna Miller	
M A Y	22	The Mandalorian and Grogu	Lucasfilm / Fairview Entertainment	Jon Favreau (director/screenplay); Dave Filoni, Noah Kloor (screenplay); Pedro Pascal, Jeremy Allen White, Brendan Wayne, Lateef Crowder, Jonny Coyne, Martin Scorsese, Sigourney Weaver	
M A Y	22	Passenger	Paramount Pictures	André Øvredal (director); T.W. Burgess, Zachary Donohue (screenplay); Jacob Scipio, Lou Llobell, Melissa Leo	
M A Y	22	I Love Boosters	Neon / Annapurna Pictures	Boots Riley (director/screenplay); Keke Palmer, Naomi Ackie, Taylour Paige, Poppy Liu, Eiza González, LaKeith Stanfield, Will Poulter, Don Cheadle, Demi Moore	
M A Y	22	Ladies First	Netflix / 3dot Productions	Thea Sharrock (director); Cinco Paul, Katie Silberman, Natalie Krinsky (screenplay); Sacha Baron Cohen, Rosamund Pike, Charles Dance, Emily Mortimer, Tom Davis, Kathryn Hunter, Richard E. Grant, Fiona Shaw	
M A Y	22	Tuner	Black Bear Pictures / Elevation Pictures	Daniel Roher (director/screenplay); Robert Ramsey (screenplay); Leo Woodall, Havana Rose Liu, Lior Raz, Tovah Feldshuh, Jean Reno, Dustin Hoffman	
M A Y	22	Corporate Retreat	Western Film Service / Passage Pictures	Aaron Fisher (director/screenplay); Kerri Lee Romeo (screenplay); Odeya Rush, Zión Moreno, Ashton Sanders, Sasha Lane, Alan Ruck, Rosanna Arquette	
M A Y	22	Giant	Vertical / Balboa Productions / AGC Studios	Rowan Athale (director/screenplay); Amir El-Masry, Pierce Brosnan, Katherine Dow Blyton, Austin Haynes, Arian Nik, Ali Saleh, Ghaith Saleh	
M A Y	22	Situations	Utopia	Greg Vrotsos (director/screenplay); Daniel Hartigan (screenplay); Greg Vrotsos, P.J. Byrne, Melora Walters, Gino Vento, Katie Parker, Fiona Dourif, Fernanda Andrade	
M A Y	29	Backrooms	A24 / North Road Films / 21 Laps Entertainment / Atomic Monster	Kane Parsons (director); Will Soodik (screenplay); Chiwetel Ejiofor, Renate Reinsve, Mark Duplass, Finn Bennett, Lukita Maxwell	
M A Y	29	The Breadwinner	TriStar Pictures / Wonder Project	Eric Appel (director/screenplay); Nate Bargatze, Dan Lagana (screenplay); Nate Bargatze, Mandy Moore, Colin Jost, Zach Cherry, Martin Herlihy, Kumail Nanjiani, Will Forte	
M A Y	29	Power Ballad	Lionsgate / 30West / Screen Ireland / Likely Story	John Carney (director/screenplay); Peter McDonald (screenplay); Paul Rudd, Nick Jonas, Peter McDonald, Marcella Plunkett, Havana Rose Liu, Jack Reynor	
M A Y	29	Miss You, Love You	HBO Films / MWM	Jim Rash (director/screenplay); Allison Janney, Andrew Rannells, Bonnie Hunt, Suzy Nakamura, Oscar Nunez	
M A Y	29	Propeller One-Way Night Coach	Apple TV	John Travolta (director/screenplay); Clark Shotwell, Kelly Eviston-Quinnett, Ella Bleu Travolta, Olga Hoffmann	
M A Y	29	Fucktoys	Trashtown Pictures / Atypical Day	Annapurna Sriram (director/screenplay); Annapurna Sriram, Sadie Scott, Damian Young, Brandon Flynn, François Arnaud, Big Freedia	
M A Y	29	Pitfall	Voltage Pictures	James Kondelik (director); Victor Rose (screenplay); Randy Couture, Richard Harmon, Alexandra Essoe, Jordan Claire Robbins, Matt Hamilton, Stephanie Izsak, Brenna Llewellyn, Michael Ryan	
M A Y	31	Speed Demon	Maverick Film / Complex Corp	Jon Keeyes (director); Domenico Salvaggio (screenplay); Katie Cassidy, William H. Macy, John Patrick Jordan, Sari Arambulo	
J U N E	5	Scary Movie	Paramount Pictures / Miramax	Michael Tiddes (director); Marlon Wayans, Shawn Wayans, Keenen Ivory Wayans, Rick Alvarez (screenplay); Marlon Wayans, Shawn Wayans, Anna Faris, Regina Hall	
J U N E	5	Masters of the Universe	Metro-Goldwyn-Mayer / Mattel Studios / Escape Artists	Travis Knight (director); Chris Butler, Aaron and Adam Nee, David Callaham (screenplay); Nicholas Galitzine, Camila Mendes, Alison Brie, James Purefoy, Morena Baccarin, Jóhannes Haukur Jóhannesson, Charlotte Riley, Kristen Wiig, Jared Leto, Idris Elba	
J U N E	5	Office Romance	Netflix / Ryder Picture Company / Nuyorican Productions	Ol Parker (director); Brett Goldstein, Joe Kelly (screenplay); Jennifer Lopez, Brett Goldstein, Betty Gilpin, Amy Sedaris, Tony Hale, Bradley Whitford, Edward James Olmos	
J U N E	5	Chum	Independent Film Company	Jonathan Zuck (director/screenplay); Joe Leone (screenplay); Alice Eve, Eric Michael Cole, Elle Haymond, Sarah Siadat, Jim Klock	
J U N E	5	Carolina Caroline	Magnolia Pictures / FilmNation Entertainment	Adam Carter Rehmeier (director); William Thomas Dean IV (screenplay); Samara Weaving, Kyle Gallner, Jon Gries, Kyra Sedgwick	
J U N E	5	The Passenger	Vertical / Dark Castle Entertainment / Amasia Entertainment	Vadim Perelman (director); Bennett Fisher (screenplay); Kodi Smit-McPhee, Djimon Hounsou	
J U N E	5	Signal One	Radial Entertainment / Shout! Studios / Darius Films	Jonathan Sobol (director/screenplay); Isabelle Fuhrman, Dennis Quaid, David Thewlis, Josh Hutcherson, Raoul Bhaneja, Stephen Adekolu	
J U N E	5	She's the He	Obscured Releasing	Siobhan McCarthy (director/screenplay); Misha Osherovich, Nico Carney, Suzanne Cryer, Mark Indelicato, Malia Pyles, Emmett Preciado	
J U N E	9	The Second Coming of John Cooper	MVD Entertainment Group / Bonus Level Productions / Public Transit	Kevin Kraft (director/screenplay); Lane Compton, Trevor Goober, Ilana Kohanchi, Dustin Ybarra, Rob Corddry, Brian Posehn, Doug Benson	
J U N E	11	A Mosquito in the Ear	Persimmon / Foothill Productions	Nicola Rinciari (director/screenplay); Jake Lacy, Nazanin Boniadi, Ruhi Pal	
J U N E	12	Disclosure Day	Universal Pictures / Amblin Entertainment	Steven Spielberg (director); David Koepp (screenplay); Emily Blunt, Josh O'Connor, Colin Firth, Eve Hewson, Colman Domingo	
J U N E	12	In the Hand of Dante	Netflix / DreamCrew Entertainment	Julian Schnabel (director/screenplay); Louise Kugelberg (screenplay); Oscar Isaac, Gal Gadot, Gerard Butler, John Malkovich, Sabrina Impacciatore, Martin Scorsese, Al Pacino, Jason Momoa	
J U N E	12	Stop! That! Train!	Bleecker Street / World of Wonder	Adam Shankman (director); Connor Wright, Christina Friel (screenplay); RuPaul, Ginger Minj, Jujubee, Brooke Lynn Hytes, Latrice Royale, Marcia Marcia Marcia, Monét X Change, Symone	
J U N E	12	Find Your Friends	Shudder	Izabel Pakzad (director/screenplay); Helena Howard, Bella Thorne, Zión Moreno, Chris Bauer, Jake Manley, Chloe Cherry, Sophia Ali	
J U N E	12	Honeyjoon	Utopia	Lilian T. Mehrel (director/screenplay); Ayden Mayeri, Amira Casar, José Condessa, António Maria, Tiago Sarmento	
J U N E	12	O Horizon	Variance Films	Madeleine Sackler (director/screenplay); Maria Bakalova, David Strathairn, Adam Pally	
J U N E	12	This Tempting Madness	Vertical	Jennifer E. Montgomery (director/screenplay); Andrew Davis (screenplay); Simone Ashley, Austin Stowell, Suraj Sharma, Mojean Aria, Amol Shah, Zenobia Shroff	
J U N E	12	Broken Land	Well Go USA Entertainment	J.T. Walker (director/screenplay); Christopher Young (screenplay); David Morse, Jaklyn Bejarano, Bill Heck	
J U N E	12	Time of Death	Vertical	Will Wernick (director); Jason Rosen (screenplay); Michael Kelly, Kevin Pollak, Mena Suvari, Dennis Haysbert	
J U N E	16	40 Dates and 40 Nights	Brainstorm Media	Andy Delaney (director); Sarah Howard (screenplay); Bailee Madison, Joel Courtney, Annie Potts, Jai Rodriguez, Jack Schumacher, Luxy Banner, Eric Nelsen	
J U N E	17	Never Change!	Hulu / APT Entertainment / All Things Comedy / American High	Marty Schousboe (director); John Reynolds (screenplay); John Reynolds, Sofia Black-D'Elia, Carmen Christopher, Jo Firestone, Rudy Pankow, Topher Grace, Jackie Cruz, Ana Gasteyer, Patti Harrison, Zach Cherry	
J U N E	17	Black Box	Signature Entertainment / Aura Entertainment	Steven Quale (director); Stephen Susco (screenplay); Tom Brittney, Holly White, Boadicea Ricketts, Betsy-Blue English, Georgi S. Georgiev, Georgina Leonidas	
J U N E	19	Toy Story 5	Walt Disney Pictures / Pixar Animation Studios	Andrew Stanton (director/screenplay); Kenna Harris (screenplay); Tom Hanks, Tim Allen, Joan Cusack, Conan O'Brien, Scarlett Spears, Greta Lee, Shelby Rabara, Mykal-Michelle Harris, Craig Robinson	
J U N E	19	The Death of Robin Hood	A24 / Lyrical Media / RPC	Michael Sarnoski (director/screenplay); Hugh Jackman, Jodie Comer, Bill Skarsgård, Murray Bartlett, Noah Jupe	
J U N E	19	Girls Like Girls	Focus Features / BuzzFeed Studios / Marc Platt Productions	Hayley Kiyoko (director/screenplay); Stefanie Scott (screenplay); Maya da Costa, Myra Molloy, Levon Hawke, Zach Braff	
J U N E	19	Voicemails for Isabelle	Netflix / Escape Artists	Leah McKendrick (director/screenplay); Zoey Deutch, Nick Robinson, Nick Offerman, Lukas Gage, Harry Shum Jr., Ciara Bravo, Megan Danso, Toby Sandeman, Leah McKendrick, Spencer Lord, Gil Bellows	
J U N E	19	Maddie's Secret	Magnolia Pictures	John Early (director/screenplay); John Early, Kate Berlant, Eric Rahill, Kristen Johnston, Claudia O'Doherty, Conner O'Malley, Vanessa Bayer, Chris Bauer	
J U N E	19	Finnegan's Foursome	Republic Pictures	Edward Burns (director/screenplay); Edward Burns, Brian d'Arcy James, Erica Hernández, Brian Muller	
J U N E	19	Color Book	Netflix	David Fortune (director/screenplay); William Catlett, Jeremiah Daniels, Brandee Evans, Terri J. Vaughn	
J U N E	23	Chapter 51	Cineverse	Tyler Shields (director/screenplay); Abigail Breslin, Colman Domingo, Emily Alyn Lind, Charlotte Lawrence, Connor Paolo, Logan Huffman	
J U N E	23	Hold the Fort	Vertigo Releasing	William Bagley (director/screenplay); Chris Mayers, Levi Burdick, Mark Ashworth, Julian Smith	
J U N E	24	Death on the Brandywine	Persimmon	Nick Wilkinson (director/screenplay); Kate Burton, Rena Sofer, Tuc Watkins, Jay Huguley, Walt Willey, Shanley Caswell, Guy Nardulli, Satomi Hofmann	
J U N E	26	Supergirl	Warner Bros. Pictures / DC Studios	Craig Gillespie (director); Ana Nogueira (screenplay); Milly Alcock, Matthias Schoenaerts, Eve Ridley, David Krumholtz, Emily Beecham, David Corenswet, Jason Momoa	
J U N E	26	Jackass: Best and Last	Paramount Pictures / MTV Entertainment Studios	Jeff Tremaine (director); Johnny Knoxville, Steve-O, Chris Pontius, Jason Acuña, Preston Lacy, Dave England, Ehren McGhehey, Zach Holmes, Jasper Dolphin, Eric Manaka, Rachel Wolfson	
J U N E	26	Little Brother	Netflix / The District	Matt Spicer (director); Jarrad Paul, Andrew Mogel (screenplay); John Cena, Eric André, Michelle Monaghan, Christopher Meloni, Ego Nwodim, Sherry Cola	
J U N E	26	The Invite	A24 / Annapurna Pictures / FilmNation Entertainment	Olivia Wilde (director); Rashida Jones, Will McCormack (screenplay); Seth Rogen, Olivia Wilde, Penélope Cruz, Edward Norton	
J U N E	26	Strung	Peacock / Universal Pictures / Peachtree & Vine / Blumhouse Productions	Malcolm D. Lee (director); Alan B. McElroy, Matthew Mixon (screenplay); Chloe Bailey, Lynn Whitfield, Lucien Laviscount, Anna Diop, Coco Jones, Romy Woods	
J U N E	26	Couture	Vertical / Closer Media	Alice Winocour (director/screenplay); Angelina Jolie, Louis Garrel, Ella Rumpf, Garance Marillier	
J U N E	26	The Get Out	Vertical	Derrick Borte (director/screenplay); Daniel Forte (screenplay); Russell Crowe, Kartiah Vergara, Nina Dobrev, Teresa Palmer, Aaron Paul, Luke Evans, Daniel Zovatto	
J U N E	26	Lucky Strike	Roadside Attractions / Saban Films	Rod Lurie (director/screenplay); Marc Frydman (screenplay); Scott Eastwood, Colin Hanks, Aunjanue Ellis-Taylor, Taylor John Smith	
J U N E	26	The Room Returns!	Acting for a Cause	Brando Crawford (director); Tommy Wiseau (screenplay); Bob Odenkirk, Mike Flanagan, Kate Siegel, Bella Heathcote, Arturo Castro, Greg Sestero, Cameron Kasky, Brando Crawford	
J U N E	26	Above the Line	Quiver Distribution	Jeffrey Scott Collins (director/screenplay); Jono Matt (screenplay); Sophia Ali, Cedric the Entertainer, Gregg Henry, Reno Wilson, Jamie Lee, Dylan Playfair, Jackson Pace, John Way	
J U N E	26	Camp	Dark Sky Films	Avalon Fast (director/screenplay); Zola Grimmer, Alice Wordsworth, Cherry Moore, Lea Rose Sebastianis, Ella Reece	
J U N E	26	Jacked	Indican Pictures	John Fucile (director/screenplay); Simon Fraser (screenplay); Marla Robison, Tom Koch, Anthony Cipriani, Wynn Reichert, Kam Perez	
J U N E	26	Sugar Beach	Seismic Releasing / Brace Yourself	Noely Mendoza (director); Zoe Manzotti (screenplay); Zoe Manzotti, Emma Blomquist, Ryley Schroeder, Kelli Garner, Michael Landes	
J U N E	26	Bouchra	Film Movement / Fondazione Prada	Meriem Bennani, Orian Barki (directors/screenplay); Ayla Mrabet (screenplay); Meriem Bennani, Fatim-Zahra Alami, Yto Barrada, Dounia Berrada, Orian Barki, Ariana Faye Allensworth	
J U N E	28	Capps Crossing: Wrong Side of Dead	Lionsgate Premiere	Mike Stahl (director/screenplay); Sabina Gadecki, Garrett C. Phillips, Gary Cooney, Sarah Elizabeth Withers, Mattie Maderos, Shawna Della-Ricca, John Ryan McLaughlin, Kasey Keys, Beverly D'Angelo	

== July–September ==
Opening		Title	Production company	Cast and crew	Ref.
J U L Y	1	Minions & Monsters	Universal Pictures / Illumination	Pierre Coffin (director/screenplay); Brian Lynch (screenplay); Pierre Coffin, Trey Parker, Allison Janney, Christoph Waltz, Jesse Eisenberg, Jeff Bridges, Zoey Deutch, Bobby Moynihan, Phil LaMarr	
J U L Y	1	Enola Holmes 3	Netflix / Legendary Pictures	Philip Barantini (director); Jack Thorne (screenplay); Millie Bobby Brown, Louis Partridge, Himesh Patel, Sharon Duncan-Brewster, Henry Cavill, Helena Bonham Carter	
J U L Y	3	Young Washington	Angel Studios / Wonder Project	Jon Erwin (director/screenplay); Tom Provost, Diederik Hoogstraten (screenplay); William Franklyn-Miller, Mary-Louise Parker, Kelsey Grammer, Andy Serkis, Ben Kingsley	
J U L Y	3	Lockbox	Aura Entertainment / Dark Castle Entertainment	Daniel Stamm (director); Justin Yoffe (screenplay); Carla Gugino, Lou Taylor Pucci, Katharine Isabelle	
J U L Y	3	Swallowtail & Dragonfly	Indican Pictures	Julia Jay Pierrepont III (director/screenplay); Vanessa Yao, Vivian Dawson, Russell Wong, Richard Ouyang, Candace Kita, Jim Lau	
J U L Y	3	Gangland	Saban Films	Vincent Grashaw (director); Zach Montague (screenplay); Lou Diamond Phillips, Nick Stahl, Irene Bedard, Lane Factor	
J U L Y	3	Man of War	Well Go USA Entertainment	William Kaufman (director/screenplay); Paul Reichelt (screenplay); LaMonica Garrett, Andrew Howard, Linds Edwards, Rosmary Yaneva, Jason Patric, Daniel Bernhardt	
J U L Y	10	Moana	Walt Disney Pictures / Seven Bucks Productions	Thomas Kail (director); Jared Bush, Dana Ledoux Miller (screenplay); Dwayne Johnson, Catherine Laga'aia, Rena Owen, John Tui, Frankie Adams, Jemaine Clement	
J U L Y	10	Evil Dead Burn	Warner Bros. Pictures / New Line Cinema / Screen Gems / Ghost House Pictures	Sébastien Vaniček (director/screenplay); Florent Bernard (screenplay); Souheila Yacoub, Tandi Wright, Hunter Doohan, Luciane Buchanan, Erroll Shand, Maude Davey	
J U L Y	10	Gail Daughtry and the Celebrity Sex Pass	Sony Pictures Classics / Likely Story	David Wain (director/screenplay); Ken Marino (screenplay); Zoey Deutch, John Slattery, Ken Marino, Miles Gutierrez-Riley, Ben Wang, Sabrina Impacciatore, Jon Hamm	
J U L Y	10	Night Nurse	Independent Film Company	Georgia Bernstein (director/screenplay); Cemre Paksoy, Bruce McKenzie, Eleonore Hendricks, Colleen Rose Trundy, Mimi Rogers	
J U L Y	10	Westhampton	Obscured Releasing	Christian Nilsson (director/screenplay); RJ Mitte, Finn Wittrock, Tovah Feldshuh, Jake Weary, Ritchie Coster	
J U L Y	10	The Isolate Thief	Radial Entertainment / Hideout Pictures	John Suits (director); Kevin Lefler (screenplay); Sean Bean, Odeya Rush, Mackenzie Foy, Joe Pantoliano, Ty Simpkins, Jack Kesy, Martin Sensmeier	
J U L Y	10	The Floaters	Brainstorm Media	Rachel Israel (director); Brent Hoff, Andra Gordon, Amelia Brain (screenplay); Jackie Tohn, Sarah Podemski, Aya Cash, Judah Lewis, Nina Bloomgarden, Jake Ryan, Seth Green, Jonathan Silverman, Steve Guttenberg, Jacob Moskovitz	
J U L Y	10	Barrio Triste	Film Movement / EDGLRD	Stillz (director/screenplay); Brahian Acevedo, Juan Pablo Baena, Samuel Andrés Celis	
J U L Y	16	Descendants: Wicked Wonderland	Disney Channel / Disney+	Kimmy Gatewood (director); Tamara Chestna, Dan Frey, Ru Sommer (screenplay); Kylie Cantrall, Malia Baker, Leonardo Nam, Liamani Segura, Melanie Paxson, Joel Oulette, Rita Ora, Brandy Norwood, Awkwafina	
J U L Y	17	The Odyssey	Universal Pictures / Syncopy Inc.	Christopher Nolan (director/screenplay); Matt Damon, Tom Holland, Anne Hathaway, Robert Pattinson, Lupita Nyong'o, Samantha Morton, John Leguizamo, Zendaya, Charlize Theron	
J U L Y	17	They Fight	Hulu / Andscape / Mandalay Pictures	Sheldon Candis (director/screenplay); Andrew Renzi (screenplay); André Holland, Wendell Pierce, Samira Wiley, Anthony B. Jenkins, Toissaint Francois Battiste, Mykelti Williamson	
J U L Y	17	Horsegirls	Sumerian Pictures	Lauren Meyering (director/screenplay); Lillian Carrier, Gretchen Mol, Jerrod Haynes, Tony Hale, Matthew Schwab, Iqbal Theba	
J U L Y	17	The Bay	Brainstorm Media	Phil Volken (director/screenplay); Francesca Eastwood, Alexander Wraith, Dani Oliveros, Ta'imua, Calan Scherer, Destiny Benner	
J U L Y	17	Kill Trip	Quiver Distribution	Kristian McKay (director/screenplay); Samaire Armstrong, Corin Nemec, Stelio Savante	
J U L Y	17	Borderline	Vertical	Ryan Jordan (director); Jeffrey Ronald Cohen (screenplay); Oscar Gonzalez, Marcus Jean Pirae, Michael-Eoin Stanney, Marissa Arguijo	
J U L Y	24	Hadestown: The Musical	Crosswalk / LD Entertainment	Brett Sullivan (director); Anaïs Mitchell (screenplay); Reeve Carney, André De Shields, Amber Gray, Eva Noblezada, Patrick Page	
J U L Y	24	Motor City	Independent Film Company / Stampede Ventures	Potsy Ponciroli (director); Chad St. John (screenplay); Alan Ritchson, Ben Foster, Pablo Schreiber, Lionel Boyce, Shailene Woodley	
J U L Y	24	The Dink	Apple TV / Apple Original Films / Red Hour Films	Josh Greenbaum (director); Sean Clements (screenplay); Jake Johnson, Mary Steenburgen, Andy Roddick, Chloe Fineman, Patton Oswalt, Chris Parnell, Aaron Chen, Ben Stiller, Ed Harris	
J U L Y	24	72 Hours	Netflix / Sony Pictures / Davis Entertainment / Hartbeat Productions	Tim Story (director); Jon Hurwitz, Hayden Schlossberg, Kevin Burrows, Matt Mider (screenplay); Kevin Hart, Marcello Hernández, Mason Gooding, Kam Patterson, Ben Marshall, Teyana Taylor	
J U L Y	24	Her Private Hell	Neon	Nicolas Winding Refn (director/screenplay); Esti Giordani (screenplay); Sophie Thatcher, Charles Melton, Havana Rose Liu, Kristine Froseth, Shioli Kutsuna, Aoi Yamada, Dougray Scott, Diego Calva, Hidetoshi Nishijima	
J U L Y	24	Kill Code	Quiver Distribution	Justin Price (director/screenplay); Harvey Keitel, Frank Grillo, Peter Stormare, Tyrese Gibson	
J U L Y	24	Haunted Heist	Variance Films / Saban Films	Lil Rel Howery (director); Carl Reid (screenplay); Lil Rel Howery, Tiffany Haddish, Andrew Bachelor, Karlous Miller, Brett Gelman	
J U L Y	25	Avatar Aang: The Last Airbender	Paramount+ / Paramount Pictures / Nickelodeon Movies / Avatar Studios	Lauren Montgomery (director); Tim Hedrick, Christopher Yost (screenplay); Eric Nam, Dave Bautista, Steven Yeun, Jessica Matten, Román Zaragoza, Dionne Quan, Taika Waititi, Geraldine Viswanathan, Ronny Chieng, Ken Jeong, Dee Bradley Baker, Frieda Pinto, Ke Huy Quan	
J U L Y	28	The Gentleman Thief	Vertical	Ives (director); Chris Sivertson (screenplay); John Travolta, Lukas Haas, Rebecca De Mornay, Sam Asghari, Quavo, DJ Khaled	
J U L Y	29	The Devil's Mouth	Amazon MGM Studios / Lionsgate / Thunder Road Films	Jeff Wadlow (director); Aja Gabel, Myung Joh Wesner (screenplay); Kathryn Newton, Lana Condor, Gavin Casalegno, Nico Hiraga	
J U L Y	29	Above & Below	Aura Entertainment / AF Films / Match Point	Jesse V. Johnson (director); Tony Giordano (screenplay); Laura Marano, Antonio Banderas, Christina Ochoa, Timothy V. Murphy, Louis Mandylor, Jess Liaudin	
J U L Y	31	Spider-Man: Brand New Day	Columbia Pictures / Marvel Studios / Pascal Pictures	Destin Daniel Cretton (director); Chris McKenna, Erik Sommers (screenplay); Tom Holland, Zendaya, Sadie Sink, Jacob Batalon, Jon Bernthal, Florence Pugh, Tramell Tillman, Marisa Tomei, Mark Ruffalo	
J U L Y	31	I Want Your Sex	Magnolia Pictures / Black Bear Pictures	Gregg Araki (director/screenplay); Karley Sciortino (screenplay); Olivia Wilde, Cooper Hoffman, Mason Gooding, Chase Sui Wonders, Johnny Knoxville, Margaret Cho, Roxane Mesquida, Charli XCX, Daveed Diggs	
J U L Y	31	Mustache	Quiver Distribution	Imran J. Khan (director/screenplay); Atharva Verma, Alicia Silverstone, Rizwan Manji, Meesha Shafi	
A U G U S T	1	Soulm8te	Universal Pictures Home Entertainment / Blumhouse Productions / Atomic Monster	Kate Dolan (director/screenplay); Rafael Jordan (screenplay); Lily Sullivan, David Rysdahl, Claudia Doumit	
A U G U S T	7	One Night Only	Universal Pictures / Olive Bridge Entertainment	Will Gluck (director/screenplay); Travis Braun (screenplay); Monica Barbaro, Callum Turner, Maya Hawke, Julia Fox, Molly Ringwald, LeVar Burton	
A U G U S T	7	Super Troopers 3	Searchlight Pictures / Broken Lizard Industries	Jay Chandrasekhar (director); Broken Lizard (screenplay); Jay Chandrasekhar, Kevin Heffernan, Steve Lemme, Paul Soter, Erik Stolhanske, Hannah Simone, Nat Faxon, Chace Crawford, Brian Cox	
A U G U S T	7	The Last House	Netflix / Chernin Entertainment / 3 Arts Entertainment	Louis Leterrier (director); Matthew Robinson (screenplay); Greta Lee, Wagner Moura	
A U G U S T	7	Tony	A24	Matt Johnson (director/screenplay); Matthew Miller, Todd Bartels, Lou Howe (screenplay); Dominic Sessa, Emilia Jones, Dagmara Domińczyk, Rich Sommer, Stavros Halkias, Monica Raymund, Leo Woodall, Antonio Banderas	
A U G U S T	7	Teenage Sex and Death at Camp Miasma	Mubi / Plan B Entertainment	Jane Schoenbrun (director/screenplay); Hannah Einbinder, Gillian Anderson, Jack Haven, Patrick Fischler	
A U G U S T	7	Ice Cream Man	Iconic Events	Eli Roth (director/screenplay); Noah Belson (screenplay); Ari Millen, Benjamin Byron Davis, Karen Cliche, Dylan Hawco, Sarah Abbott	
A U G U S T	7	Late Fame	Magnolia Pictures / Killer Films	Kent Jones (director); Samy Burch (screenplay); Willem Dafoe, Greta Lee, Edmund Donovan	
A U G U S T	7	Attack of the Killer Tomatoes: Organic Intelligence	Anchor Bay Entertainment	David Ferino (director); Costa Dillon, J. Stephen Peace (screenplay); John Astin, Myrna Velasco, Zachary Roozen, Noor Razooky, Dan Bakkedahl, Daniel Roebuck, Paul Bates, Eric Allan Kramer, Samantha Bailey, David Koechner, Eric Roberts, Catherine Corcoran, David Brown, Joshua Poon, Vernee Watson, Tom Arnold	
A U G U S T	7	Olmo	Greenwich Entertainment / Plan B Entertainment	Fernando Eimbcke (director/screenplay); Vanesa Garnica (screenplay); Gustavo Sánchez Parra, Aivan Uttapa, Diego Olmedo, Andrea Suárez Paz, Rosa Armendariz	
A U G U S T	8	Lockjaw	Magenta Edge Films	Sabrina Greco (director/screenplay); Blu Hunt, Colin Burgess, Kevin Grossman, Sally Sum, Nick Corirossi, Ally Davis, Lena Redord	
A U G U S T	13	Camp Rock 3	Disney+ / Disney Channel	Veronica Rodriguez (director); Eydie Faye (screenplay); Joe Jonas, Nick Jonas, Kevin Jonas, Maria Canals-Barrera, Sherry Cola, Liamani Segura, Malachi Barton, Lumi Pollack	
A U G U S T	14	The End of Oak Street	Warner Bros. Pictures / Bad Robot	David Robert Mitchell (director/screenplay); Anne Hathaway, Ewan McGregor, Maisy Stella, Christian Convery	
A U G U S T	14	Don't Say Good Luck	Netflix / Happy Madison Productions	Julia Hart (director/screenplay); Laura Hankin, Jordan Horowitz (screenplay); Sunny Sandler, Melanie Lynskey, Max Greenfield, Jack Champion, Stephanie Beatriz, Bebe Neuwirth, Steve Buscemi	
A U G U S T	14	The Rivals of Amziah King	Black Bear Pictures / Heyday Films	Andrew Patterson (director/screenplay); Matthew McConaughey, Angelina LookingGlass, Jake Horowitz, Scott Shepherd, Rob Morgan, Tony Revolori, Owen Teague, Bruce Davis, Cole Sprouse, Kurt Russell	
A U G U S T	14	The Brink of War	Angel Studios / SK Global	Michael Russell Gunn (director/screenplay); Jeff Daniels, Jared Harris, Hope Davis, Branka Katić, J. K. Simmons	
A U G U S T	14	The Wrong Girls	Neon / Point Grey Pictures	Dylan Meyer (director/screenplay); Kristen Stewart, Alia Shawkat, LaKeith Stanfield, Tony Hale, Zack Fox, Seth Rogen, Kumail Nanjiani, Kate McKinnon, Geena Davis	
A U G U S T	14	Nimrods	Inaugural Entertainment / Live Nation Productions	Lee Kirk (director/screenplay); Mason Thames, Kylr Coffman, Ryan Foust, Mckenna Grace, Jenna Fischer, Angela Kinsey, Fred Armisen, Bobby Lee, Sean Gunn, Green Day	
A U G U S T	14	Union County	Oscilloscope Laboratories / Ley Line Entertainment	Adam Meeks (director/screenplay); Will Poulter, Noah Centineo, Elise Kibler, Emily Meade, Annette Deao	
A U G U S T	14	All Night Wrong	Voltage Pictures	Jason James (director); Jason Filiatrault (screenplay); Zach Cherry, Maria Bakalova, Emily Hampshire, Tyler Labine, Ryan Beil	
A U G U S T	18	Yellow Eyes	Inaugural Entertainment	Jesse Korman (director); Mickey Solis (screenplay); Nena Martins, Michael Kunicki, Jimmy Chung, Brian Rooney	
A U G U S T	21	Insidious: Out of the Further	Screen Gems / Stage 6 Films / Blumhouse Atomic Monster	Jacob Chase (director/screenplay); David Leslie Johnson-McGoldrick (screenplay); Amelia Eve, Brandon Perea, Maisie Richardson-Sellers, Sam Spruell, Island Austin, Lin Shaye	
A U G U S T	21	Mutiny	Lionsgate / MadRiver Pictures / Punch Palace Productions	Jean-François Richet (director); J. P. Davis, Lindsay Michel (screenplay); Jason Statham, Annabelle Wallis, Roland Møller, Adrian Lester	
A U G U S T	21	Spa Weekend	Black Bear Pictures / Team Todd	Jon Lucas, Scott Moore (directors/screenplay); Leslie Mann, Isla Fisher, Michelle Buteau, Anna Faris	
A U G U S T	21	The Magic Faraway Tree	Vertical / Neal Street Productions	Ben Gregor (director); Simon Farnaby (screenplay); Andrew Garfield, Claire Foy, Nonso Anozie, Nicola Coughlan, Jessica Gunning, Jennifer Saunders, Rebecca Ferguson	
A U G U S T	21	It Ends	Neon	Alexander Ullom (director/screenplay); Phinehas Yoon, Akira Jackson, Noah Toth, Mitchell Cole	
A U G U S T	21	Dreams in Nightmares	Lunette Films / Tango Entertainment	Shatara Michelle Ford (director/screenplay); Denée Benton, Mars Storm Rucker, Dezi Bing, Sasha Compère, Charlie Barnett, Molly Bernard, Alfie Fuller, Malek Mouzon, Joss Barton, Jasmin Savoy Brown, Regina Taylor, Robert Wisdom	
A U G U S T	21	Bury the Devil	Brainstorm Media	Adam O'Brien (director); John Petrizzi, Brad Hodson (screenplay); Emmanuelle Lussier-Martinez, Dawn Ford, Bill Rowat	
A U G U S T	25	Cat Cam	X4 Pictures	Sara Werner (director); Hilary Helding (screenplay); Nug the Cat, Cronin Cullen, Colleen Evanson, Bry Gallagher	
A U G U S T	26	The Last Sunrise	Amazon MGM Studios	Carlson Young (director); Anna Klassen (screenplay); Maia Reficco, Fernando Lindez, Eva Longoria, Chloé Sweetlove, Andrés Velencoso, Sabrina Bartlett, Stefanie Martini	
A U G U S T	28	Coyote vs. Acme	Ketchup Entertainment / Warner Bros. Pictures / Warner Animation Group	Dave Green (director); Samy Burch (screenplay); Will Forte, Lana Condor, Tone Bell, Luis Guzmán, Martha Kelly, P.J. Byrne, Eric Bauza, Kenneth Choi, John Cena	
A U G U S T	28	The Dog Stars	20th Century Studios / Scott Free Productions	Ridley Scott (director); Mark L. Smith (screenplay); Jacob Elordi, Josh Brolin, Margaret Qualley, Allison Janney, Benedict Wong, Guy Pearce	
A U G U S T	28	Buddy	Roadside Attractions / Saban Films	Casper Kelly (director/screenplay); Jamie King (screenplay); Cristin Milioti, Delaney Quinn, Patton Oswalt, Clint Howard, Michael Shannon, Topher Grace, Keegan-Michael Key	
A U G U S T	28	The Whisper Man	Netflix / AGBO	James Ashcroft (director); Ben Jacoby, Chase Palmer (screenplay); Robert De Niro, Michelle Monaghan, Adam Scott, Hamish Linklater, Owen Teague, Michael Keaton	
A U G U S T	28	Idiots	Independent Film Company	Macon Blair (director/screenplay); Dave Franco, O'Shea Jackson Jr., Mason Thames, Kiernan Shipka, Nicholas Braun, Peter Dinklage	
A U G U S T	28	The Sun Never Sets	Independent Film Company / Sapan Studio	Joe Swanberg (director/screenplay); Dakota Fanning, Jake Johnson, Cory Michael Smith, Debby Ryan, Karley Sciortino, Lamorne Morris, Anna Konkle	
A U G U S T	28	Legend of the White Dragon	Well Go USA Entertainment	Aaron Schoenke, Sean Schoenke (director/screenplay); Alex Kellerman, Jason David Frank (screenplay); Jason David Frank, Aaron Schoenke, Jason Faunt, Rachele Brooke Smith, Michael Madsen, Andrew Bachelor, David Ramsey, Mark Dacascos	
S E P T E M B E R	2	Fall 2: Deadpoint	Lionsgate / Grindstone Entertainment Group	Peter Spierig, Michael Spierig (directors); Scott Mann, Jonathan Frank (screenplay); Harriet Slater, Arsema Thomas, Tom Brittney, Grace Caroline Currey	
S E P T E M B E R	3	Clash of the Thundermans	Paramount+ / Nickelodeon Movies / Cross Hoge Productions / DWorkingham Productions	Trevor Kirschner (director); Jed Spingarn (screenplay); Kira Kosarin, Jack Griffo, Maya Le Clark, Addison Riecke, Diego Velazquez, Chris Tallman, Rosa Blasi, Ariel Winter	
S E P T E M B E R	4	By Any Means	Paramount Pictures / Hammerstone Studios / Thunder Road	Elegance Bratton (director); Sascha Penn (screenplay); Mark Wahlberg, Yahya Abdul-Mateen II, Nicole Beharie, Giancarlo Esposito, Josh Lucas, David Strathairn, Ethan Embry, LisaGay Hamilton, LaChanze	
S E P T E M B E R	4	Onslaught	A24 / Lyrical Media	Adam Wingard (director); Simon Barrett (screenplay); Adria Arjona, Dan Stevens, Eric Wareheim, Reginald VelJohnson, Michael Biehn, Alex Pereira, Drew Starkey, Rebecca Hall	
S E P T E M B E R	4	Mayday	Apple TV / Apple Studios / Skydance Media / Maximum Effort	Jonathan Goldstein, John Francis Daley (directors/screenplay); Ryan Reynolds, Kenneth Branagh, Maria Bakalova, Marcin Dorociński, David Morse	
S E P T E M B E R	4	Virginia Woolf's Night and Day	Quiver Distribution	Tina Gharavi (director); Justine Waddell (screenplay); Haley Bennett, Timothy Spall, Elyas M'Barek, Lily Allen, Jack Whitehall, Jennifer Saunders, Sally Phillips, John Edward Miller IV	
S E P T E M B E R	4	The Girl in the River	Samuel Goldwyn Films	Brando Benetton (director/screenplay); Tiffany Haddish, Ralph Macchio, Devon Sawa, Maggie Grace	
S E P T E M B E R	4	Come with Me	Vertical	Aaron Harvey (director/screenplay); Jonathan Croom (screenplay); Theo Rossi, Ron Perlman, Kate French, Ronnie Gene Blevins	
S E P T E M B E R	4	Tom and Jerry: Forbidden Compass	Viva Pictures / Warner Bros. Pictures / China Film Co., Ltd.	Zhang Gang (director/screenplay); Li Baixin, Mino Eek, Zhang Gang, Todd Haberkorn, Kyle McCarley, Brent Mukai	
S E P T E M B E R	4	Chronovisor	Grasshopper Film / Cosmic Salon	Jack Auen, Kevin Walker (directors/screenplay); Anne Laure Sellier	
S E P T E M B E R	4	Dark Hollow	Brainstorm Media	Daniel Byers (director/screenplay); June Shreiner, David Garelik, J. Stephen Brantley, Brennon Weese, Ian Deighan, Jonathan Spivey, Sean Michael Wilkinson, Sharon Murray	
S E P T E M B E R	4	American Summer	Blue Harbor Entertainment / Relentless Filmz / Brooklyn Owl Pictures	Michael W. Gray (director/screenplay); Jennifer B. White (screenplay); Steve Guttenberg, Christie Brinkley, Mia Talerico, Dan Lauria, Cullen Moss	
S E P T E M B E R	9	Why Did I Get Married Again?	Netflix / Tyler Perry Studios	Tyler Perry (director/screenplay); Tyler Perry, Taraji P. Henson, Tasha Smith, Michael Jai White, Sharon Leal, Lamman Rucker, Da'Vinchi, Richard T. Jones, Jill Scott	
S E P T E M B E R	10	Practical Magic 2	Warner Bros. Pictures / Alcon Entertainment / Fortis Films / Blossom Films	Susanne Bier (director); Akiva Goldsman, Georgia Pritchett (screenplay); Sandra Bullock, Nicole Kidman, Joey King, Lee Pace, Maisie Williams, Xolo Maridueña, Solly McLeod, Stockard Channing, Dianne Wiest	
S E P T E M B E R	10	The Uprising	Focus Features / Blumhouse Atomic Monster / FilmNation Entertainment	Paul Greengrass (director/screenplay); Andrew Garfield, Jamie Bell, Stephen Dillane, Tom Hollander, Cosmo Jarvis, Thomasin McKenzie, Jonny Lee Miller, Woody Norman, Katherine Waterston	
S E P T E M B E R	11	Runner	Angel Studios	Scott Waugh (director); Miles Hubley and Tommy White (screenplay); Alan Ritchson, Owen Wilson, Rodrigo Santoro, Leila George, Adriana Barraza, Sullivan Stapleton, Peta Sergeant, Geraldine Hakewill	
S E P T E M B E R	11	The Fix	Inaugural Entertainment / Astral Future	Guy Moshe (director/screenplay); Mark Bacci (screenplay); Liam Neeson, Zachary Levi, Annet Mahendru, Grant Harvey, Augusto Aguilera, Elnaaz Norouzi	
S E P T E M B E R	11	If I Go Will They Miss Me	Rich Spirit / Spark Features / Further Adventures	Walter Thompson-Hernández (director/screenplay); J. Alphonse Nicholson, Danielle Brooks, Bodhi Dell, Myles Bullock, Bre-Z	
S E P T E M B E R	11	Daniel and the Fiery Furnace	EKKL Entertainment	Matthew Kooman, Daniel Kooman (directors/screenplay); Mena Massoud, Elijah Alexander, Zaki Ali, Vladimir Angelove, Öncel Camci, Zachary Coffin, Sophia Decaro	
S E P T E M B E R	11	Don't Move	Impractical Studios / Redline Entertainment	Maclain Nelson (director/screenplay); James Murray, Darren Wearmouth (screenplay); Lyndsy Fonseca, Russ, Tom Cavanagh, Hunter King	
S E P T E M B E R	15	The Last Kiss	Universal Pictures Home Entertainment / Blumhouse Atomic Monster	Yoko Okumura (director/screenplay); Krystal Houghton Ziv, Alon Ziv (screenplay); Mckenna Grace, Arkira Chantaratananond, Jaden Michael, Riley Davis	
S E P T E M B E R	16	Run Hide Fight: Infidels	The Daily Wire / Bonfire Legend	Kyle Rankin (director/screenplay); Jonathan Majors, JC Kilcoyne, Stephen Hailo, Tyler Aser, James Bingham, Sharon Johal, Charlotte Delaney Riggs	
S E P T E M B E R	18	Resident Evil	Columbia Pictures / Constantin Film / Davis Films / Vertigo Entertainment / PlayStation Productions	Zach Cregger (director/screenplay); Shay Hatten (screenplay); Austin Abrams, Zach Cherry, Kali Reis, Paul Walter Hauser	
S E P T E M B E R	18	The Weight	Vertical	Padraic McKinley (director); Shelby Gaines, Matthew Chapman, Matthew Booi (screenplay); Ethan Hawke, Russell Crowe, Julia Jones, Austin Amelio, Avi Nash, George Burgess, Alec Newman, Sam Hazeldine	
S E P T E M B E R	18	Tiny Fugitives	Point Grey Pictures / Tango Entertainment / Public House Pictures	Michael Lewen (director/screenplay); Jacob Kaplan (screenplay); Johnny Knoxville, Benjamin Pajak, Aaron Harris, Isa Bernal Steiner, Jai Soundar, Alyssa Gervasi, Blake Anderson, Jay Baruchel	
S E P T E M B E R	18	Best of the Best	Netflix / Rideback	Lena Khan (director); Hasan Minhaj, Prashanth Venkataramanujam (screenplay); Maitreyi Ramakrishnan, Priyanka Kedia, Hasan Minhaj, Saara Chaudry, Lilly Singh, Janina Gavankar	
S E P T E M B E R	18	Bad Apples	Republic Pictures / HanWay Films	Jonatan Etzler (director); Jess O'Kane (screenplay); Saoirse Ronan, Eddie Waller, Jacob Anderson, Rakie Ayola, Robert Emms, Sean Gilder, Kerry Howard	
S E P T E M B E R	18	Without Blood	Brainstorm Media / The Apartment Pictures	Angelina Jolie (director/screenplay); Salma Hayek, Demián Bichir, Juan Minujín	
S E P T E M B E R	18	The Musical	Blue Harbor Entertainment / Variance Films	Giselle Bonilla (director); Alexander Heller (screenplay); Will Brill, Gillian Jacobs, Rob Lowe	
S E P T E M B E R	18	Last Train to Fortune	TriCoast Worldwide / Vitagraph Films	Adam Rifkin (director); Michele Rifkin (screenplay); Malcolm McDowell, James Paxton, Mary Steenburgen, Bernadette Peters, Laura Marano	
S E P T E M B E R	18	Sunny Dancer	Quiver Distribution	George Jacques (director); Bella Ramsey; Neil Patrick Harris, James Norton, Jessica Gunning	
S E P T E M B E R	22	Concessions	Magenta Edge Films	Mas Bouzidi (director/screenplay); Michael Madsen, Steven Ogg, Josh Hamilton, Ivory Aquino	
S E P T E M B E R	23	The Love Hypothesis	Amazon MGM Studios / MRC	Claire Scanlon (director); Sarah Rothschild (screenplay); Lili Reinhart, Tom Bateman, Rachel Marsh, Jaboukie Young-White, Nicholas Duvernay, Arty Froushan	
S E P T E M B E R	23	Take Me Home	Willa / Cinereach / River Road Entertainment	Liz Sargent (director/screenplay); Anna Sargent, Victor Slezak, Ali Ahn, Marceline Hugot, Shane Harper	
S E P T E M B E R	25	Heart of the Beast	Paramount Pictures / Temple Hill Entertainment	David Ayer (director); Cameron Alexander (screenplay); Brad Pitt, J. K. Simmons, Anna Lambe	
S E P T E M B E R	25	Forgotten Island	Universal Pictures / DreamWorks Animation	Joel Crawford, Januel Mercado (directors/screenplay); H.E.R., Liza Soberano, Dave Franco, Jenny Slate, Manny Jacinto, Dolly de Leon, Jo Koy, Ronny Chieng, Kevin McCann, Lea Salonga	
S E P T E M B E R	25	Primetime	A24 / Square Peg	Lance Oppenheim (director); Ajon Singh (screenplay); Robert Pattinson, Merritt Wever, Skyler Gisondo, Phoebe Bridgers, Matthew Maher, Bokeem Woodbine, Anna Faris	
S E P T E M B E R	25	Your Mother Your Mother Your Mother	Orion Pictures	Bassam Tariq (director/screenplay); Mahershala Ali, John Cho, Giancarlo Esposito, Abubakr Ali, Tramell Tillman, Tiffany Boone, Laith Nakli	
S E P T E M B E R	25	Unabomber	Netflix / 2.0 Entertainment / MRC	Janus Metz (director); Sam Chalsen, Nelson Greaves (screenplay); Russell Crowe, Jacob Tremblay, Annabelle Wallis, Shailene Woodley	
S E P T E M B E R	25	Charlie Harper	Row K Entertainment / Temple Hill Entertainment	Tom Dean (director/screenplay); Mac Eldridge (director); Emilia Jones, Nick Robinson, Nicholas Cirillo	
S E P T E M B E R	25	Ha-Chan, Shake Your Booty!	Sony Pictures Classics	Josef Kubota Wladyka (director/screenplay); Nicholas Huynh (screenplay); Rinko Kikuchi, Alberto Guerra, Alejandro Edda, You, Yoh Yoshida, Damián Alcázar	
S E P T E M B E R	25	The Deputy	Well Go USA Entertainment	Matt Sukkar (director); Carlo Bernard (screenplay); Duke Nicholson, Stephen Dorff, Tiffany Haddish, Billie Lourd, Colleen Camp, Julia Fox, Daniel Diemer, William H. Macy	
S E P T E M B E R	25	Long Day's Journey into Night	Quiver Distribution / Brouhaha Entertainment	Jonathan Kent (director); David Lindsay-Abaire (screenplay); Jessica Lange, Ed Harris, Ben Foster, Colin Morgan	
S E P T E M B E R	25	Family	Vertical / Fifth Season	Benjamin Finkel (director/screenplay); Ruth Wilson, Cameron Dawson Gray, Ben Chaplin, Ryan Lucy, Allan Corduner, Beau McConnell	
S E P T E M B E R	25	The Scout	Greenwich Entertainment	Paula González-Nasser (director/screenplay); Mimi Davila, Rutanya Alda, Max Rosen, Ikechukwu Ufomadu, Sarah Herrman, Otmara Marrero, Matt Barats	

== October–December ==
Opening		Title	Production company	Cast and crew	Ref.
O C T O B E R	2	Verity	Metro-Goldwyn-Mayer / Shiny Penny Productions	Michael Showalter (director); Nick Antosca (screenplay); Anne Hathaway, Dakota Johnson, Josh Hartnett, Ismael Cruz Córdova, Brady Wagner	
O C T O B E R	2	Digger	Warner Bros. Pictures / Legendary Pictures	Alejandro González Iñárritu (director/screenplay); Sabina Berman, Alexander Dinelaris Jr., Nicolás Giacobone (screenplay); Tom Cruise, Riz Ahmed, John Goodman, Sandra Hüller, Michael Stuhlbarg, Jesse Plemons	
O C T O B E R	2	Beware Boiúna	Lionsgate / Constantin Film	Mike P. Nelson (director); Alan B. McElroy (screenplay); Kiana Madeira, Jessica Rothe, Logan Marshall-Green	
O C T O B E R	2	Rolling Loud: The Movie	Ketchup Entertainment / Live Nation Productions / American High	Jeremy Garelick (director/screenplay); Owen Wilson, Matt Rife, Christine Ko, Christian Convery, Henry Winkler, Travis Scott	
O C T O B E R	2	Doing Life	Netflix / Tyler Perry Studios	Tyler Perry (director/screenplay); Naomi Baker, Jay Reeves, Tamberla Perry, Karen Obilom, Jasmine Sargent, Lucky Johnson, Danielle Moné Truitt	
O C T O B E R	2	Nickels	Briarcliff Entertainment	Spencer King (director); Tim Tuchrello (screenplay); Rob Riggle, Elizabeth Tulloch, Odessa A'zion, Tom Arnold, Rebecca Gayheart, Vinessa Shaw	
O C T O B E R	2	Appofeniacs	Magenta Edge Films	Chris Marrs Piliero (director/screenplay); Aaron Holiday, Jermaine Fowler, Will Brandt, Paige Searcy, Simran Jehani, Harley Bronwyn, Kellan Rhude, Michael Abbott Jr., Sean Gunn	
O C T O B E R	2	Atonement	Kino Lorber	Reed Van Dyk (director/screenplay); Boyd Holbrook, Hiam Abbass, Kenneth Branagh, Gheed, Yara Bakri, Kalama Epstein	
O C T O B E R	2	Stranglehold	Quiver Distribution	Clark Duke (director/screenplay); Chandler Duke, Billington Garrett (screenplay); Ashley Benson, Jake Lacy, Justin Long, Chandler Duke, Elle King, David Arquette, Brian Posehn, Ron Perlman	
O C T O B E R	2	April X	Rialto Distribution / Vertigo Releasing	Michel K. Parandi (director/screenplay); Jack Coulton (screenplay); Connor Storrie, Lily Krug, Tudor Chirilă, Șerban Pavlu	
O C T O B E R	2	Infirmary	ESC Films / Shudder	Nicholas Pineda (director); Katy Krauland, Nicholas Pineda (screenplay); Paul Syre Lee, Mark Anthony Williams, Danielle Kennedy, Corinna Wagner-Smith	
O C T O B E R	2	Bird in Hand	The Future of Film Is Female / Persimmon	Melody C. Roscher (director/screenplay); Alisha Wainwright, Christine Lahti, James Le Gros, Annabelle Dexter-Jones, Jeffrey Nordling, K. Todd Freeman	
O C T O B E R	7	Love of Your Life	Amazon MGM Studios / Open Invite Entertainment	Rachel Morrison (director); Julia Cox (screenplay); Margaret Qualley, Aaron Pierre, Patrick Schwarzenegger, Gabriel Basso, Catherine Keener	
O C T O B E R	7	Vampire Carnival	Aura Entertainment / Asphyxia AIE	David Charbonier, Justin Douglas Powell (directors); Jason Filardi, Peter Filardi (screenplay); Nell Verlaque, Paulina Chávez, Eoin Macken, Kieron Moore, Jason Isaacs	
O C T O B E R	9	Other Mommy	Universal Pictures / Blumhouse Atomic Monster	Rob Savage (director); Nathan Elston (screenplay); Jessica Chastain, Jay Duplass, Arabella Olivia Clark, Dichen Lachman, Arian Moayed, Karen Allen	
O C T O B E R	9	The Social Reckoning	Columbia Pictures / Alcon Entertainment / The Gotham Group / Escape Artists	Aaron Sorkin (director/screenplay); Mikey Madison, Jeremy Allen White, Wunmi Mosaku, Betty Gilpin, Billy Magnussen, Bill Burr, Jeremy Strong	
O C T O B E R	9	Misty Green	A24	Chris Rock (director/screenplay); Rosalind Eleazar, Adam Driver, Daniel Kaluuya, Anna Kendrick, Topher Grace, Chris Rock	
O C T O B E R	9	Matchbox: The Movie	Apple TV / Apple Studios / Skydance Media / Mattel Studios	Sam Hargrave (director); David Coggeshall, Jonathan Tropper (screenplay); John Cena, Jessica Biel, Sam Richardson, Arturo Castro, Teyonah Parris, Randeep Hooda, Danai Gurira, Corey Stoll, Golshifteh Farahani, Bill Camp	
O C T O B E R	9	Animals	Netflix / Artists Equity / Fifth Season	Ben Affleck (director/screenplay); Connor O. Mclntyre, Billy Ray (screenplay); Ben Affleck, Kerry Washington, Gillian Anderson, Adriana Paz, Ray Fisher, Luis Gerardo Méndez, Steven Yeun	
O C T O B E R	9	Tenzing	Apple Original Films / Apple Studios / See-Saw Films	Jennifer Peedom (director); Luke Davies (screenplay); Genden Phuntsok, Tom Hiddleston, Willem Dafoe, Caitríona Balfe	
O C T O B E R	9	California Schemin'	Magenta Light Studios	James McAvoy (director); Elaine Gracie, Archie Thomson (screenplay); Séamus McLean Ross, Samuel Bottomley, Lucy Halliday, Rebekah Murrell, James McAvoy	
O C T O B E R	9	The Beast	Aura Entertainment / Film 44 / Fifth Season	Renny Harlin (director); Umair Aleem (screenplay); Samuel L. Jackson, Joel Kinnaman, Colin Morgan, Guy Burnet	
O C T O B E R	9	Angel and the Badman	Angel Studios	Julio Quintana (director); Jaime Hernandez, Kevin M. Townsend, Christopher Tuffin (screenplay); Zachary Levi, Neal McDonough, Tommy Lee Jones	
O C T O B E R	9	Falling	Brainstorm Media	Colin Krisel, James Krisel (directors/screenplay); KJ Apa, Isabel May, Archie Renaux, Emma Laird, Sophie Simnett, Nick Hendrix	
O C T O B E R	9	The Florist	Saban Films	Babak Najafi (director); Eran Creevy, Scott Windhauser (screenplay); Jean Reno, Dennis Quaid, Sky Katz	
O C T O B E R	9	Double Trouble	Warner Bros. Home Entertainment / ESX Entertainment	Shaun Piccinino (director); John Ducey (screenplay); Violet McGraw, Madeleine McGraw, Andrew Koji, Struggle Jennings	
O C T O B E R	13	Let's Have Kids!	Republic Pictures / MRC	Adam Sztykiel (director/screenplay); Ellie Knaus (screenplay); Karen Gillan, Zoë Chao, Sam Richardson, Max Greenfield, KJ Apa, Ed Begley Jr., Mary Steenburgen	
O C T O B E R	13	Bunker Heights	MVD Entertainment Group	Drew Fortier (director/screenplay); Drew Fortier, Hannah Fierman, Chaney Morrow, Paul T. Taylor, Floyd Ewing Jr., Violent J, Vinnie Dombroski, David Ellefson	
O C T O B E R	13	Devour	Epic Pictures Group	Scott B. Hansen (director); Desiree Hansen (screenplay); Katelynn E. Newberry, Gus Langley, Alexandra Lucchesi, Chelsea LeSage, Gaven Wilde, Heidi Shepherd	
O C T O B E R	16	Street Fighter	Paramount Pictures / Legendary Pictures	Kitao Sakurai (director/screenplay); T. J. Fixman (screenplay); Noah Centineo, Andrew Koji, Callina Liang, Joe "Roman Reigns" Anoa'i, David Dastmalchian, Cody Rhodes, Eric André, Andrew Schulz, Vidyut Jammwal, Orville Peck, Don Lee, Curtis "50 Cent" Jackson, Jason Momoa	
O C T O B E R	16	Whalefall	20th Century Studios / Imagine Entertainment	Brian Duffield (director/screenplay); Daniel Kraus (screenplay); Austin Abrams, Josh Brolin, Elisabeth Shue, John Ortiz	
O C T O B E R	16	Sense and Sensibility	Focus Features / Working Title Films	Georgia Oakley (director); Diana Reid (screenplay); Daisy Edgar-Jones, Esmé Creed-Miles, Caitríona Balfe, Bodhi Rae Breathnach, Frank Dillane, Herbert Nordrum, George MacKay, Fiona Shaw	
O C T O B E R	16	The Only Living Pickpocket in New York	Sony Pictures Classics / MRC / T-Street Productions	Noah Segan (director/screenplay); John Turturro, Giancarlo Esposito, Will Price, Tatiana Maslany, Victoria Moroles, Steve Buscemi	
O C T O B E R	16	Sacrifice	Netflix / Film4 Productions	Romain Gavras (director/screenplay); Will Arbery (screenplay); Chris Evans, Anya Taylor-Joy, Vincent Cassel, Sam Richardson, John Malkovich, Salma Hayek	
O C T O B E R	16	Clean Hands	Vertical	Jake Allyn (director/screenplay); Zach Braff, Esther McGregor, Holt McCallany, Abigail Spencer, Lucas Till	
O C T O B E R	16	Crawlers	Roadside Attractions / Saban Films / Thunder Road Films	Angel Gómez Hernandez (director); Jayson Rothwell (screenplay); Matilda Lutz, Gregg Sulkin, Melina Matthews, William Miller	
O C T O B E R	16	DreamQuil	Republic Pictures / Brownstone Productions / Big Valley Pictures	Alex Prager (director/screenplay); Vanessa Prager (screenplay); Elizabeth Banks, John C. Reilly, Sofia Boutella, Juliette Lewis, Kathryn Newton	
O C T O B E R	16	Trust Me, I'm a Doctor	Briarcliff Entertainment	Thane Economou (director/screenplay); Kal Penn, Abbie Cornish, Linda Hamilton	
O C T O B E R	16	Hallowarrior	Shudder	Ben Sottak (director/screenplay); Milly Shapiro, Ajani Russell, A. J. Bowen, Shannyn Sossamon	
O C T O B E R	16	One Eye Open	BayView Entertainment	Michael D. Coffey (director/screenplay); Kusi Beauchanp, Chris Bylsma, Addison Landes, RJ Mitte	
O C T O B E R	23	Clayface	Warner Bros. Pictures / DC Studios / 6th & Idaho Productions	James Watkins (director); Mike Flanagan, Hossein Amini (screenplay); Tom Rhys Harries, Naomi Ackie, David Dencik, Max Minghella, Eddie Marsan	
O C T O B E R	23	Wildwood	Fathom Entertainment / Laika	Travis Knight (director); Chris Butler (screenplay); Carey Mulligan, Peyton Elizabeth Lee, Jacob Tremblay, Richard E. Grant, Awkwafina, Amandla Stenberg, Tom Waits, Charlie Day, Blythe Danner, Arthur Knight, Angela Bassett, Mahershala Ali	
O C T O B E R	23	Klara and the Sun	Columbia Pictures / 3000 Pictures / Spyglass Media Group / Heyday Films / Piki Films	Taika Waititi (director/screenplay); Dahvi Waller (screenplay); Jenna Ortega, Amy Adams, Mia Tharia, Aran Murphy, Steve Buscemi, Natasha Lyonne	
O C T O B E R	23	Wicker	Black Bear Pictures / Tango Entertainment / Topic Studios	Alex Huston Fischer, Eleanor Wilson (directors/screenplay); Olivia Colman, Alexander Skarsgård, Elizabeth Debicki, Marli Siu, Nabhaan Rizwan, Richard E. Grant, Peter Dinklage	
O C T O B E R	23	Possible Love	Netflix / Anonymous Content	Lee Chang-dong (directors/screenplay); Oh Jung-mi (screenplay); Jeon Do-yeon, Sul Kyung-gu, Zo In-sung, Cho Yeo-jeong	
O C T O B E R	23	Love Language	Vertical / 3 Arts Entertainment	Joey Power (director/screenplay); Chloë Grace Moretz, Anthony Ramos, Manny Jacinto, Isabel May, Lukas Gage, Chloe Fineman, Billie Lourd	
O C T O B E R	23	Junk	Mubi / Protozoa Pictures	Jack Begert (director/screenplay); Dani Goffstein (screenplay); David Schwimmer, Gaby Hoffmann, Dominic Fike, Talia Ryder, Karl Glusman, Chase Sui Wonders, Jena Malone, Sante Bentivoglio	
O C T O B E R	23	Terrestrial	Aero Films	Steve Pink (director); Samuel Johnson, Connor Diedrich (screenplay); Jermaine Fowler, James Morosini, Pauline Chalamet, Rob Yang, Brendan Hunt, Edy Modica	
O C T O B E R	23	The Cycle	Shudder / Tea Shop Productions	Jordan Downey (director/screenplay); Kevin Stewart (screenplay); Deborah Ann Woll, Jeffrey Donovan, Gretchen Corbett, Phillip Andre Botello, Will Hochman	
O C T O B E R	23	Seniors	Collide Distribution	Lance Clark (director); Erica Leigh Dick (screenplay); John Rhys-Davies, Eric Mendenhall, Sophia Echendu, Paris Brosnan, Bethany Anne Lind, Tyler Toney	
O C T O B E R	28	Breeder	Independent Film Company / Shudder	Alex Goyette (director/screenplay); Daniel Doheny, Dot-Marie Jones, Maddie Phillips, Tanaya Beatty	
O C T O B E R	30	The Mosquito Bowl	Netflix / Imagine Entertainment	Peter Berg (director/screenplay); Mark L. Smith (screenplay); Nicholas Galitzine, Bill Skarsgård, Ray Nicholson, Tom Francis, Brent Comer	
O C T O B E R	30	Christmas at the Kringles	Briarcliff Entertainment	Kevin Lewis (director); Zack Imbrogno (screenplay); Ron Livingston, Rachel Bilson, Rob Riggle, Arden Myrin, Donald Faison, Thomas Lennon	
O C T O B E R	30	The Mongoose	Samuel Goldwyn Films	Mark Vanselow (director); Thompson Evans (screenplay); Liam Neeson, Marisa Tomei, Ving Rhames, Michael Chiklis	
O C T O B E R	30	Queen at Sea	Greenwich Entertainment	Lance Hammer (director/screenplay); Juliette Binoche, Tom Courtenay, Anna Calder-Marshall, Steven Cree, Florence Hunt, Cody Molko	
O C T O B E R	30	Stiletto	The Horror Section	Samuel Gonzales Jr. (director/screenplay); Gigi Gustin (screenplay); Gigi Gustin, Charlotte McKinney, Colleen Camp, Meghan Carrasquillo, Stephen Blackehart	
O C T O B E R	30	The Canvas	Vertical	John Real (director/screenplay); Adriana Marzagalli (screenplay); Angus Macfadyen, John Real, Nicolette McKeown, Sabrina Culver, Francesco Marzagalli	
N O V E M B E R	3	The Holiday Hitman	Saban Films	Bradley Stryker (director/screenplay); Charley McDougal (screenplay); Nick Sagar, Ricky Norwood, Alexa Adeosun, Julio Cesar Cedillo, Adam Korson, Montana Manning	
N O V E M B E R	4	A Dog's Perfect Christmas	Netflix	Cathryn Michon (director/screenplay); W. Bruce Cameron (screenplay); Dennis Quaid, Milo Ventimiglia, Brooke Lena Johnson, Kathleen Rose Perkins, Jennifer Tilly, Mary Steenburgen, Thomas Haden Church	
N O V E M B E R	4	The Last Temptation of Becky	Quiver Distribution / BoulderLight Pictures	Jenn Wexler (director/screenplay); Matt Angel (screenplay); Lulu Wilson, Neil Patrick Harris, Brandon Flynn, James Urbaniak, Kate Siegel	
N O V E M B E R	6	The Cat in the Hat	Warner Bros. Pictures / Warner Bros. Pictures Animation	Erica Rivinoja, Alessandro Carloni (directors/screenplay); Bill Hader, Matt Berry, Quinta Brunson, Xochitl Gomez, Giancarlo Esposito, America Ferrera	
N O V E M B E R	6	Wild Horse Nine	Searchlight Pictures / Blueprint Pictures / Film4	Martin McDonagh (director/screenplay); John Malkovich, Sam Rockwell, Steve Buscemi, Mariana di Girolamo, Ailín Salas, Tom Waits, Parker Posey	
N O V E M B E R	6	I Play Rocky	Metro-Goldwyn-Mayer / FilmNation Entertainment	Peter Farrelly (director); Peter Gamble (screenplay); Anthony Ippolito, AnnaSophia Robb, Toby Kebbell, P. J. Byrne, Jay Duplass, Matt Dillon, Stephan James, Tracy Letts	
N O V E M B E R	6	Club Kid	A24 / Topic Studios	Jordan Firstman (director/screenplay); Jordan Firstman, Cara Delevingne, Kirby Howell-Baptiste, Colleen Camp, Vicki Pepperdine, Nigil Whyte, Eldar Isgandarov, Saturn Risin9, Miss Benny, Alaska Riley, Diego Calva, Reggie Absolom	
N O V E M B E R	6	Being Heumann	Apple Original Films / Apple Studios	Sian Heder (director/screenplay); Rebekah Taussig (screenplay); Ruth Madeley, Mark Ruffalo, Dylan O'Brien, Ray Fisher, Michael Patrick Thornton, Rob Delaney	
N O V E M B E R	6	Jimmy	Fathom Entertainment	Aaron Burns (director); Justin Strawhand (screenplay); KJ Apa, Max Casella, Kara Killmer, Julian Works, Sarah Drew, Rob Riggle, Christopher McDonald, Jen Lilley, Jemma Donovan, Karolyn Grimes, Neal McDonough, Jason Alexander	
N O V E M B E R	6	Mouse	Independent Film Company / Sapan Studio / Rosalind Productions	Kelly O'Sullivan, Alex Thompson (directors); Kelly O'Sullivan (screenplay); Sophie Okonedo, Katherine Mallen Kupferer, Chloe Coleman, Tara Mallen, Beck Nolan, Iman Vellani, David Hyde Pierce	
N O V E M B E R	6	Drummer Boy	Angel Studios	Joel David Smallbone, Ben Smallbone (directors); Richard L. Ramsey (screenplay); Joel David Smallbone, Lucas Leach, Beth Easdown	
N O V E M B E R	6	Zi	Grasshopper Film	Kogonada (director/screenplay); Michelle Mao, Haley Lu Richardson, Jin Ha	
N O V E M B E R	10	Loves Company	Tribeca Films	Jason Laurits (director/screenplay); Rachel Dratch, Jack Plotnick, Sarah Baker, Bryan Batt, Dustin Ingram, Lady Camden	
N O V E M B E R	11	Ghost Soldier	Columbia Pictures / Mandalay Pictures	William Eubank (director); Chris Papasadero (screenplay); Jim Caviezel, Olivia Thirlby, Beau Knapp, Garret Dillahunt, Shea Whigham	
N O V E M B E R	11	The Gospel of Christmas	Netflix / Tyler Perry Studios	Tyler Perry (director/screenplay); Tank, Fantasia Barrino, Fred Hammond, Ann Nesby, Shirley Caesar, Hezekiah Walker, Jacky Clark Chisholm, Twinkie Clark, Dorinda Clark-Cole, Karen Clark Sheard, Ricco Ross, Chanté Moore, Yolanda Adams, CeCe Winans, Vanessa Bell Armstrong	
N O V E M B E R	11	Confession	The Daily Wire / Bonfire Legend	Václav Marhoul (director); Ben Shapiro (screenplay); Rob Lowe, James Franco, Jennifer Jason Leigh, Kodi Smit-McPhee, Nick Nolte, Richard Brake, Emile Hirsch, Brad Dourif, Dean Norris	
N O V E M B E R	13	Ebenezer	Paramount Pictures / Black Label Media / IN.2 Films	Ti West (director); Nathaniel Halpern (screenplay); Johnny Depp, Rupert Grint, Andrea Riseborough, Sam Claflin, Daisy Ridley, Tramell Tillman, Ian McKellen	
N O V E M B E R	13	How to Rob a Bank	Metro-Goldwyn-Mayer / Imagine Entertainment / 87North Productions	David Leitch (director); Mark Bianculli (screenplay); Nicholas Hoult, Zoë Kravitz, Anna Sawai, Rhenzy Feliz, Paul Sparks, Young Mazino, Tati Gabrielle, Christian Slater, Pete Davidson, John C. Reilly	
N O V E M B E R	13	Paper Tiger	Neon	James Gray (director/screenplay); Adam Driver, Scarlett Johansson, Miles Teller	
N O V E M B E R	13	Heartland	Netflix / Chernin Entertainment	Shana Feste (director/screenplay); Jessica Chastain, Garrett Hedlund, Carter Faith, Ross Lynch, Jennifer Nettles, John Hawkes	
N O V E M B E R	13	Quarter	Chemical Soup Productions	Kelsey Bascom, Arnon Manor (directors); Kelsey Bascom (screenplay); Kelsey Bascom, Brooke Shields, Ali Wentworth, Raven-Symoné, Tati Gabrielle, Breckin Meyer, Matty Cardarople, Mindy Sterling, Dot-Marie Jones, Derek Theler, Brec Bassinger, Arden Myrin, Gavin Lewis, Eric Roberts	
N O V E M B E R	13	God with Us	Variance Films	Jimmy Jenkins (director/screenplay); Ashley Olivia Fisher, Aspen Kennedy, Lil Rel Howery, Rotmi, Gregory Alan Williams, Ashley Rios, Roger Guenveur Smith, Clifton Powell	
N O V E M B E R	17	The Optimist	Well Go USA Entertainment	Finn Taylor (director/screenplay); Stephen Lang, Elsie Fisher, Luke David Blumm, Leah Pipes, Ben Geurens, Ursula Parker, Slavko Sobin, Stella Stocker, Oskar Hes, Robin Weigert	
N O V E M B E R	18	Madden	Amazon MGM Studios / Escape Artists / Skydance Sports	David O. Russell (director/screenplay); Cambron Clark (screenplay); Nicolas Cage, Christian Bale, Kathryn Hahn, John Mulaney, Sienna Miller, Shane Gillis	
N O V E M B E R	18	Guarding Stars	Netflix / Little Engine Productions	Elizabeth Allen Rosenbaum (director); Erin Cardillo, Richard Keith (screenplay); Leighton Meester, Jared Padalecki, Noah LaLonde, Toby Sandeman, Rachael Ancheril, Shaun Johnston, Phil Brooks, Ava Max, Siobhan Williams, Andie MacDowell	
N O V E M B E R	20	The Hunger Games: Sunrise on the Reaping	Lionsgate / Color Force	Francis Lawrence (director); Billy Ray, Michael Lesslie (screenplay); Joseph Zada, Jesse Plemons, Elle Fanning, Kieran Culkin, Mckenna Grace, Whitney Peak, Ben Wang, Maya Hawke, Kelvin Harrison Jr., Ralph Fiennes, Glenn Close	
N O V E M B E R	20	Steps	Netflix / Netflix Animation Studios / Paper Kite Productions	Alyce Tzue, John Ripa (directors); Ava Tramer, James Madejski, Jen Chuck, Dana Schwartz, Felicia Ho (screenplay); Ali Wong, Amanda Seyfried, Stephanie Hsu, Nikki Glaser, Daniel Radcliffe, Young Mazino, Peter Dinklage, Bette Midler	
N O V E M B E R	20	Elsinore	Focus Features / StudioCanal / LD Entertainment	Simon Stone (director); Stephen Beresford (screenplay); Andrew Scott, Olivia Colman, Billie Piper, Johnny Flynn, Luke Thompson, David Dawson, Matthew Beard, Joe Locke, Juliet Stevenson, Peter Mullan	
N O V E M B E R	20	Josephine	Sumerian Pictures	Beth de Araújo (director/screenplay); Channing Tatum, Gemma Chan, Mason Reeves, Philip Ettinger, Syra McCarthy, Michael Angelo Covino	
N O V E M B E R	20	Best Pancakes in the County	Independent Film Company	Ken Sanzel (director/screenplay); Nicolas Cage, Justin Long, Shelley Hennig, Ravi Patel	
N O V E M B E R	20	The Vile	Dark Sky Films / Image Nation Studios / Spooky Pictures	Majid Al Ansari (director/screenplay); Bdoor Mohammad, Jasem AlKharraz, Iman Tarik, Sarah Taibah	
N O V E M B E R	20	After This Death	Sundance Now / 2AM	Lucio Castro (director/screenplay); Mía Maestro, Lee Pace, Rupert Friend, Gwendoline Christie, Philip Ettinger	
N O V E M B E R	23	Clashing Through the Snow	Amazon MGM Studios / Wonderland Sound and Vision	Carlson Young (director); Daniel Mackey, Rebecca Ewing (screenplay); Christopher Briney, Michelle Randolph, Lukas Gage, Paris Hilton, Julia Fox, PJ Byrne, Andrew Schulz	
N O V E M B E R	25	Focker-in-Law	Universal Pictures / Paramount Pictures / Tribeca Enterprises / Red Hour Productions	John Hamburg (director/screenplay); Robert De Niro, Ben Stiller, Ariana Grande, Owen Wilson, Blythe Danner, Teri Polo, Skyler Gisondo, Beanie Feldstein, Eduardo Franco	
N O V E M B E R	25	Hexed	Walt Disney Pictures / Walt Disney Animation Studios	Fawn Veerasunthorn, Jason Hand (directors); Jared Bush, Dana Ledoux Miller, Jon Robin Baitz (screenplay); Hailee Steinfeld, Rashida Jones, Jodie Foster, Walton Goggins, Tracey Ullman, Stephen Fry, Henry Winkler, Dan Stevens, Brett Gelman, Samson Kayo	
N O V E M B E R	25	The Further Mis-Adventures of Cliff Booth	Netflix / Plan B Entertainment	David Fincher (director); Quentin Tarantino (screenplay); Brad Pitt, Elizabeth Debicki, Scott Caan, Carla Gugino, Yahya Abdul-Mateen II, Peter Weller, Matt Groove, JB Tadena, Corey Fogelmanis, Karren Karagulian	
N O V E M B E R	25	Way of the Warrior Kid	Apple TV / Apple Studios / Skydance Media / Wonderland Sound and Vision / FilmNation Entertainment	McG (director); Will Staples (screenplay); Chris Pratt, Jude Hill, Linda Cardellini	.
N O V E M B E R	25	Hershey	Angel Studios / The Hershey Company	Mark Waters (director); Sharon Paul, Timothy Michael Hayes (screenplay); Finn Wittrock, Alexandra Daddario, Alan Ruck, Richard Kind	
N O V E M B E R	27	Tangles	Independent Film Company / Point Grey Pictures	Leah Nelson (director/screenplay); Sarah Leavitt, Trev Renney (screenplay); Julia Louis-Dreyfus, Abbi Jacobson, Bryan Cranston, Beanie Feldstein, Seth Rogen, Samira Wiley, Pamela Adlon, Pat Finn, Philip Rosenthal, Adam Shapiro, Sarah Silverman, Wanda Sykes, Bowen Yang	
N O V E M B E R	27	In Waves	Netflix / Anonymous Content	Phuong Mai Nguyen (director); Fanny Burdino, Samuel Doux (screenplay); Will Sharpe, Stephanie Hsu	
D E C E M B E R	2	The Man with the Bag	Amazon MGM Studios / Grey Matter	Adam Shankman (director); Allan Rice (screenplay); Arnold Schwarzenegger, Alan Ritchson, Berkeley James, Michael Cyril Creighton, Liza Koshy, Kyle Mooney, Jane Krakowski, Ken Jeong, Awkwafina	
D E C E M B E R	2	In a Holidaze	Netflix / Alloy Entertainment	Tiffany Paulsen (director/screenplay); Maddie Ziegler, Graham Phillips, Elias Kacavas, Patton Oswalt, Jackie Sandler, Andrea Anders, Gil Bellows, Rob Lowe	
D E C E M B E R	4	Violent Night 2	Universal Pictures / 87North Productions	Tommy Wirkola (director); Pat Casey, Josh Miller (screenplay); David Harbour, Kristen Bell, Jared Harris, Joe Pantoliano, Maxwell Friedman, Daniela Melchior, Andrew Bachelor	
D E C E M B E R	4	Behemoth!	Searchlight Pictures	Tony Gilroy (director/screenplay); Pedro Pascal, Olivia Wilde, Eva Victor, Alexa Swinton, Erik Griffin, JoBeth Williams, Margarita Levieva, Hank Azaria, Will Arnett	
D E C E M B E R	4	Ray Gunn	Netflix / Skydance Animation	Brad Bird (director/screenplay); Matthew Robbins (screenplay); Sam Rockwell, Scarlett Johansson, Tom Waits, Matt Berry, Bobby Cannavale, Michelle Rodriguez, Matt Jones, Aasif Mandvi, Alan Tudyk, Kathryn Hunter	
D E C E M B E R	4	Diary of a Wimpy Kid Christmas: The Getaway	Disney+ / Walt Disney Pictures / Bardel Entertainment	Matt Danner (director); Jacob Isaac Peterson, Chris Diamantopoulos, Hunter Dillon, Erica Cerra, Gracen Newton, Jude Zarzaur, Fred Armisen, Beau Bridges, Jeff Hiller, Keyla Monterroso Mejia	
D E C E M B E R	4	Above the Below	Lionsgate	Idris Elba, Martin Owen (directors); Elizabeth Morris, Matt Mitchell, Vicki Sargent (screenplay); Idris Elba, Caitlin FitzGerald, Hero Fiennes Tiffin	
D E C E M B E R	4	The Gallerist	Roadside Attractions / Vertical / MountainA / Concordia Studio / MRC	Cathy Yan (director/screenplay); James Pedersen (screenplay); Natalie Portman, Jenna Ortega, Sterling K. Brown, Daniel Brühl, Charli XCX, Zach Galifianakis, Da'Vine Joy Randolph, Catherine Zeta-Jones	
D E C E M B E R	4	November 1963	Ketchup Entertainment / Minds Eye Entertainment	Roland Joffé (director); Nicholas Celozzi (screenplay); John Travolta, Robert Carlyle, Dermot Mulroney, Jefferson White, Mandy Patinkin	
D E C E M B E R	4	Eternal Return	Quiver Distribution / Village Roadshow Pictures	Yaniv Raz (director/screenplay); Naomi Scott, Kit Harington, Simon Callow, Sonoya Mizuno, Jay Lycurgo	
D E C E M B E R	4	Flavia	Magenta Light Studios	Bharat Nalluri (director); Susan Coyne (screenplay); Molly Belle Wright, Martin Freeman, Toby Jones, Jonathan Pryce	
D E C E M B E R	4	The Friend's House Is Here	Greenwich Entertainment	Hossein Keshavarz, Maryam Ataei (directors/screenplay); Mahshad Bahram, Hana Mana, Farzad Karen, Zohreh Pirnia	
D E C E M B E R	4	Games We Play	Blue Fox Entertainment / Vertical	Rachel Dahl (director); Molly Scharlin Ben-Hamoo, Margot Pitts (screenplay); Casey Cott, Margot Pitts, Dylan McTee, Adam Faison	
D E C E M B E R	4	The Patient	Buffalo 8 / BondIt Media Capital	Mukunda Michael Dewil (director/screenplay); Ryan Phillippe, Kate Beckinsale, David Cade, Kelly Greyson, Michael Sirow	
D E C E M B E R	11	The Debut	A24 / Topic Studios / Fruit Tree	Jesse Eisenberg (director/screenplay); Julianne Moore, Paul Giamatti, Halle Bailey, Colton Ryan, Jesse Eisenberg, Bonnie Milligan, Lilli Cooper, Maulik Pancholy, Bernadette Peters	
D E C E M B E R	11	Zero A. D.: The Birth of Christ	Angel Studios	Alejandro Gómez Monteverde (director); Rod Barr (screenplay); Deva Cassel, Sam Worthington, Ben Mendelsohn, Gael García Bernal, Jim Caviezel	
D E C E M B E R	11	Bad Day	Netflix	Jake Syzmanski (director); Laura Solon (screenplay); Cameron Diaz, Danielle Brooks, Rhenzy Feliz, John Higgins, Mark Duplass, Jessica Belkin, Rob Corddry, Ayden Mayeri, Ben Schwartz, Ed O'Neill	
D E C E M B E R	11	Killing Castro	Lionsgate	Eif Rivera (director); Thomas DeGrezia, Leon Hendrix (screenplay); Al Pacino, Diego Boneta, Xolo Maridueña, KiKi Layne, Alexander Ludwig, Ron Livingston, Kendrick Sampson, Nicole Beharie, Logan Marshall-Green, Titus Welliver, Frankie Faison, Paul Ben-Victor	
D E C E M B E R	11	Clarissa	Neon	Arie Esiri, Chuko Esiri (directors); Chuko Esiri (screenplay); Sophie Okonedo, David Oyelowo, India Amarteifio, Toheeb Jimoh, Jude Akuwudike, Danny Sapani, Modesinuola Ogundiwin, Chuks Joseph, Fortune Nwafor, Nikki Amuka-Bird, Joke Silva, Ayo Edebiri	
D E C E M B E R	11	Ink	Netflix / StudioCanal	Danny Boyle (director); James Graham (screenplay); Jack O'Connell, Guy Pearce, Claire Foy	
D E C E M B E R	11	Bedford Park	Sony Pictures Classics	Stephanie Ahn (director/screenplay); Moon Choi, Son Suk-ku, Won Mi-kyung, Kim Eung-soo, Jefferson White	
D E C E M B E R	16	Give Me Some Sugah	Netflix / Tyler Perry Studios	Tasha Smith (director); Randy Brown (screenplay); Taraji P. Henson, Joey Bada$$, Aunjanue Ellis-Taylor, Russell Hornsby, Alexis Louder, Semaj Prather, Arischa Conner, Angela Davis, Caroline Avery Granger, Tasha Smith, DeVon Franklin	
D E C E M B E R	18	Avengers: Doomsday	Marvel Studios / AGBO	Anthony Russo, Joe Russo (directors); Stephen McFeely, Michael Waldron (screenplay); Robert Downey Jr., Chris Evans, Chris Hemsworth, Pedro Pascal, Paul Rudd, Anthony Mackie, Florence Pugh, Vanessa Kirby, Ebon Moss-Bachrach, Wyatt Russell, Channing Tatum, Simu Liu, Hayley Atwell, Tom Hiddleston, James Marsden, Joseph Quinn, Sebastian Stan, David Harbour, Letitia Wright, Lewis Pullman, Kelsey Grammer, Kathryn Newton, Danny Ramirez, Winston Duke, Alan Cumming, Hannah John-Kamen, Rebecca Romijn, Tenoch Huerta Mejía, Mabel Cadena, Alex Livinalli, Ian McKellen, Patrick Stewart	
D E C E M B E R	18	Dune: Part Three	Warner Bros. Pictures / Legendary Pictures	Denis Villeneuve (director/screenplay); Brian K. Vaughan (screenplay); Timothée Chalamet, Zendaya, Florence Pugh, Jason Momoa, Rebecca Ferguson, Isaach De Bankolé, Charlotte Rampling, Anya Taylor-Joy, Robert Pattinson, Javier Bardem	
D E C E M B E R	23	The Angry Birds Movie 3	Paramount Pictures / Prime Focus Studios / Rovio Entertainment / Sega / Dentsu	John Rice (director); Thurop Van Orman (screenplay); Jason Sudeikis, Josh Gad, Emma Myers, Rachel Bloom, Walker Scobell, Danny McBride, Marcello Hernández, Tim Robinson, Anna Cathcart, Maitreyi Ramakrishnan, Nikki Glaser, MrBeast, Salish Matter, Psalm West, Sam Richardson, James Austin Johnson, Lily James, Keke Palmer	
D E C E M B E R	25	Jumanji: Open World	Columbia Pictures / Seven Bucks Productions	Jake Kasdan (director); Jeff Pinkner, Scott Rosenberg (screenplay); Dwayne Johnson, Jack Black, Kevin Hart, Karen Gillan, Nick Jonas, Awkwafina, Alex Wolff, Morgan Turner, Ser'Darius Blain, Madison Iseman, Rhys Darby, Lamorne Morris, Bebe Neuwirth, Danny DeVito	
D E C E M B E R	25	Werwulf	Focus Features / Working Title Films / Maiden Voyage Pictures	Robert Eggers (director/screenplay); Sjón (screenplay); Aaron Taylor-Johnson, Willem Dafoe, Lily-Rose Depp, Ralph Ineson, Bodhi Rae Breathnach	
D E C E M B E R	25	Mr. Irrelevant	Paramount Pictures / Skydance Sports	Jonathan Levine (director); Nick Santora (screenplay); David Corenswet, Isabel May, Michael Shannon	
D E C E M B E R	25	Artificial	Neon / Heyday Films / Frenesy Film Company	Luca Guadagnino (director); Simon Rich (screenplay); Andrew Garfield, Yura Borisov, Monica Barbaro, Cooper Hoffman, Jason Schwartzman, Chris O'Dowd, Ike Barinholtz, Mark Rylance	

== See also ==
- 2026 in film
