= Brainstorm Media =

US film distributor and production company

Logo used since 2023

Brainstorm Media is an American film distributor and production company based in Los Angeles, California. The company was founded in 1995.

In 2014, Brainstorm Media partnered with the North American home video company Shout Factory to release Jack and the Cuckoo-Clock Heart. It was also behind LaRoy, Texas (2024), The Other Zoey (2023), and The 11th Hour (2014).
