= Keep Quiet and Forgive =

2026 documentary film

- Directed by: Sarah McClure
- Produced by: Sarah McClure
- Distributed by: PBS
- Release dates: October 11, 2025 (Buffalo); March 23, 2026
- Running time: 90 minutes
- Country: United States
- Language: English

Keep Quiet and Forgive is a 2025 American PBS documentary film about sexual abuse in Amish and Mennonite communities, and the culture of silence which keeps victims from speaking out or reporting the abuse to authorities.

== Synopsis ==
Keep Quiet and Forgive follows a group of Amish and Mennonite individuals who were victims of sexual abuse and the surrounding culture of silence they faced in their communities. The film focuses on Lizzie Hershberger, a former Amish woman who was raped and abused as a teenager in Minnesota. The film also explores how obedience and acquiescence is "ingrained from childhood" in the Amish community, along with a distrust in law enforcement or other outsiders.

Three decades after her abuse ended, Hershberger filed charges against her abuser, with the film showing her abuser being escorted away in handcuffs. Lizzie is followed as she meets other abuse survivors throughout the country, including Ohio, Pennsylvania and Florida. The film introduces a young man named Menno who also suffered abuse, who stayed quiet until seeing Lizzie share her own experiences. The film also explores how people who speak up are excommunicated and shunned.

== Production ==
The filmmaker, Sarah McClure, became aware of this topic after meeting a former Amish woman who had been sexually abused and who eventually introduced McClure to Hershberger. McClure originally published an expose in Cosmopolitan, calling the film more of a "continuation of the article, rather than a rehashing". Filming began in September 2019 and ran through March 2025, and was filmed in multiple states with populations of Anabaptists including Minnesota, Wisconsin, Missouri, Indiana, Ohio and Pennsylvania.

The film premiered at the 2025 Buffalo International Film Festival on October 11, 2025, and was released on March 23, 2026.

== Reception ==
Louisa Moore of Screen Zealots called the film a "powerful and deeply unsettling exploration of sexual abuse within Amish and Mennonite communities". The Milwaukee Magazine praised the film for its exploration of the "intensely secretive Amish community" and for offering a message of hope to survivors.
