= Cat Cam =

2026 horror film directed by Sara Werner

- Promotional release poster
- Directed by: Sara Werner
- Written by: Hilary Helding
- Produced by: Hilary Helding
- Starring: Nug the Cat; Cronin Cullen; Colleen Evanson; Bry Gallagher
- Cinematography: Rob E. Bennett
- Edited by: Blake Hawk
- Distributed by: X4 Pictures
- Release dates: February 28, 2026 (ScorpiusFest); August 25, 2026 (VOD)
- Running time: 95 minutes
- Country: United States
- Language: English

Cat Cam (stylized as [CAT CAM🔴]) is a 2026 American independent found-footage supernatural horror film written by Hilary Helding and directed by Sara Werner. Utilizing a screenlife and stationary device format, the film follows a couple who set up pet security cameras in their home while away on a trip, only to uncover terrifying supernatural occurrences tied to their cat's strange behavior.

After a festival run where it won multiple awards, the film was acquired by X4 Pictures and released on digital VOD platforms on August 25, 2026.

== Cast ==
- Nug the Cat as itself
- Cronin Cullen as Jay
- Jiavani
- Bry Gallagher
- Colleen Evanson
- Michele Hart as Anne

== Production ==
The independent horror feature was written by Hilary Helding and co-directed/produced by Sara Werner. The film relies heavily on tech-horror and screenlife aesthetics, framing its terror entirely through the perspective of fixed household pet cameras and smart devices.

== Release ==
The film premiered at ScorpiusFest on February 28, 2026, Chicago Film Frenzy on March 27, 2026, Panic Fest on April 13, 2026, GASP! Horror Film Festival on June 28, 2026, Hysteria Fest on July 11, 2026, and Popcorn Frights Film Festival on August 6, 2026,

X4 Pictures subsequently picked up distribution rights for North America, releasing the film on August 25, 2026, via VOD platforms including Amazon Prime Video, Fandango, etc.

== Reception ==
=== Accolades ===
The film reportedly won seven awards including Best Feature Film and Best Actor Award at B!tchFest Film Festival & Screenplay Contest (Season 2) though the remaining awards that the film received didn't publicized.

Year	Event	Category	Recipient	Result	Ref.
2026	B!tchFest Film Festival & Screenplay Contest (Season 2)	Best Feature Film	Cat Cam	Won	
2026	B!tchFest Film Festival & Screenplay Contest (Season 2)	Best Actor	Cronin Cullen	Won	
