= Bad Voodoo =

2026 horror film by Andrew Adlre & Andre Hepburn

- Release poster
- Directed by: Andrew Adler; Andre Hepburn
- Screenplay by: Devin Fearn
- Story by: Andre Hepburn
- Produced by: Andrew Adler; Andre Hepburn; Marie Brandt
- Starring: John Fiore; Manny Perez; Cristina Moody; Charlie Alejandro; Justin Genna; Alex Joseph Pires
- Cinematography: Neil Guliano
- Edited by: Kelly Hois
- Music by: Grace-Mary Burega
- Production companies: Alpha Productions; Redemption Motion Pictures; Motion Picture Exchange
- Distributed by: Deskpop Entertainment
- Release date: February 10, 2026
- Running time: 86 minutes
- Country: United States
- Language: English

Bad Voodoo (stylized in all caps) is a 2026 American independent supernatural horror film directed by Andrew Adler and Andre Hepburn in their feature directorial debut. The film stars Manny Pérez, John Fiore, and Cristina Moody. It was released on VOD and DVD on February 10, 2026, by DeskPop Entertainment.

== Plot ==
After escaping custody, two fugitives force their way into an isolated home and take the woman inside hostage. What begins as a plan to lay low quickly unravels when they realize the house is tied to a dark Voodoo curse. The spell was created by a bereaved couple seeking retribution for the loss of their children, and now the property is haunted by a vengeful force. Trapped overnight, the criminals are forced to confront a supernatural entity that thrives on guilt, bloodshed, and the souls of the lost.

== Cast ==
- John Fiore
- Manny Perez as Escaped Convict
- Cristina Moody as Abigail
- Charlie Alejandro
- Justin Genna
- Alex Joseph Pires
- Jimmy C. Jules as Houngans

== Production ==
The film was produced by Redemption Motion Pictures. Devin Fearn wrote the screenplay, based on a story by Andre Hepburn. Hepburn stated the film was his way of "confronting grief" after losing his father, and said "grief can haunt us as powerfully as any monster." Co-director Andrew Adler said they used supernatural horror "to tell a deeply human story about moral boundaries" and how loss can distort justice. The score was composed by Grace-Mary Burega, her first feature film score.

== Release ==
Bad Voodoo was released on VOD and DVD in the United States on February 10, 2026. It was released digitally in the United Kingdom on March 16, 2026. The film is available on Apple TV, Google Play Movies, Vudu, Amazon Video, and YouTube.

== Reception ==
Critical reception was mixed. Horror Screams Video Vault described it as a "visceral experience rooted in eerie atmospherics". Other reviews criticized it as a "low-budget movie with cringe-worthy acting, a weak story, and terrible special effects." Bloody Disgusting published an article covering the trailer release.

Catherine Bray of The Guardian gave the film a rating of 2/5 and wrote: As for any cultural sensitivities around portrayal of voodoo … on the whole this enterprise is so unrelated to reality that it would feel like getting mad at a child’s drawing.
