= Lil Dicky discography =

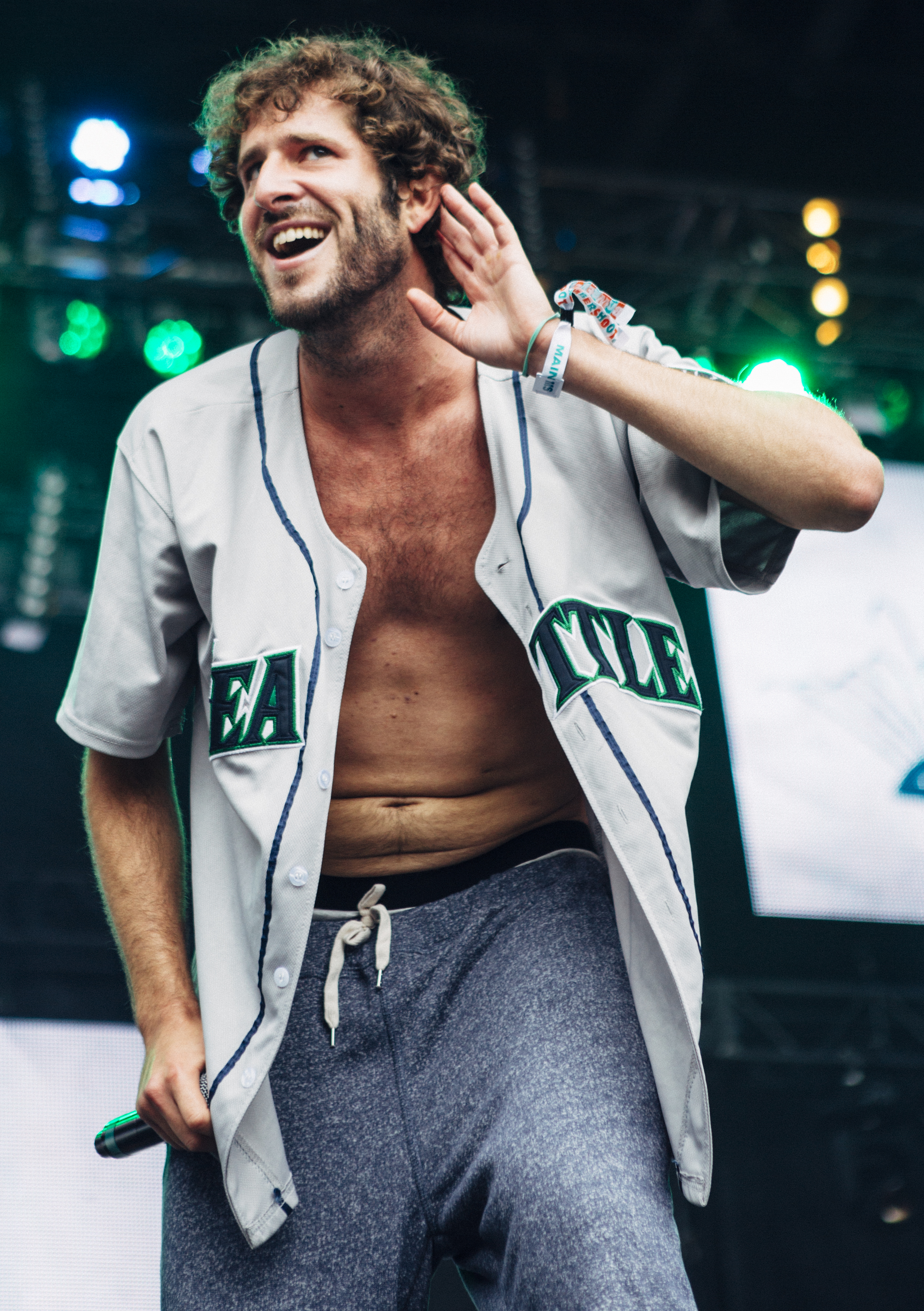
- Lil Dicky in 2015
- Studio albums: 1
- EPs: 1
- Singles: 10
- Mixtapes: 2

The discography of American rapper Lil Dicky consists of one studio album, one soundtrack, two mixtapes, one EP, ten singles (including three as a featured artist). His debut studio album, Professional Rapper, was self-released on July 31, 2015. It peaked at number 7 on the Billboard 200, as well as charting on the Top R&B/Hip-Hop Albums and Top Rap Albums at number two and one respectively. Lil Dicky's debut mixtape, So Hard, was released on May 22, 2013.

In 2014, he released his debut single "Lemme Freak". It charted in the US Comedy chart at 3rd and was certified gold by the RIAA. His first song to peak on the Hot 100 was "Save Dat Money", a collaboration with rappers Rich Homie Quan and Fetty Wap. The song peaked at number 71 on the Billboard Hot 100. His highest-charting song in the United States is the 2018 collaboration with American R&B singer Chris Brown, titled "Freaky Friday". The song was certified platinum in three countries and 5× platinum in the United States. In 2019, he released the single, "Earth", in association with Leonardo DiCaprio Foundation, which was made to raise awareness for the earth and featured multiple guest vocalists. The song debuted and peaked at number 17 on the Billboard Hot 100.

== Studio albums ==
List of albums, with selected chart positions and sales figures
Title	Album details	Peak chart positions					Certifications
Title	Album details	US	US R&B/HH	US Rap	US Indie	US Comedy	Certifications
Professional Rapper	Released: July 31, 2015; Label: Self-released; Formats: CD, digital download	7	2	1	1	1	RIAA: Platinum

== Soundtracks ==
List of albums, with selected chart positions and sales figures
Title	Album details	Peak chart positions				
Title	Album details	US	US R&B/HH	US Rap	US Indie	US Comedy
Penith (The Dave Soundtrack)	Released: January 19, 2024; Label: Dirty Burd; Formats: CD, CS, LP, digital download	54	21	17	9	1

== Mixtapes ==
List of mixtapes, showing selected details
Title	Mixtape details
So Hard	Released: May 22, 2013; Label: Self-released; Format: Digital download
Hump Days	Released: September 9, 2014; Label: Self-released; Format: Digital download

== EPs ==
List of EPs, showing selected details
Title	EP details
I'm Brain (as Brain ft. Lil Dicky)	Released: September 14, 2017; Label: Commission, BMG Rights Management; Format: Digital download

== Singles ==
=== As lead artist ===
List of singles, with selected chart positions and certifications, showing year released and album name
Title	Year	Peak chart positions										Certifications	Album
Title	Year	US	US Com.	US R&B/HH	US Rap	AUS	CAN	IRE	NZ	SWE	UK	Certifications	Album
"Ex-Boyfriend"	2013	—	—	—	—	—	—	—	—	—	—		Non-album single
"Lemme Freak"	2014	—	2	—	—	—	—	—	—	—	—	RIAA: Gold	Professional Rapper
"White Crime"	2014	—	5	—	—	—	—	—	—	—	—		Professional Rapper
"Save Dat Money" (featuring Fetty Wap and Rich Homie Quan)	2015	71	1	23	14	—	54	—	—	—	—	RIAA: 2× Platinum; RMNZ: Gold	Professional Rapper
"Professional Rapper" (featuring Snoop Dogg)	2015	—	1	—	—	—	—	—	—	—	—	RIAA: Platinum; RMNZ: Gold	Professional Rapper
"Freaky Friday" (featuring Chris Brown)	2018	8	1	5	—	4	10	3	1	21	1	RIAA: 5× Platinum; MC: 3× Platinum; ARIA: 3× Platinum; BPI: 2× Platinum; RMNZ: 3× Platinum	Non-album singles
"Earth"	2019	17	1	—	—	17	3	18	20	35	21	RIAA: Platinum; MC: Platinum; BPI: Silver; RMNZ: Gold	Non-album singles
"Hi, I'm Dave"	2020	—	—	—	—	—	—	—	—	—	—		Penith (The Dave Soundtrack)
"We Good" (with GaTa)	2021	—	—	—	—	—	—	—	—	—	—		Penith (The Dave Soundtrack)
"Mr. McAdams"	2023	—	—	—	—	—	—	—	—	—	—		Penith (The Dave Soundtrack)
"—" denotes a recording that did not chart or was not released in that territory.

=== As featured artist ===
Title	Year	Peak chart positions	Certifications	Album
Title	Year	US R&B/HH Bub.	Certifications	Album
"Just a Lil' Thick (She Juicy)" (Trinidad James featuring Mystikal and Lil Dicky)	2016	2	RIAA: Gold	Non-album single
"Sit Down" (Kent Jones featuring Ty Dolla $ign, Lil Dicky, and E-40)	2016	—		Too Much Too Soon
"Dirty Work" (Marko Penn featuring Lil Dicky)	2017	—		Non-album single
"—" denotes a recording that did not chart or was not released in that territory.

== Other certified songs ==
Title	Year	Certifications	Album	
"Molly" (featuring Brendon Urie)	2015	RMNZ: Gold	Album	Professional Rapper

== Guest appearances ==
List of non-single guest appearances, with other performing artists, showing year released and album name
Title	Year	Other artist(s)	Album
"Running Over"	2020	Justin Bieber	Changes

== Music videos ==
Title	Year	Director(s)
"The Cypher"	2013	Unknown
"Ex-Boyfriend"	2013	Brian Storm
"Staying In"	2013	Unknown
"Sports"	2013	Juli Lopez
"Jewish Flow"	2013	Marcus Ubungen
"Too High"	2013	Mickey Finnegan
"I'm Right"	2014	Alex DelVecchio
"Lemme Freak"	2014	Tony Yacenda
"White Crime"	2014	Phillip Lopez
"Classic Male Pregame"	2014	Tony Yacenda
"Professional Rapper" (featuring Snoop Dogg)	2015	Douglas Einar Olsen
"$ave Dat Money" (featuring Fetty Wap and Rich Homie Quan)	2015	Tony Yacenda
"Molly" (featuring Brendon Urie)	2016	James Lees
"Pillow Talking" (featuring Brain)	2017	Tony Yacenda
"Freaky Friday" (featuring Chris Brown)	2018	Tony Yacenda
"Earth"	2019	Nigel Tierney, Federico Heller
