= So Hard (disambiguation) =

"So Hard" is a song by the English group Pet Shop Boys, released as the first single from their 1990 album Behaviour.

So Hard may also refer to:

- "So Hard", a song by rapper Bizarre from the 2007 album Blue Cheese & Coney Island
- So Hard (mixtape), the debut official mixtape by American rapper Lil Dicky
