= Good Mourning (film) =

2022 American stoner comedy film

- Promotional release poster
- Directed by: Colson Baker; Mod Sun
- Written by: Colson Baker; Mod Sun
- Produced by: Colson Baker; Mod Sun; Chris Long; Jib Polhemus
- Starring: Colson Baker; Mod Sun; Becky G; Dove Cameron; Pete Davidson; Whitney Cummings; Megan Fox
- Cinematography: Micky Froehlich
- Edited by: A.J. Dickerson
- Music by: Allison Wright Clark
- Production companies: Cedar Park Studios; Raven Capital Management
- Distributed by: Briarcliff Entertainment; Open Road Films
- Release date: May 20, 2022
- Running time: 93 minutes
- Country: United States
- Language: English
- Box office: $21,348

Good Mourning is a 2022 American stoner comedy film written, produced, directed by and starring Machine Gun Kelly (credited as Colson Baker) and Mod Sun, in their directorial debuts. It also stars Zach Villa, GaTa, Becky G, Dove Cameron and Megan Fox.

The film follows the movie star London Clash's as he wakes up to a break up text from the love of his life. And the most important meeting of his career is scheduled for later that same day. Compounded by roommates, London's day keeps going downhill until ultimately. He is forced to choose between pursuing his one true love and landing a life-changing, starring role in a major motion picture.

Good Mourning was theatrically released on May 20, 2022, through Open Road Films. The film received universally negative reviews from critics, garnering 0% on Rotten Tomatoes, and its box office was negatively impacted at the time of the release. It was nominated for five Razzies at the 43rd Golden Raspberry Awards, including Worst Picture, winning Worst Director for Baker and Mod Sun.

== Plot ==
Actor London Clash wakes up to text messages from his girlfriend, Apple, including an apology and the phrase "good mourning". He is unable to reach her, and worries that the messages are a breakup. Compounding his stress are the arrival of his new assistant, Olive, and a role in a new Batman film that he is waiting to hear about. He manages to make contact with Apple, but their conversation is interrupted when Trippie Redd hits him with a water balloon, breaking his phone. London, along with friends Angel and Leo, break into Apple's house looking for her, only to shatter urns containing her cremated relatives. Angel proposes using cannabis ash to replace the remains, and the three embark on a heavy smoking session with the help of their friends Dylan, Fat Joe and Kennedy.

Olive provides London with a new phone, which he uses to get in touch with Apple. However, when his friends return to Apple's house to replace the urns, they see her leaving the house with another man. London skips a meeting with the director of the Batman movie to meet Apple at a Van Nuys airport. He is knocked out by the unknown man, which is filmed by Dennis Rodman, but is rescued and treated by his stalker, Sabrina. Meanwhile, Leo attends the meeting in London's place, wearing a mask to conceal his identity. In the middle of the meeting, he and Dylan are arrested after being spotted leaving Apple’s house.

London makes it home to find Apple waiting, who reveals that the mysterious man was her stylist, and the "good mourning" text was simply a typo. Furious at London for his behavior, she breaks up with him, and Maxine fires him as a client. After bailing Dylan and Leo out of jail, the group heads to a party Apple is attending at YG's house, but are unable to get in. After getting Fat Joe out of a k-hole, they travel to a late night diner. Olive arrives with Maxine on the phone, who tells London that the viral video of him getting punched in the face has landed him the Batman role. He calls Apple, who agrees to meet him at the site of their first kiss. However, while texting and driving, he crashes into Apple, landing the two of them in the same hospital room together.

A post-credits scene appears to indicate that the events of the film were in fact an episode of a television show, with London Clash (played by a British actor) a character.

== Cast ==
- Machine Gun Kelly as London Clash
- Mod Sun as Dylan
- Becky G as Apple
- Dove Cameron as Olive
- GaTa as Leo
- Zach Villa as Angel
- Jenna Boyd as Sabrina the Stalker
- Boo Johnson as Fat Joe
- Amber Rose as Weed Girl
- Avril Lavigne as herself
- Dennis Rodman as Basketball Cameo
- Rickey Thompson as Workout Demon
- Tom Arnold as Famous Director
- Whitney Cummings as Maxine
- Megan Fox as Kennedy
- Pete Davidson as Berry
- Adin Ross as Airport Worker
- Danny Trejo as Method Cameo
- YG as Party Cameo
- Trippie Redd as Pool Guest
- Brittany Furlan as Waitress
- Snoop Dogg as The Joint

== Reception ==
=== Critical response ===
On the review aggregator website Rotten Tomatoes, 0% of 7 critics' reviews are positive.

Writing for Paste magazine, Natalia Keogan described the film's screenplay as "lackluster to its very core", negatively suggesting it was solely made as an excuse for Baker and his friends to have fun while being filmed, finding that "[I]n the current barren wasteland that is the stoner comedy landscape, this laziness is nothing short of inexcusable." Jeffrey Anderson of Common Sense Media gave it 2 out of 5 and wrote: "without help from outside substances, this showbiz/stoner comedy doesn't really offer anything we haven't seen before and never achieves more than a mild chuckle."

=== Box office ===
In the United States and Canada, the film earned $16,010 from 28 theaters in its opening weekend. In total the film has grossed $21,348.

=== Accolades ===
At the 43rd Golden Raspberry Awards, the film received seven nominations: Worst Picture, Worst Director, Worst Actor (for Kelly), Worst Supporting Actor (for Sun and for Davidson), Worst Screenplay, and Worst Screen Combo (for Kelly and Sun), winning Worst Director.

| Year | Award | Category | Result | Recipient |
|---|---|---|---|---|
| 2023 | Golden Raspberry Awards | Worst Picture | Nominated | Chris Long, Machine Gun Kelly, Jib Polhemus, and Mod Sun |
| 2023 | Golden Raspberry Awards | Worst Director | Won | Machine Gun Kelly and Mod Sun |
| 2023 | Golden Raspberry Awards | Worst Actor | Nominated | Machine Gun Kelly |
| 2023 | Golden Raspberry Awards | Worst Supporting Actor | Nominated | Pete Davidson |
| 2023 | Golden Raspberry Awards | Worst Supporting Actor | Nominated | Mod Sun |
| 2023 | Golden Raspberry Awards | Worst Screen Combo | Nominated | Machine Gun Kelly and Mod Sun |
| 2023 | Golden Raspberry Awards | Worst Screenplay | Nominated | "written" by Machine Gun Kelly and Mod Sun |
