= Nigel Tierney =

Irish-American Director

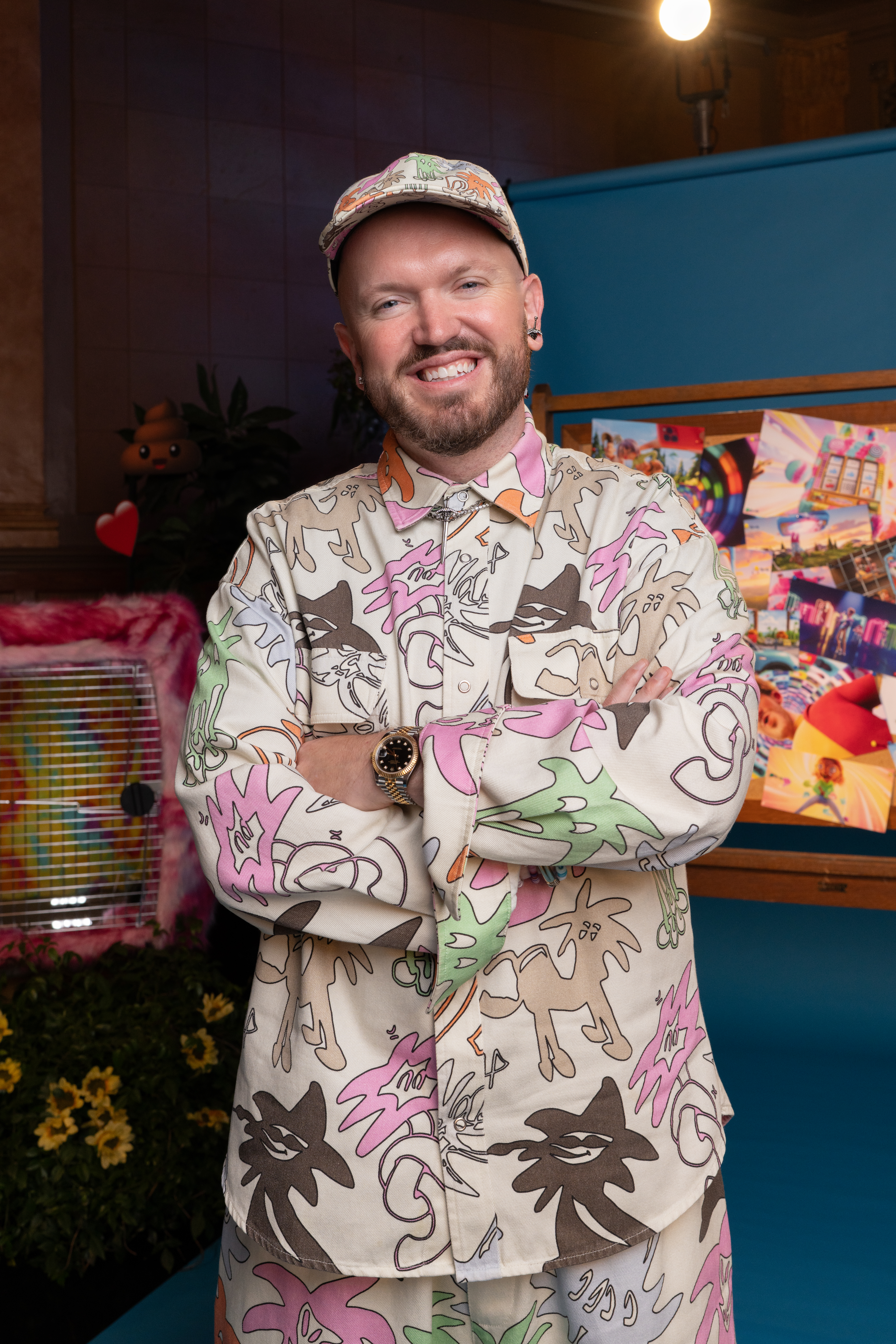
- Born: June 6, 1983 (age 43); Ireland
- Occupations: Director; Producer
- Known for: Earth (2019); The Croods (2013); Shrek Forever After (2010)
- Website: www.tierneycorp.com//

Nigel W. Tierney is an Irish-American director and producer based in Los Angeles. His notable credits include projects such as Lil Dicky's star-studded music video Earth (2019), and several DreamWorks productions such as Shrek Forever After (2010) or Kung-Fu Panda 3 (2016).

== Career ==
Nigel Tierney's career started at DreamWorks Animation, where he worked on several major productions as Lead Technical Director, including Shrek Forever After (2010), The Croods (2013), How To Train Your Dragon 2 (2014), Kung-Fu Panda 3 (2016) and Captain Underpants (2017). During his time at DreamWorks, he also participated in original productions such as the short film Bilby (2018). In parallel, he founded the J/K Comedy Club which became a staple of the DreamWorks campus.

Tierney's career moved forward as he took the role of director and executive producer on several musical projects, all incorporating animation. His credits include Jaden Smith's music video Goku (2018) or Lil Dicky's Earth (2019). In 2022, he directed Bad Bunny's 360 visualizers for his album Un Verano Sin Ti, which include 21 immersive videos.

In 2021, he co-directed and produced his first animated feature film Goldbeak (2021). He is presently developing an animated Broadway musical with composer Jeff Marx. His short film Addicted To It (2026) is considered an initial taste of this musical.

== Selected filmography ==
- Shrek Forever After (2010)
- The Croods (2013)
- How To Train Your Dragons 2 (2014)
- Home (2015)
- Kung Fu Panda 3 (2016)
- Captain Underpants: The First Epic Movie (2017)
- Bilby (2018)
- Goldbeak (2021)
- Addicted To It (2026)
