= Taylor Misiak =

American actress

- Born: February 17, 1992 (age 34); San Francisco, California, U.S
- Occupation: Actress
- Years active: 2010–present
- Spouse: Tony Yacenda (m. 2024)

Taylor Misiak (/ˈmɪʃæk/; born on February 17, 1992) is an American actress. She began her acting career starring in short films and having minor roles in television series. She is best known for her co-leading roles in the Pillow Talking music video, by Lil Dicky and in the FX series Dave. She also acts in the Fox series Going Dutch.

== Early life ==
Misiak was born in San Francisco, to Dave and Trina Misiak. She began acting at a young age, starring in theater productions and in high school, and she was named a Minnesota Scholar of Distinction in Theatre Arts. Misiak grew up between San Jose, California and Apple Valley, Minnesota, before relocating to Los Angeles to pursue an acting career. She worked as a waitress to support her acting career. She received a Bachelor of Fine Arts degree from the Ithaca College based in New York. She also attended foundation and improvisation courses, and is a member of SAG-AFTRA.

== Career ==
Misiak began her career by performing in theatres at various festivals. She also began to get roles in short films and television series on various television networks like NBC, CW, Netflix, and Verizon. She starred as the co-lead role in the music video "Pillow Talking". In 2019, Misiak was cast as a series regular on Dave as Ally Warner, the girlfriend of Dave / Lil Dicky. Dave premiered on March 4, 2020.

In 2024, she was cast as Maggie Quinn in the Fox TV series Going Dutch alongside Denis Leary and Danny Pudi.

== Other media ==
In November 2019, Misiak started her own Apple podcast with television writer Alyssa Litman called "Table Flipping with Alyssa and Taylor". The final episode aired in December 2021.

== Filmography ==
=== Film ===
Year	Title	Role	Notes
2011	"Eye Contact With Strangers"	Girl	Short film
2013	"The Playground"	The Spotter	Short film
2014	"Five Hours"	Savannah	
2017	"Pause"	Vanessa	Short film
2018	"Heavily Meditated"	Renee	
2023	"Somewhere In Between"	Emily	Short film
2026	Let's Have Kids!	Amanda	First feature film role

=== Television ===
Year	Title	Role	Notes
2013	"Social Media Misfits"	Taylor	1 episode
2015	"Laura"	Hannah	1 episode
2015	"About a Boy"	Co-ed	1 episode
2015	"Crazy Ex-Girlfriend"	Best Friend	1 episode
2018	"We Are CVNT5"	Zoe	8 episodes
2018	"American Vandal"	Abby Samuels	2 episodes
2018	"I Feel Bad"	Mackenzie	2 episodes
2020–2023	"Dave"	Ally	series regular
2024–2026	"Going Dutch"	Maggie Quinn	series regular
2026	"Tires"	Jill	Season 3; Recurring role
