= Molly (Lil Dicky song) =

Promotional single by Lil Dicky featuring Brendon Urie of Panic! at the Disco

from the album Professional Rapper
- Released: July 31, 2015
- Genre: Hip hop
- Length: 4:04
- Label: Commission; Dirty Burd; ADA
- Songwriter(s): Dave Burd; Nicholas Warwar; Vincent Venditto; Brendon Urie; William Rybak
- Producer(s): Yuri Beats; STREETRUNNER

Music video
- "Molly" on YouTube

"Molly" is a song by American rapper Lil Dicky featuring American singer Brendon Urie of Panic! at the Disco. Produced by Yuri Beats and STREETRUNNER, it was a released as a track from the former's debut studio album Professional Rapper on July 31, 2015.

== Background ==
The song title is the name of Dicky's ex-girlfriend, whom he considered his "soul mate". When asked about how the collaboration with Urie came about, Dicky responded by saying: "He tweeted at me one time, and I replied back telling him I was a fan, and then I had this song that I thought he could sound good on (Molly). He came in the studio that week, and man oh man…was he the perfect guy for the song."

The song is about how Dicky put his dreams above his relationship with Molly, his ex-girlfriend, and how he still reminisces on the good times they shared even if and when she gets married.

== Music video ==
The music video premiered on June 9, 2016, on Lil Dicky's YouTube account. The music was directed by Jamie Lees, and features Dicky as a dejected wedding guest as he watches his lost love get married, whilst Brendon Urie plays the role of the wedding singer. Logan Paul makes an appearance in the music video. As of September 2022, the music video has surpassed 75 million views.

== Certifications ==
Certifications for "Molly"
Region	Certification	Certified units/sales
New Zealand (RMNZ)	Gold	15,000^{‡}
^{‡} Sales+streaming figures based on certification alone.
