= Going Dutch (TV series) =

American television sitcom (2025–2026)

- Genre: Sitcom
- Created by: Joel Church-Cooper
- Showrunners: Joel Church-Cooper; Hilary Winston
- Starring: Denis Leary; Taylor Misiak; Danny Pudi; Laci Mosley; Hal Cumpston
- Music by: Gabe Witcher
- Country of origin: United States
- Original language: English
- No. of seasons: 2
- No. of episodes: 22

Production
- Executive producers: Denis Leary; Jack Leary; Joel Church-Cooper; Hilary Winston
- Producers: Edmund Sampson; Sean O'Riordan; Bill Malone
- Production location: Ireland
- Cinematography: Owen McPolin
- Editors: Tony Orcena; Mike Fly; Jordan Hayles; Kyle Martin
- Production companies: Red Lion Friday Productions; Amoeba Pictures; Fox Entertainment Studios; Gifted and Talented Camp

Original release
- Network: Fox
- Release: January 2, 2025 – April 23, 2026

Going Dutch is an American television sitcom created by Joel Church-Cooper and starring Denis Leary. The series premiered on Fox on January 2, 2025. In May 2025, the series was renewed for a second season, which premiered on January 15, 2026. In May 2026, the series was canceled after two seasons.

== Premise ==
After an offensive rant, Colonel Patrick Quinn is reassigned to lead Garrison Stroopsdorf, a military base in the Netherlands dubbed the "least important Army base in the world". Stroopsdorf has no strategic purpose or weapons, but instead boasts luxury resort-type amenities such as a Michelin Star–level commissary and the army's only fromagerie. Quinn tries to restore discipline and professionalism, but has to work with the base's former leader, his estranged daughter Maggie.

== Cast and characters ==
=== Main ===
- Denis Leary as Colonel Patrick Quinn, a high-ranking United States Army officer assigned to Stroopsdorf
- Taylor Misiak as Captain Maggie Quinn, Col. Quinn's estranged daughter and Stroopsdorf's former commanding officer
- Danny Pudi as XO Major Abraham Shah, Col. Quinn's loyal second-in-command
- Laci Mosley as Master Sergeant Dana Conway, a Stroopsdorf supply sergeant
- Hal Cumpston as Corporal Elias Papadakis, an undisciplined, overweight, and long-haired Stroopsdorf cyber operations specialist

=== Recurring ===
- Dempsey Bryk as Private Anthony "BA" Chapman, a serious but accident-prone Stroopsdorf soldier
- Arnmundur Ernst Björnsson as Jan, a civilian translator employed at the base
- Catherine Tate as Dr. Katja Vanderhoff, a local woman in whom Col. Quinn becomes interested. She is initially presumed to run a brothel, but she actually works at an immigration office for sex workers.
- Kristen Johnston as General Martin, a Canadian Army officer and romantic interest of Col. Quinn

=== Guests ===
- Joe Morton as Brigadier General (later promoted to Major General) Gerald Davidson, an officer who assumes command of the German base where Col. Quinn initially plans to take charge.
- Milana Vayntrub as Captain Celeste Shah, Major Shah's wife and an officer requesting a transfer to Stroopsdorf in an attempt to salvage her marriage with the Major.
- Lisa Edelstein as Nina Quinn, the Colonel's estranged wife
- Parker Young as CIA Special Agent Rick Silver

== Episodes ==
=== Series overview ===
Season	Episodes	Originally released	
Season	Episodes	First released	Last released
1	10	January 2, 2025	March 13, 2025
2	12	January 15, 2026	April 23, 2026

=== Season 1 (2025) ===
No. overall	No. in season	Title	Directed by	Written by	Original release date	Prod. code	U.S. viewers (millions)
1	1	"Pilot"	Trent O'Donnell	Joel Church-Cooper	January 2, 2025	101	1.31
Distinguished but self-absorbed U.S. Army Colonel Patrick Quinn and his executive officer Major Abraham Shah arrive at a base in Germany to assume command, only to find their superior, General Davidson, has taken charge due to Quinn going on an offensive rant caught by a body camera during a battle simulation. Quinn and Shah have been reassigned to Garrison Stroopsdorf in the Netherlands, which is full of "out-of-reg" soldiers and luxury resort-type amenities. Quinn tries to restore discipline but clashes with the base's former commanding officer, his estranged daughter, Captain Maggie Quinn. During a tulip festival, Quinn furiously rants about Stroopsdorf's lack of discipline when he sees the troops marching with a bowling sign. That evening, Maggie converses with her father about his absence, and she catches him shedding a tear. Stroopsdorf's weapons are finally found in storage.
2	2	"Tanks for Nothing"	Trent O'Donnell	Joel Church-Cooper	January 9, 2025	102	1.08
3	3	"CIA"	Jason Winer	Laura Moran	January 16, 2025	105	1.15
4	4	"Korfball"	Jason Winer	Jason Belleville	January 23, 2025	104	1.02
Colonel Patrick Quinn challenges local Dutch translator, Jan, to the game of korfball.
5	5	"Nazi Hunters"	Mo Marable	Rene Gube	January 30, 2025	103	1.03
6	6	"When You Wish Upon a Star"	Declan Lowney	Rene Gube & Natalie Rotter-Laitman	February 13, 2025	108	0.97
7	7	"Once Upon a Twice Christmas"	Kimmy Gatewood	Jonterri Gadson	February 20, 2025	107	0.83
8	8	"Trial of Jan"	Mo Marable	Laura Moran & Kirsten Rezazadeh-Jakob	February 27, 2025	106	0.83
It's the day of niksen at Stroopsdorf base and the colonel attempts to shut it down.
9	9	"The Exes of Evil"	Declan Lowney	Jason Belleville & Gian-Paul Bergeron	March 6, 2025	109	0.85
10	10	"Born on the Third of July"	Kimmy Gatewood	Joel Church-Cooper	March 13, 2025	110	0.84

=== Season 2 (2026) ===
No. overall	No. in season	Title	Directed by	Written by	Original release date	Prod. code
11	1	"The Laser's Edge"	Todd Biermann	Joel Church-Cooper	January 15, 2026	201
Major Shah and his estranged wife Captain Celeste Shah (Milana Vayntrub) attempt to reconcile while jealous Maggie tries to cope with the new development. Colonel Quinn is determined to defeat General Davidson's elite paratroopers in a battle simulation.
12	2	"Farmer's Mark-tet Offensive"	Trent O'Donnell	Hilary Winston	January 22, 2026	202
Major Shah and Papadakis collaborate to sell lobsters to ease the debt burden of Celeste. Katja and Colonel Quinn progressively escalate their conflict.
13	3	"There's No PX Like Home"	Lennon Parham	Gian-Paul Bergeron & Dan Rubin	January 29, 2026	206
14	4	"None of the Good Guys"	Kimmy Gatewood	Laura Moran	February 5, 2026	204
15	5	"The Canuck Stops Here"	Lennon Parham	Anthony Gioe & Nick Mandernach	February 12, 2026	205
General Quinn and Captain Quinn fight for the attention of Canadian NATO general, General Martin (Kristen Johnston). Shrek is banned at the base, much to the dismay of Papadakis and other soldiers.
16	6	"Swapadakis"	Kimmy Gatewood	Dan Rubin	February 26, 2026	203
Major Shah, in order to be on a vacation with Celeste, plans to replace himself with Papadakis for the weekend to keep Colonel Quinn occupied but things don't go according to the plan. Captain Maggie tries to distract herself from the growing romance between Shah and his wife.
17	7	"Twenty-Year Sitch"	Betsy Thomas	Katherine Laveaux & Laura Moran	March 5, 2026	207
Shah completes twenty years in the army and considers retiring. Colonel Quinn attempts to dissuade him from leaving the service. Maggie helps Celeste in celebrating Shah's milestone. Papadakis listens to an audiobook of the bible, voiced by Hank Azaria.
18	8	"Tinker, Tailor, Colonel, Spy"	Betsy Thomas	Joel Church-Cooper & Natalie Rotter-Laitman	March 12, 2026	208
19	9	"Apache Helicopter Parent"	Kabir Akhtar	Skyler Higley & Natalie Rotter-Laitman	April 2, 2026	209
20	10	"The Heart Locker"	Kimmy Gatewood	Anthony Gioe & Nick Mandernach	April 9, 2026	210
21	11	"General Dearest"	Kabir Akhtar	Hilary Winston	April 16, 2026	211
22	12	"NATOcean's Eleven"	Kimmy Gatewood	Joel Church-Cooper	April 23, 2026	212

== Production ==
The series was first announced in January 2024, with Leary serving as an executive producer. In May 2024, it was announced that Leary was set to star in the series. In September 2024, other actors, including Pudi, were announced as cast members. In October 2024, it was announced that Morton and Tate were cast in the series. The series was shot entirely in Ireland; a real Irish Army base was used as the primary filming location.

On May 7, 2025, Fox renewed the series for a second season. On August 27, 2025, Hilary Winston joined the second season as a co-showrunner alongside series' creator and showrunner of the first season Joel Church-Cooper. Winston is also expected to serve as an executive producer. On September 4, 2025, Kristen Johnston was cast in a recurring role for the second season. On May 4, 2026, Fox canceled the series after two seasons.

== Release ==
Going Dutch premiered on Fox on January 2, 2025. It became available to stream on Hulu on the following day. The second season premiered on January 15, 2026.

== Reception ==
=== Critical response ===
The review aggregator website Rotten Tomatoes reported an 80% approval rating with an average rating of 7/10, based on 10 critic reviews. The website's critics consensus reads, "A vehicle for Denis Leary's cranky charm that generously spreads the wealth amongst its likable ensemble, Going Dutch could use more discipline but shows plenty of potential." Metacritic, which uses a weighted average, assigned a score of 63 out of 100 based on 6 critics, indicating "generally favorable" reviews.

Tania Hussain of Collider rated the series a 9 out of 10 and said, "With a terrific pairing of irreverence and spirit, Going Dutch is an unpretentious must-watch for anyone looking to laugh hard this season." Daniel Fienberg of The Hollywood Reporter gave the series a mixed review and wrote as the bottom line: "Great cast, solid premise, but could have used some cable edge." Alison Herman of Variety also gave the series a mixed review and described it as "easily amuses" yet "Like a wheel of aging gouda, other elements of Going Dutch may need more time to mature." Cristina Escobar of RogerEbert.com gave the series a negative review and stated, "There certainly aren't a lot of jokes—nothing that made me so much as smile in its first two installments." Robert Lloyd of the Los Angeles Times gave the series a positive review and stated, "I was a little doubtful to begin with but really did enjoy it…" Tara Ariano of Cracked.com also gave the series a positive review and commented, "But as an accidental quasi-sequel (to Enlisted), Going Dutch is already satisfying in many of the same ways."

=== Depiction of the Netherlands and Dutch culture ===
The series has been criticized for its inaccurate depiction of the Netherlands, Dutch culture and the Dutch language. The Dutch public broadcaster NOS criticized the show for portraying the Netherlands through a barrage of exaggerated clichés and distortions, relying heavily on stereotypical imagery. According to NOS, the production made little effort to portray the Netherlands accurately, noting that elements of Dutch culture are casually and erroneously mixed with German ones (for example in national costumes and fictional place names) and that there was virtually no Dutch involvement in the series, which was largely filmed in Ireland with non-Dutch actors portraying Dutch characters. The Dutch newspaper De Telegraaf described the series as an affront to Dutch culture.

The Dutch language and Dutch accents portrayed in the series have been described as plain wrong, a mishmash or comically incorrect, with British actress Catherine Tate, playing local character Dr. Katja Vanderhoff, employing a hissing, slisping accent and most other characters speaking English or Dutch with stereotypically Scandinavian or German-sounding accents rather than authentic Dutch ones. The base name Stroopsdorf notably combines "stroop" (from the Dutch stroopwafel, a popular delicacy) with the German word for village. Critics further noted the general absence of genuine Dutch input or actors, with the production opting for the only major Dutch character to be portrayed by Icelandic actor Arnmundur Ernst Björnsson, whose accent in both Dutch and English has been described as German.

The series was shot entirely in Ireland, with an Irish Army base as the primary location and additional villages for exterior shots. No on-location filming in the Netherlands occurred, resulting in scenery, architecture, and elements of daily life that do not match those of the Netherlands.

=== Ratings ===
Viewership and ratings per episode of Going Dutch
No.	Title	Air date	Rating/share (18–49)	Viewers (millions)	DVR (18–49)	DVR viewers (millions)	Total (18–49)	Total viewers (millions)	Ref.
1	"Pilot"	January 2, 2025	0.2/2	1.31	0.1	0.90	0.3	2.20	
2	"Tanks for Nothing"	January 9, 2025	0.2/2	1.08	0.1	0.86	0.3	1.95	
3	"CIA"	January 16, 2025	0.2/3	1.15	0.1	0.64	0.3	1.79	
4	"Korfball"	January 23, 2025	0.2/3	1.02	0.1	0.70	0.3	1.72	
5	"Nazi Hunters"	January 30, 2025	0.1/2	1.03	0.1	0.66	0.2	1.69	
6	"When You Wish Upon a Star"	February 13, 2025	0.2/2	0.97	0.1	0.60	0.2	1.57	
7	"Once Upon a Twice Christmas"	February 20, 2025	0.1/1	0.83	0.1	0.56	0.2	1.39	
8	"Trial of Jan"	February 27, 2025	0.2/2	0.83	0.0	0.46	0.2	1.29	
9	"The Exes of Evil"	March 6, 2025	0.1/2	0.85	0.1	0.49	0.2	1.34	
10	"Born on the Third of July"	March 13, 2025	0.1/2	0.84	0.0	0.45	0.2	1.29	
