= Sweet Dreams (2024 film) =

2024 sports comedy directed by Lije Sarki

- Theatrical release poster
- Directed by: Lije Sarki
- Written by: Lije Sarki
- Story by: Lije Sarki and Eric Gross
- Produced by: Robert Odgen Barnum; Lucas Jarach; Lije Jarki; Ari Basile
- Starring: Johnny Knoxville; Mo Amer; GaTa; Bobby Lee; Theo Von; Brian Van Holt; Jon Park; Shakewell; Adam Faison; Erik Anthony Gonzales; Beth Grant; Jay Mohr; Kate Upton
- Cinematography: Sing Howe Yam
- Edited by: Ken O’Keefe
- Music by: Daniel Davies
- Production companies: 1993; The Barnum Picture Company
- Distributed by: Paramount Pictures
- Release date: April 12, 2024
- Running time: 99 minutes
- Country: United States
- Language: English

Sweet Dreams is a 2024 American sports comedy drama film directed by Lije Sarki. The film stars Johnny Knoxville as a recovering alcoholic who forms a softball team with other patients at his rehab center to save the clinic from being sold.

== Plot ==
After waking up bloodied on a park bench due to a long night of drinking, Morris decides to check into the Sweet Dreams rehab center for a 90-day recovery program. At first he struggles to acclimate, but eventually Morris bonds with his fellow patients over softball.

When Pete, the owner of Sweet Dreams, learns that he is in danger of losing the clinic, the patients enter a local softball tournament in hopes that the prize money will prevent the center from being sold at auction.

== Cast ==
- Johnny Knoxville as Morris Peters, a recovering alcoholic
- Mo Amer as Pete, the owner of the Sweet Dreams rehab center
- Jay Mohr as Frank, a former film industry executive undergoing treatment at Sweet Dreams
- GaTa as Jake
- Bobby Lee as Cruise
- Brian Van Holt as Mike D
- Jonnie Park as Dip
- Shakewell as Cedric
- Adam Faison as Stew
- Erik Anthony Gonzalez as Diego
- Kate Upton as Kat
- Theo Von as Garvey
- Anderson .Paak as D Squiz
- Beth Grant as Sandra

== Production ==
Sweet Dreams was inspired by director and screenwriter Lije Sarki's own experiences with sobriety. The film was shot in Los Angeles, including many real-life locations in the Westside.

== Release ==
A "Friends & Family" screening of Sweet Dreams for the cast, crew, and guests was hosted in Los Angeles by Paramount Pictures on April 1, 2024. The film was released in theaters on April 12 and became available on digital streaming platforms on April 16.

== Reception ==
On the review aggregator website Rotten Tomatoes, 69% of 16 critics' reviews are positive, with an average rating of 6.4/10.
