= Christine Ko =

American actress (born 1988)

- Born: 1988 or 1989 (age 37–38); Chicago, Illinois, U.S.
- Education: Georgia State University
- Occupation: Actress
- Years active: 2012–present
- Spouse: Alan Yang
- Father: Frankie Kao

Chinese name
- Traditional Chinese: 葛曉潔
- Simplified Chinese: 葛晓洁
Transcriptions
Standard Mandarin
- Hanyu Pinyin: Gé Xiǎojié
- Wade–Giles: Ko^{2} Hsiao^{3}-chieh^{2}

Christine Ko (Chinese: 葛曉潔; born 1988 or 1989) is an American actress, known for her roles as Emma on the CBS sitcom The Great Indoors, Mandi on Upload and Emma on Dave. Before her success in America, she had a brief career in Taiwan in the early 2010s.

== Early life ==
Ko was born in 1988 in Chicago, Illinois. She grew up in both Taiwan and Atlanta. She is the daughter of Taiwanese entertainer Frankie Kao. Ko initially pursued a career in finance before transitioning to acting.

== Career ==
Ko has discussed the issue of limited roles for Asian American actors in the United States. Her role on The Great Indoors was originally written for a blond woman, but Ko's agent was able to get her an audition. After her audition, the producers changed their original idea of Emma's appearance. Ko said, "I think that's true diversity. You're just like everybody else. You just look Asian... It's the norm and how we all live. We just haven't seen it in Hollywood yet."

Ko joined the cast of the television series Hawaii Five-0 part way into its eighth season. She also guest-starred in the HBO comedy series Ballers. She starred on the FXX series Dave alongside Dave Burd.

In 2021, she starred alongside Canadian singer Justin Bieber in the music video of his song "Hold On".

In 2022, she joined the cast of The Handmaid's Tale.

== Filmography ==
=== Film ===
Year	Title	Role
2017	The Jade Pendant	May
2018	Grandmother's Gold	Mona
2019	Extracurricular Activities	Amy
2020	Tigertail	Angela
2020	Blinders	Sam
2024	Mabel	Angela
2026	Drag	
2026	Rolling Loud	Linda

=== Television ===
Year	Title	Role	Notes
2012	Hollywood Heights	Brenda	2 episodes
2015	Ballers	Anna	Episode: "Saturdaze"
2016–2017	The Great Indoors	Emma	Series regular
2017	Adam Ruins Everything	Tiffany	Episode: "Adam Ruins the Hospital"
2018	Hawaii Five-0	Jessie Nomura	Recurring role; 6 episodes
2018	Deception	Vivian Song	Episode: "Divination"
2019	No Good Nick	Ms. Chang	2 episodes
2020	Stumptown	Cameron Dorsey	Episode: "All Quiet On The Dextern Front"
2020–2023	Dave	Emma	Series regular
2020	Upload	Mandi	Recurring role
2021	Master of None	Ashley	1 episode
2021	Sweet Pecan Summer	Amanda	Hallmark Channel
2021	Just Beyond	Ms. Fausse	Episode: "Unfiltered"
2022	Only Murders in the Building	Nina Lin	Recurring role
2022	The Handmaid's Tale	Lily	Recurring role
2025	Common Side Effects	Kiki	Voice role
2025	Loot	Petra	Episode: "Hail Mary Time"

== Personal life ==
Ko is married to Parks & Recreation writer and producer Alan Yang.
