= Mabel (film) =

2024 American drama film by Nicholas Ma

- Theatrical release poster
- Directed by: Nicholas Ma
- Written by: Joy Goodwin; Nicholas Ma
- Produced by: Helen Estabrook; Luca Borghesde; Ben Howe
- Starring: Lexi Perkel; Christine Ko; Judy Greer
- Cinematography: Mark Jeevaratnam
- Edited by: Alex Kopit; Arturo Sosa
- Music by: Tom Kingston
- Production companies: AgX; Wavelength
- Distributed by: Tribeca Releasing
- Release dates: April 28, 2024 (San Francisco Film Festival); April 17, 2026 (United States)
- Country: United States
- Language: English

Mabel is a 2024 American drama film directed by Nicholas Ma from a screenplay he co-wrote with Joy Goodwin. It stars newcomer Lexi Perkel as Callie, a young girl whose best friend is a plant named Mabel. Christine Ko also stars as her mother.

== Premise ==
Callie is a very lonely young girl. When her dad's job moves the family to a sterile subdivision, she is isolated with her best friend, a potted plant named Mabel.

== Cast ==
- Lexi Perkel as Callie
- Christine Ko as Angela, Callie's mother
- Judy Greer as Mrs. G
- Quincy Dunn-Baker as David
- Lena Josephine Marano as Agnes
- Jim Santangeli as Brian

== Production ==
In July 2021, a casting call was released and the film's producers offered to pay people to shoot scenes inside of their homes. That same month, Judy Greer and Christine Ko joined the cast, and by August, newcomer Lexi Perkel was cast in the film's lead role.

== Release ==
Mabel premiered at the San Francisco Film Festival on April 28, 2024. The film was released in the United States by Tribeca Releasing on April 17, 2026.

== Reception ==
A review at The Moveable Feat stated, "Beyond their rich performances, there’s a depth of feeling in Mark Jeevaratnam’s delicately observational camerawork punctuated by vivid colorful flourishes and a lovely score from Tom Kingston where the strings can convey a sense of longing or nimble thought as characters face the unknown in approaching each other, and when the kind of growth Ma charts isn’t always visible to a camera, “Mabel” really blossoms when reflecting how becoming your own person isn’t necessarily something that has to be done alone."
