= Professional Rapper (song) =

Single by Lil Dicky featuring Snoop Dogg

from the album Professional Rapper
- Released: July 31, 2015
- Recorded: 2015
- Genre: Hip hop
- Length: 5:34
- Label: Commission; Dirty Burd
- Songwriters: Calvin Broadus; David Burd
- Producer: Stan Lane

Lil Dicky singles chronology
"Save Dat Money" (2015)	"Professional Rapper" (2015)	"Just a Lil' Thick (She Juicy)" (2016)

Snoop Dogg singles chronology
"My Cutie Pie" (2015)	"Professional Rapper" (2015)	"Back Up" (2015)

Music video
- "Professional Rapper" on YouTube

"Professional Rapper" is a song by American rapper Lil Dicky from his debut studio album of the same name. It was released on July 31, 2015 as the album's fourth single and title track. It was produced by Stan Lane and features a guest appearance by West Coast hip hop artist Snoop Dogg.

== Commercial performance ==
"Professional Rapper" debuted at number-one on the Billboard Comedy Digital Tracks chart dated August 22, 2015.

== Background ==
The song is presented as Lil Dicky interviewing for a job as a professional rapper with Snoop Dogg. In the interview, Snoop Dogg asks Lil Dicky about his background as well as what he likes about rap. Lil Dicky says one of his favorite things is autographing women's breasts. He also states he wants to approach rapping different because he feels it's been done the same way for too long, to which Snoop Dogg replies that it traditionally works. Lil Dicky proceeds to say one of his goals is to become one of the greats. At the end, Snoop Dogg says he has the job, if he can put together a hook for "this" song, in a self-aware meta sense referring to Professional Rapper. Lil Dicky puts together a hook, which is called "garbage" by Snoop Dogg.

== Music video ==
The music video is animated. The video plays out the lyrics to the song as part of the fictional interview portrayed in the lyrics. During the line “ Well, I don't care about the money/Like, it's the respect that I'm wanting/Honestly, I just want to be one of the greats/Where they gotta bring your boy up every debate” Snoop Dogg and Lil Dicky are standing in front of pictures of rap legends including Eminem, 2Pac, The Notorious B.I.G., and Jay-Z.

== Chart performance ==
Chart (2015)	Peak position
US Comedy Digital Tracks (Billboard)	1

== Certifications ==
Region	Certification	Certified units/sales
New Zealand (RMNZ)	Gold	15,000^{‡}
United States (RIAA)	Platinum	1,000,000^{‡}
^{‡} Sales+streaming figures based on certification alone.
