= Save Dat Money =

Single by Lil Dicky featuring Fetty Wap and Rich Homie Quan

from the album Professional Rapper
- Released: June 10, 2015
- Recorded: 2014
- Genre: Comedy hip hop
- Length: 4:51
- Label: Commission; Dirty Burd
- Songwriters: David Burd; Willie Maxwell II; Dequantes Lamar; Matthew Washington
- Producer: Money Alwayz

Lil Dicky singles chronology
"White Crime" (2014)	"Save Dat Money" (2015)	"Professional Rapper" (2015)

Fetty Wap singles chronology
"Around The World" (2015)	"Save Dat Money" (2015)	"679" (2015)

Rich Homie Quan singles chronology
"Ride Out" (2015)	"Save Dat Money" (2015)	"The Most" (2016)

"Save Dat Money" (stylized as $ave Dat Money), is a novelty song by American rapper Lil Dicky featuring fellow American rappers Fetty Wap and Rich Homie Quan. The track is a single from Dicky's debut studio album Professional Rapper. It was released on June 10, 2015 as the album's third single. It was produced by Money Alwayz and peaked at number 71 on the Billboard Hot 100.

== Music video ==
The music video premiered on September 17, 2015 on Lil Dicky's YouTube account. It was directed by Tony Yacenda and produced by Jim Cummings. The video describes Dicky wanting to make the "best rap video ever" without spending any money. Throughout the video, he goes door-to-door through the mansions of Beverly Hills, asking owners if he can use their homes for a quick fifteen minutes to film it. Mrs. "K" agrees, allowing them to use her home in the video. He asks a Lamborghini dealership to borrow a car, and a boater to borrow a boat owned by Freddie Avila a.k.a. AvilaVIP, as well as models. As the title suggests, he doesn't spend a dime. In fact, he earns $600 because of the product placement he exchanged everything for.

Fetty Wap and Rich Homie Quan also appear performing onstage with Dicky in the video. The video features cameos from T-Pain, Sarah Silverman, Abbi Jacobson, Ilana Glazer, Kevin Durant, Hannibal Buress, Dillon Francis, Mark Cuban, and Tom Petty in one of his final appearances.

== Chart performance ==
Chart (2015)	Peak position
Canada Hot 100 (Billboard)	54
US Billboard Hot 100	71
US Hot R&B/Hip-Hop Songs (Billboard)	23

== Certifications ==
Region	Certification	Certified units/sales
New Zealand (RMNZ)	Gold	15,000^{‡}
United States (RIAA)	2× Platinum	2,000,000^{‡}
^{‡} Sales+streaming figures based on certification alone.
