= Dave (TV series) =

American comedy TV series

- Genre: Sitcom; Comedy drama
- Created by: Dave Burd; Jeff Schaffer
- Starring: Dave Burd; Taylor Misiak; GaTa; Andrew Santino; Travis Bennett; Christine Ko
- Opening theme: "Hi, I'm Dave" by: Dave Burd; Jasper Lee Harris; Jahnei Clarke
- Composers: Henry Kwapis; Jack Karaszewski; Jasper Harris
- Country of origin: United States
- Original language: English
- No. of seasons: 3
- No. of episodes: 30

Production
- Executive producers: Dave Burd; Jeff Schaffer; Saladin K. Patterson; Greg Mottola; Kevin Hart; Marty Bowen; Scooter Braun; Mike Hertz; Scott Manson; James Shin; Wyck Godfrey
- Producers: Chris Smirnoff; Melanie Elin; Corey Omer
- Cinematography: Brian Lannin
- Running time: 24–32 minutes
- Production companies: Dirty Burd; Matthew 6:33; SB Projects; Temple Hill Entertainment; Hartbeat Productions; Chicken Sticks; FXP

Original release
- Network: FXX
- Release: March 4, 2020 – May 31, 2023

Dave (stylized as DAVE) is an American television sitcom that premiered on FXX on March 4, 2020. It was co-created by rapper/comedian Dave Burd (known by his stage name "Lil Dicky"), who plays the titular character, and Jeff Schaffer. Kevin Hart, Greg Mottola, and Scooter Braun are producers on the series. Lil Dicky's real-life hype man, GaTa, co-stars as himself. On May 11, 2020, the series was renewed for a second season, which premiered on June 16, 2021. On February 17, 2022, FXX renewed the series for a third season, which premiered on April 5, 2023. On February 1, 2024, FX announced that there were no plans to renew the series for a fourth season with Burd pursuing other projects.

== Premise ==
The series stars a fictionalized version of Lil Dicky, a suburban neurotic Jewish man in his late twenties who has convinced himself he is destined to be one of the best rappers of all time.

== Cast ==
=== Main ===
- Dave Burd as David "Dave" Burd / "Lil Dicky", an aspiring rapper from suburban Philadelphia
- Taylor Misiak as Ally Wernick, a kindergarten-turned-high school teacher, Dave's girlfriend/ex-girlfriend
- GaTa as Davionte "GaTa" Ganter, Dave's on-stage hype man and a rapper, who lives with bipolar disorder
- Andrew Santino as Mike, Dave's roommate and later manager
- Travis "Taco" Bennett as Elliot "Elz", Dave's childhood friend, a sound engineer, producer, and DJ
- Christine Ko as Emma Wu, Ally's roommate and friend, as well as Dave's graphic designer and former coworker

=== Recurring ===
- Gina Hecht as Carol Burd, Dave's mom
- David Paymer as Don Burd, Dave's dad
- Carlease Burke as Catherine Ganter, GaTa's aunt and adoptive mother
- Benny Blanco as himself, Dave's friend and producer
- T.K. Carter as Cliff (season 3), Dave's driver on his "Looking for Love" tour
- Chloe Bennet as Robyn (season 3), a photographer and Dave's love interest he meets in Wisconsin
- Inga Cadranel as Ava (season 3), Dave's new publicist and later Mike's girlfriend
- Rachel McAdams as herself (season 3), a popular "movie star" whom Dave befriends

=== Guest appearances ===
Dave features many celebrity cameos and guest appearances.

==== Season 1 ====
- YG
- Macklemore
- Trippie Redd
- Young Thug
- Gunna
- MadeinTYO
- O.T. Genasis
- Charlamagne tha God
- Tierra Whack
- Angela Yee
- Ninja
- Justin Bieber
- Kourtney Kardashian
- Marshmello

==== Season 2 ====
- CL
- Hailey Bieber
- Kendall Jenner
- Kyle Kuzma
- Zack Bia
- Kareem Abdul-Jabbar
- Doja Cat
- Rae Sremmurd
- J Balvin
- Zach King
- Lil Yachty
- Desiigner
- Dave East
- Denzel Curry
- DJ Drama
- Kevin Hart
- Lil Nas X

==== Season 3 ====
- Usher
- Rick Ross
- Demi Lovato
- Don Cheadle
- Machine Gun Kelly
- Megan Fox
- Killer Mike
- Travis Barker
- Jack Harlow
- Lil Gotit
- Emma Chamberlain
- David Dobrik
- Finneas O'Connell
- Brad Pitt as Luke Bradley "Brad" Pitt
- Drake

== Episodes ==
Season	Episodes	Originally released	
Season	Episodes	First released	Last released
1	10	March 4, 2020	April 29, 2020
2	10	June 16, 2021	August 11, 2021
3	10	April 5, 2023	May 31, 2023

=== Season 1 (2020) ===
No. overall	No. in season	Title	Directed by	Written by	Original release date	Prod. code	U.S. viewers (millions)
1	1	"The Gander"	Greg Mottola	Dave Burd and Jeff Schaffer	March 4, 2020	XXLD01001	0.292
Dave meets GaTa and tries to get YG on one of his songs.
2	2	"Dave's First"	Greg Mottola	Yamara Taylor	March 4, 2020	XXLD01002	0.220
Dave's first live performance is at a memorial for a 10-year old fan; Dave struggles with comparisons to other white rappers.
3	3	"Hypospadias"	Greg Mottola	Dave Burd	March 11, 2020	XXLD01003	0.163
Dave and Ally have intimacy issues and the origin of the Lil Dicky moniker is examined.
4	4	"Somebody..."	Tony Yacenda	Luvh Rakhe	March 18, 2020	XXLD01004	0.199
Mike starts to manage Dave as a side hustle. Dave gets sick after sharing a joint with Young Thug at a party Emma invited them to. GaTa introduces Elz to Trippie Redd.
5	5	"Hype Man"	Tony Yacenda	Saladin Patterson	March 25, 2020	XXLD01006	0.210
Dave hires GaTa as his hype man and prepares to open for Meek Mill in Philadelphia. In several flashbacks, GaTa is shown to have severe mood issues, and eventually confesses to Dave, Mike, and Elz that he has bipolar disorder and is on medication.
6	6	"Talent Shows"	Andrew DeYoung	Dave Burd	April 1, 2020	XXLD01007	0.167
Dave, GaTa, Mike, and Elz stay in Dave's parents' house in Philadelphia. Dave invites his old camp friends but comes to a realization about their true intentions with help from Elz. In several flashbacks, a young Dave performs at his summer camp and pinpoints that moment as when he started believing in himself.
7	7	"What Wood You Wear?"	Andrew DeYoung	Alex Russell	April 8, 2020	XXLD01005	0.130
Emma's car is broken into after spending the night with Elz, who spends the day babysitting Trippie Redd's nephew. GaTa figures out that Emma and Elz have been hooking up, leading to Emma denying it and hurting Elz's feelings. Emma later apologizes to Elz at a silent disco he was DJing for and the two make up.
8	8	"PIBE"	Andrew DeYoung	Max Searle	April 15, 2020	XXLD01008	0.295
Dave and Mike meet with labels about a record deal, and Dave later meets Justin Bieber and Benny Blanco. At a house party of Bieber's, Dave becomes acquainted with Kourtney Kardashian. Ally and Elz watch a football game together at a bar before crashing the house party, where Elz starts a fight with Marshmello.
9	9	"Ally's Toast"	Ben Sinclair	Vanessa McGee	April 22, 2020	XXLD01009	0.237
Dave accompanies Ally to her sister's wedding in the Napa Valley. Dave fails to be mentally and emotionally present for Ally while he is distracted by a potential career move. Dave eventually accuses Ally of having no ambition, and the two break up before Dave returns to Los Angeles alone.
10	10	"Jail"	Tony Yacenda	Dave Burd	April 29, 2020	XXLD01010	0.213
Dave wants his label to put out a long, offensive track as his first single; Mike and the label both disagree, and he decides to go on The Breakfast Club in New York City to leak the track. Dave finally heeds his friends' advice and decides to rap live on the show instead, earning the respect of Charlamagne tha God.

=== Season 2 (2021) ===
No. overall	No. in season	Title	Directed by	Written by	Original release date	Prod. code	U.S. viewers (millions)
11	1	"International Gander"	Jake Schreier	Lee Sung Jin	June 16, 2021	XXLD02001	0.180
Dave, Mike, GaTa, and Dave's intern Dan are making a video with CL in South Korea. Dave posts a picture with CL on Instagram, but GaTa photobombs while holding a joint, not knowing that marijuana is a heavily controlled substance in the country. Dan is taken off the train by police while holding Dave's backpack with his laptop while the foursome try to contact CL to apologize, and the rest try to track him down. A heated confrontation in the police station reveals that Dave's laptop has no songs.
12	2	"Antsy"	Ben Sinclair	Luvh Rakhe	June 16, 2021	XXLD02002	0.164
Dave, Mike, and GaTa return to a Los Angeles home provided by the record label. A creator's block-saddled Dave attends Elz' birthday party, where he is expecting to see Ally for the first time since their breakup. Dave ultimately does not see Ally, but brings a woman home later.
13	3	"The Observer"	Ben Sinclair	Max Searle	June 23, 2021	XXLD02004	0.163
Dave's immature bromance with Benny Blanco leads to an uncomfortable conversation with GaTa about white privilege. Mike attempts to find the source of a note left on his trash bin and film the offender. Dave pays a visit to Ally.
14	4	"Kareem Abdul-Jabbar"	Kitao Sakurai	Biniam Bizuneh	June 30, 2021	XXLD02005	0.130
Dave attempts to nail an interview with NBA legend Kareem Abdul-Jabbar after the latter is confused about a joke in one of the former's music videos. Mike takes on a duo of TikTokers as clients. GaTa has an audition.
15	5	"Bar Mitzvah"	Ben Sinclair	Dave Burd	July 7, 2021	XXLD02006	0.152
Dave and Elz, who have grown apart, are at odds during a Bar Mitzvah performance. GaTa's car is towed after a hookup and he is forced to wander Los Angeles looking for a place to charge his phone so he can track it down. Dave and Elz are kicked out of the Bar Mitzvah after encouraging the kids to loosen up, but GaTa saves the day by including the kids in an impromptu performance outside the house.
16	6	"Somebody Date Me"	Tayarisha Poe	Alex Russell	July 14, 2021	XXLD02003	0.165
Dave is distracted during a visit from his parents after matching with Doja Cat on a dating app and texting her all day.
17	7	"Ad Man"	Tony Yacenda	April Shih	July 21, 2021	XXLD02007	0.166
Dave has trouble building up confidence freestyling for the XXL Freshman Class, and his past working in an advertising agency with Emma is explored as the latter also tries to work out her professional identity.
18	8	"The Burds"	Tony Yacenda	Vanessa McGee	July 28, 2021	XXLD02008	0.124
The record label kicks Dave and Mike out of the Hollywood Hills house they have been residing in after finding out Dave has made no progress on his album. Dave and Mike move in with Dave's parents, who bicker constantly, and Dave's attempt to fix the situation makes it even worse. Dave's mom tells him to stop being so selfish, causing him to break down after realizing he knows nothing about his parents. Meanwhile, Mike finds a song Dave wrote for Ally following their breakup and wants it on the album to demonstrate Dave's growth as an artist. Dave ultimately shows the song to Ally in a bid to reunite after realizing their breakup is the source of his creator's block, but is rejected and leaves despondent.
19	9	"Enlightened Dave"	Kitao Sakurai	Luvh Rakhe & Lee Sung Jin	August 4, 2021	XXLD02009	0.105
Dave goes to Rick Rubin's house and meets Biff Wiff and Atoms (Ben Sinclair), supposed assistants of Rubin's who have Dave spend time in a sensory deprivation tank. Dave has multiple hallucinations featuring his friends and a bald, naked version of himself. After the duo inadvertently leave Dave in the tank too long and he nearly drowns, Dave is inspired and he runs as quickly as he can to record new music.
20	10	"Dave"	Alma Har'el	Dave Burd	August 11, 2021	XXLD02010	0.152
GaTa leaves his house after finding out his mother is putting his younger sister on the mortgage. Dave runs into a problem when Ariana Grande releases a surprise album the same day he releases his album, causing it to chart lower than it would. GaTa attempts to tell Dave that he isn't appreciating his success enough - that the album is charting, and he has an upcoming performance at the VMA's, but Dave is unfazed. A second confrontation with GaTa leads to a fight with GaTa calling out Dave's privilege and that he always sticks up for him regardless. Dave ultimately shares the VMA stage with GaTa as his equal and the two later tour together under the name "Dave" - also short for GaTa's first name, Davionte.

=== Season 3 (2023) ===
No. overall	No. in season	Title	Directed by	Written by	Original release date	Prod. code	U.S. viewers (millions)
21	1	"Texas"	Brian Lannin	Luvh Rakhe & Randall Valdez Castill	April 5, 2023	XXLD03001	0.137
Dave starts out his tour with antics from the road as he deals with some of his obsessive fans and Emma making a documentary about him.
22	2	"Harrison Ave"	Kitao Sakurai	Jordan Mendoza	April 5, 2023	XXLD03003	0.080
Dave goes back home to record a music video about his first love and heartbreak, when the woman the song is about makes a surprise visit and he must confront his past.
23	3	"Hearsay"	Tony Yacenda	Biniam Bizuneh	April 12, 2023	XXLD03002	0.133
Dave meets Rick Ross at a club, where Ross lends Dave an expensive gold chain. Later that night, Dave and Gata are mugged, leaving them needing to negotiate with the thieves to get back the chain.
24	4	"Wisconsin"	Ben Sinclair	Emma Wisdom	April 19, 2023	XXLD03004	0.111
Ally joins the crew along the tour in Michigan, where she goes on a date with an old flame. Meanwhile, Dave is still looking for his own love and thinks he may have found it when he meets the photographer Robyn.
25	5	"The Storm"	Shannon Murphy	Rob Rosell	April 26, 2023	XXLD03005	0.105
After an incident at a show with one of his fans, Dave goes to her house to apologize before a hurricane hits the area, leaving Dave and his crew stranded at her house. Dave deals with the family's conservative and Christian values that heavily differ from his own.
26	6	"#RIPLilDicky"	Ben Sinclair	Starlee Kine	May 3, 2023	XXLD03006	0.082
While Dave and the crew step out of the tour bus for a few minutes, rats chew through the wires and the bus explodes, stranding them out in the desert. Afterwards, a few people find the bus, and thinking Dave died in the explosion, post a video about it online. Leaving all of social media to believe Dave is dead. Since his death causes a spike in his album sales, they decide to play along with the misunderstanding for a few days.
27	7	"Rebirthday"	Tony Yacenda	Jeanie Bergen	May 10, 2023	XXLD03007	0.111
After Dave officially ends his tour, Robyn visits him in Los Angeles and they attempt to have a nice romantic day before Ally tells Robyn to try to get Dave to the beach for a surprise party.
28	8	"Met Gala"	Kitao Sakurai	Niles Abston & Trevor Alper	May 17, 2023	XXLD03008	0.094
Dave attends his first Met Gala and has to deal with troubling interactions with celebrities while trying to perform a stunt with his experimental outfit.
29	9	"Dream Girl"	Shannon Murphy	Vanessa McGee	May 24, 2023	XXLD03009	0.119
Dave has a difficult time trying to choose between Robyn, who wants to make their relationship official, and Rachel McAdams, Dave's dream girl whose number he got at the Met Gala. Tensions rise as Emma premieres her documentary about the tour.
30	10	"Looking for Love"	Kitao Sakurai	Story by : Dave Burd & Vanessa McGee; Teleplay by : Dave Burd	May 31, 2023	XXLD03010	0.096
Dave meets Brad Pitt during a music video shoot, where Pitt tells Dave that he wants to try making music and Dave invites him over to jam. But when Pitt finally goes to Dave's house for the jam session, they have to deal with an obsessive staff member on the music video which turns into a full blown hostage situation.

== Music ==
Penith (The Dave Soundtrack)

Studio album / soundtrack album by Lil Dicky
- Released: January 19, 2024
- Length: 66:00
- Labels: Dirty Burd; Commission; BMG
- Producers: Alex Goldblatt; Benny Blanco; Carter Lang; Cashmere Cat; Chatz; Chill Pill; D.A. Doman; Davey Alexander Miramontez; Digi; Dylan Brady; Eugene Tsai; Henry Kwapis; Jack Karaszewski; Jahnei Clarke; Jasper Lee Harris; Lewis Hughes; Lex; Lia Liza; Nicholas Audino; ROB; Sarcastic Sounds; Smash David; Stan Lane; Swish; Tom Levesque; Tommy Parker

Lil Dicky chronology
I'm Brain (as Brain) (2017)	Penith (The Dave Soundtrack) (2024)

Singles from Penith (The Dave Soundtrack)
- 1. "Hi, I'm Dave" Released: February 28, 2020; 2. "We Good" Released: December 24, 2021; 3. "Mr. McAdams" Released: December 15, 2023

In June 2023, Burd stated that a soundtrack album for Dave would be released "by the end of this summer", featuring music from the three seasons of the series. He was working with Benny Blanco on the album and anticipated it would have up to 20 songs, noting that the series featured "bits and pieces of songs" that he had created full versions of that were unreleased and thus needed to be mixed and mastered. In December 2023, Penith (The Dave Soundtrack) was announced, for release on January 19, 2024. "Mr. McAdams" was released as the album's first single on December 15, 2023.

=== Track listing ===
Penith (The Dave Soundtrack)
No.	Title	Writer(s)	Producer(s)	Length
1.	"Brand New"	David Burd; Dylan Brady	Brady; Benny Blanco^{[a]}	1:18
2.	"Honestly"	Burd; Eugene Tsai; Lia Elizabeth Farrelly-Hodge; Davey Alexander Miramontez; Jasper Lee Harris	Tsai; Lia Liza; Stan Lane; Harris; Blanco^{[a]}	3:46
3.	"Mr. McAdams"	Burd; Benjamin Levin; Sidney Swift; Alexander C. Goodwin	Blanco; Chill Pill; Lex	2:36
4.	"Hahaha"	Burd; Harris; Jahnei Clarke	Blanco; Clarke; Harris	4:03
5.	"Ally's Song"	Burd; Henry Kwapis; Jack Karaszewski	Kwapis; Karaszewski; Blanco	3:09
6.	"Harrison Ave"	Burd; Levin; Presley DeLano Regier; Aaron Shadrow; Charles Jones; Delilah Moore	Chatz; Blanco	6:01
7.	"Burst"	Burd; Levin; Samuel Jimenez	Smash David; Blanco	2:23
8.	"Second Coming"	Burd; Levin; Swift; Lex Goodwin; Magnus Høiberg; Samuel Ahana	Blanco; Cashmere Cat; Chill Pill; Lex; Swish	3:42
9.	"I Love Myself"	Burd; Levin; Harris; Thomas Lumpkins	Tommy Parker; Harris; Blanco	2:07
10.	"Kareem Abdul-Jabbar"	Burd; Levin; Nicholas Audino; Lewis Hughes; Jeremy William Fedryk	Sarcastic Sounds; Audino; Hughes; Blanco	2:27
11.	"Going Gray"	Burd; Levin; Karaszewski; Kwapis	Blanco; Karaszewski; Kwapis	3:07
12.	"I Met a Girl"	Burd; Harris	Harris; Blanco^{[a]}	1:33
13.	"YG Interlude" (featuring YG)	Burd; Levin	Blanco	1:37
14.	"No Fruits or Vegetables"	Burd; Levin	Blanco	2:25
15.	"I'm Drunk"	Burd; Levin; Høiberg; Miramontez	Blanco; Cashmere Cat; Lane	2:01
16.	"Morning After"	Burd; Harris; Carter Lang; Tom Levesque; Alex Goldblatt	Harris; Lang; Levesque; Goldblatt	3:06
17.	"My Dick Sucks"	Burd; Jamil Chammas; Ryan Vojtesak	Digi; Rob; Blanco^{[a]}	2:34
18.	"Still Freestyling" (Outro)	Burd; Kwapis; Karaszewski	Kwapis; Karaszewski; Blanco^{[a]}	3:45
19.	"Jail (Part 1)" (Bonus Track)	Burd; David Doman; Thomas Klotz	D.A. Doman; Blanco	8:44
20.	"Heresay" (Bonus Track)	Burd; Miramontez	Lane	1:41
21.	"Hi, I'm Dave" (Bonus Track)	Burd; Harris; Clarke	Harris; Clarke	1:00
22.	"We Good" (Bonus Track) (featuring GaTa))	Burd; Levin; Karaszewski; Kwapis; Davionte Ganter; William Daron Pulliam; Albert John Tanner; Eddie Jones; Isiah Drewery	Blanco; Kwapis; Karaszewski	2:49
Total length:				66:00

Note

- ^{^[a]} signifies an additional producer.

Sample credits

- "Harrison Ave", contains a sample of "Wrapped up Tight", written by Charles Jones and Delilah Moore.
- "We Good", contains elements from:
  - "Didn't I", written by William Daron Pulliam and Albert John Tanner, and performed by Darondo.
  - "The Picture Became Quite Clear", written by Eddie Jones and Isiah Drewery, and performed by The Manhattans.

=== Personnel ===
- Lil Dicky – vocals, engineering
- Nick Audino – instrumentation, programming, keyboards, and engineering (10)
- Ryan Baharloo – background vocals (3)
- Ashlyn Banner – production coordinator (1–3, 5, 7–11, 13–15, 19, 22)
- Benny Blanco – executive producer, instrumentation and programming (1–18, 20–22), keyboards (1–8, 10–18, 20–22), engineering
- Dylan Brady – instrumentation, programming, keyboards, and engineering (1)
- Cashmere Cat – instrumentation, programming, keyboards, and engineering (8)
- Chatz – instrumentation, programming, and keyboards (6)
- Chill Pill – instrumentation, programming, and keyboards (3)
- Jahnei Clarke – instrumentation, programming, and keyboards (4, 21)
- Casey Cuayo – mix engineer (22)
- D.A. Doman – instrumentation, programming, keyboards, and engineering (19)
- Lia Elizabeth Farrelly-Hodge – instrumentation, programming, and keyboards (2)
- GaTa – vocals (22)
- Alex Goldblatt – instrumentation, programming, and keyboards (16)
- Michael John Gove – mix engineer (1–18, 20)
- Jasper Harris – instrumentation, programming, and keyboards (2, 4, 9, 12, 16, 21)
- Eli Heisler – mix engineer (22)
- Lewis Hughes – instrumentation, programming, keyboards, and engineering (10)
- Jeff Huskins – Dolby Atmos mixing and mastering
- Jack Karaszewski – instrumentation, programming, and keyboards (5, 11, 18, 22); guitars (5); engineering (11)
- Rob Kinelski – mixing (19, 21, 22), mix engineer (19), engineer (21)
- Dave Kutch – mastering
- Henry Kwapis – instrumentation, programming, and keyboards (5, 11, 18, 22); guitars (5); engineering (11)
- Stan Lane – instrumentation, programming, and keyboards (2, 15, 20)
- Carter Lang – instrumentation, programming, and keyboards (16)
- Tom Levesque – instrumentation, programming, and keyboards (16)
- Lex – instrumentation, programming, and keyboards (3)
- Migui Maloles – mixing (1–18, 20)
- Tommy Parker – instrumentation, programming, and keyboards (9)
- Marko Penn – background vocals (3)
- Kevin Peterson – assistant mastering engineer
- Sarcastic Sounds – instrumentation, programming, keyboards, and engineering (10)
- Samuel Jimenez – instrumentation, programming, keyboards, and engineering (7)
- Eugene Tsai – instrumentation, programming, and keyboards (2)
- YG – intro speaking part (13)

== Reception ==
=== Critical response ===
On Metacritic, the first season has a score of 64 out of 100 based on 10 reviews. On Rotten Tomatoes, it has an approval rating of 77% with an average score of 6.7 out of 10 based on 22 reviews. The website's critical consensus is, "DAVE can be just as off-putting as Lil Dicky's rap persona with its abundance of genitalia jokes and self-aggrandizement, but beneath the raunchy veneer is a surprisingly self-aware show with a sweet core."

After mixed reviews for the first few episodes that were previewed by media outlets, the second half of the season was positively received by The Guardian, IndieWire, Financial Times, and Rolling Stone. Reviewers noted the expansion of the series' sources of humor, its dedication to character development, and improved emotional depth. At the end of its first season, Dave averaged 5.32 million viewers per episode, making it the most popular comedy in FX's history. While most of the characters and actors have been praised, the "Lil Dicky" character in the show has been negatively received. Many reviewers have noted that while the character's success is the center of the show, his poor treatment of his friends makes him difficult to root for. Additionally, the first season has been criticized for exploring and idealizing fame over art. Daniel D'Addario of Variety unfavorably compared the show to Atlanta, another entry from FX. D'Addario states "When Donald Glover made an FX show about characters trying to break into the music industry, it was 'Atlanta,' among the most expansive, richly imaginative shows of the century so far. When Lil Dicky does it, it's a show whose breaks from flatly telling us about his character's private parts tend to follow a linear trajectory: Lil Dicky, a ditherer with more zeal for fame than true creative ambition, ends up trying something, it goes viral, everyone loves it."

On Metacritic, the second season has a score of 84 out of 100 based on 11 reviews. On Rotten Tomatoes, the second season received an approval rating of 92% with an average score of 8.3 out of 10 based on 13 reviews. The website's critical consensus is, "Dave still has a lot of growing up to do, but DAVE has matured into a darkly hilarious and disarmingly wise comedy about the alienating price of fame." GaTa's performance as himself has been singled as a standout from the first two seasons.

On Metacritic, the third season has a score of 84 out of 100 based on 6 reviews. On Rotten Tomatoes, the third season received an approval rating of 100% with an average score of 8.1 out of 10 based on 10 reviews.

=== Accolades ===
Year	Award	Category	Nominee(s)	Result	Ref.
2021	Satellite Awards	Best Actor in a Series, Comedy or Musical	Dave Burd	Nominated	
2021	Writers Guild of America Awards	New Series	Dave Burd, Vanessa McGee, Saladin Patterson, Luvh Rakhe, Alex Russell, Jeff Schaffer, Max Searle, Yamara Taylor	Nominated	
2022	Writers Guild of America Awards	Episodic Comedy	Luvh Rakhe & Lee Sung Jin for "Enlightened Dave"	Nominated	
2023	Black Reel Awards for Television	Outstanding Guest Performance in a Comedy Series	Don Cheadle	Nominated	
