= K-hole =

Condition after taking ketamine

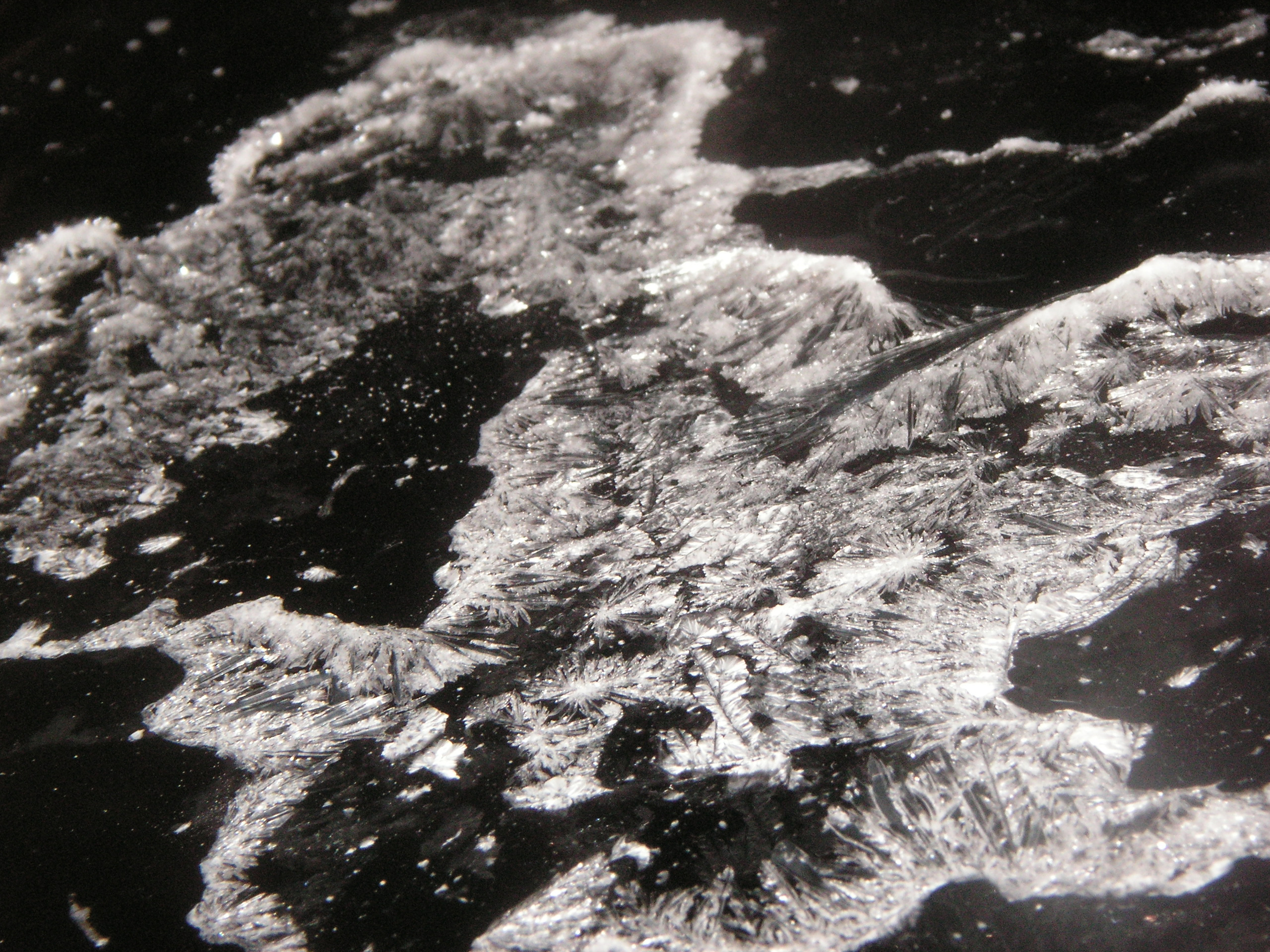
Ketamine crystals on a glass plate

A K-hole is a transient dissociative state experienced during ketamine intoxication. Often referred to as "K-holing", this state is characterized by total detachment from one's body and environment, rendering users completely immobilized. Although occasionally sought intentionally by users who consider the experience of K-holing spiritually or recreationally valuable, it is typically considered undesirable and frequently occurs due to accidental overdose. The high dosages of ketamine necessary to induce a K-hole are unsafe and carry significant physical and psychological risks associated with both acute toxicity and chronic exposure.

== Recreational usage ==
Ketamine is an NMDA receptor antagonist, developed in the 1960s to induce anesthesia in patients but recreational users have found great appeal in its antidepressant, dissociative and hallucinatory effects that are characteristic of a K-hole experience. Whereas the common recreational dose of ketamine is approximately 30–75 mg, a dose of more than 150 mg is required to enter a K-hole.

== Experiences ==
Experiencing a K-hole varies greatly for each individual. The intensity and length are influenced by the users' current mental state, previous experience and drug dosage. Ketamine induces dose-related effects that include distortion of time and space, hallucinations and mild dissociative effects. During a K-hole, users experience a high level of detachment from the environment, resulting in an inability to respond to surroundings and move their bodies functionally. During these states, perception seems to lie deep within consciousness so that the reality of the "outside" world appears to reside in the distance. A high number of recreational users report that the most appealing effects of this experience are "melting into surroundings", "visual hallucinations", "out of body experience" and "giggliness". By contrast, the least frequent and most negative effects include near-death experiences, and physical health problems, like the so-called "K-cramps" from gastric pain, bladder failure, and unappealing mental side-effects, like "memory loss". "Decreased sociability" is also reported post-K-hole.

Many individuals describe a K-hole as a fascinating life-changing experience and a spiritual journey resulting in some form of spiritual realization. They state that this experience provided clairvoyance and assisted them to get through mental disorders like depression and social anxiety. About half of the recreational users describe a K-hole as a positive experience, as it provides "a short escape from their daily problems". Even though some people seem to enjoy and actively look for a K-hole, for many it is still an unwanted side effect of an overdose of ketamine.

== Risks ==
Frequent K-hole experiences can result in episodic and semantic memory impairments. Depending on how long this state lasts, hallucinations and symptoms of psychosis can develop. A K-hole experience can produce physical risks. For instance, bladder damage can be an indication of ketamine-induced (ulcerative) interstitial cystitis.

== In popular culture ==
Scary Movie (2026 film) has a scene in which the character Shorty has a drug overdose and believes he is going into a K-hole, but it turns out to be a K-Pop hole: an animated hallucination sequence that parodies K-Pop Demon Hunters.
