= GaTa =

American actor and rapper (born 1987)

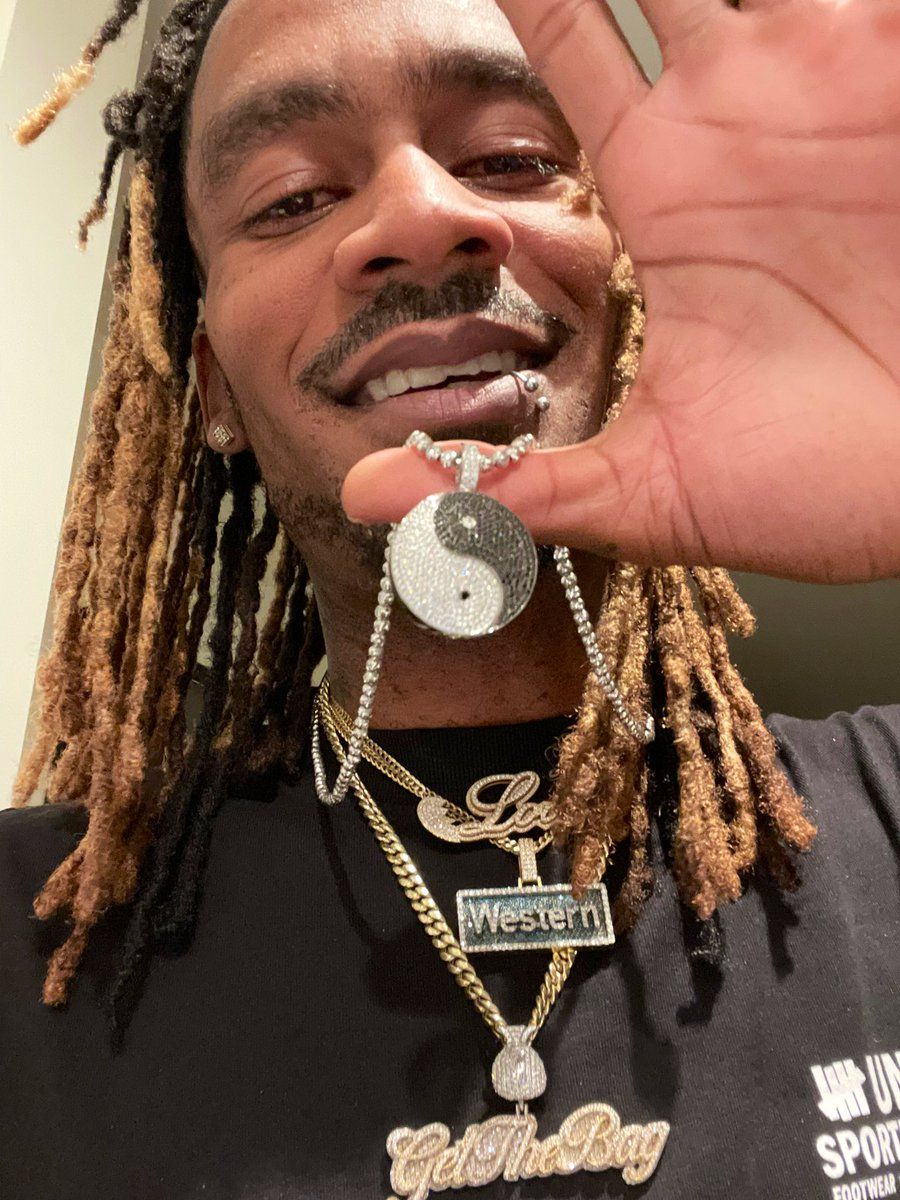
- GaTa in 2021

Background information
- Born: Davionte Ganter; June 30, 1987 (age 39); South Central Los Angeles, California, U.S.
- Occupations: Rapper; hype man; actor
- Years active: 2006–present
- Label: G.E.D Inc.
- Website: twitter.com/GaTaGED

Davionte Ganter, known professionally as GaTa, (born June 30, 1987) is an American rapper and actor. He is the hype man for rapper Lil Dicky and portrayed a fictionalized version of himself in the FXX TV series Dave.

== Early life and education ==
GaTa grew up in South Los Angeles, where he was adopted out of foster care by an aunt whom he considers his mother. He never knew his biological mother or father. Inspired by the rapper Da Brat, he began rapping while a student at Audubon Middle School.

== Career ==
=== Music ===
As a hype man, GaTa traveled the world performing with rappers including Lil Wayne and Gym Class Heroes. Tyga, GaTa, and his childhood friend Schoolboy Q formed the music label G.E.D., which GaTa says stands for "grinding every day, getting every dollar, getting educated daily."

Around 2013, GaTa began working with Lil Dicky, with whom he would later star in the comedy-drama Dave.

GaTa released the single "Check Up" in July 2021.

=== Television and film ===
GaTa began his acting career in the FXX TV series Dave, in which he plays an authentic but "heightened" version of himself. Having never acted beyond music videos or taken any acting classes, he had to audition to play the role of himself on the show. His performance has been well received, leading some critics to say he deserved an Emmy nomination.

In 2022, GaTa appeared in the stoner film Good Mourning with Machine Gun Kelly and Mod Sun. GaTa also appeared on season 1, episode 10 of Apple TV’s Loot as himself.

In 2023, GaTa played Pete in the romantic comedy film Anyone but You.

== Personal life ==
GaTa has bipolar disorder, a condition that was also given to his character on Dave.

In October 2023, GaTa was arrested and charged with felony domestic violence before being released on bond.

== Filmography ==
=== Music videos ===
Year	Title	Artist
2008	"Shawty is a Fan"	Tyga feat. GaTa
2018	"Sponsor Me"	Clue feat. GaTa
2020	"Stuck with U"	Ariana Grande and Justin Bieber
2021	"Havin' It"	GaTa

=== Television ===
Year	Title	Role	Notes
2020	Tournament of Laughs	Himself	1 episode
2020–2023	Dave	Davionte Ganter / GaTa	Main cast
2021	Fast Foodies	Himself	1 episode
2022	Loot	GaTa (Dave)	1 episode
2024	Bel-Air	Pony Rich	Episode: "Getting Personal"
2025	Poker Face	Gene	Episode: "The Sleazy Georgian"
2026	Rick and Morty	Fourth-Dimensional Prisoner	Episode: "There's Something About Morty"

=== Film ===
Year	Title	Role
2022	Good Mourning	Leo
2022	On the Come Up	M-Dot
2023	Self Reliance	Charlie
2023	Anyone but You	Pete
2023	Young. Wild. Free.	All
2023	House Party	GaTa (Dave)
2024	Sweet Dreams	Jake
TBA	Not An Artist	
