= I'm Brain =

EP by Brain
- Released: September 14, 2017
- Genre: Comedy rap
- Length: 21:35
- Label: Commission
- Producers: Lil Dicky; Thomaz Klotz; Charlie Handsome; Cubeatz; Eestbound; OZ; Digi; Blvk Amish

Brain chronology
Professional Rapper (2015)	I'm Brain (2017)	Penith (The Dave Soundtrack) (2024)

I'm Brain is the only EP from Brain, an alter ego of American rapper Lil Dicky. Released on September 14, 2017, by Commission Records, the comedy EP features Lil Dicky himself and The Game.

== Background and release ==
Brain first appeared on Lil Dicky's 2015 debut album Professional Rapper, featuring on the track "Pillow Talking". TJ Francis, in a piece for lifestyle website BroBible, wrote that the character allowed Lil Dicky to "dive deeper into his own mind and show off a different side". Mass Appeal published an interview with Brain on April 14, 2017, where he stated that he was working on a debut project. Lil Dicky teased a release from Brain on 1 September 2017, tweeting that "Brain been in the lab too" in response to a tweet asking about an upcoming album from Lil Dicky. 1 week later, Brain released a debut solo single on SoundCloud, entitled "Left Brain Right Brain". This was followed up the next day by another single featuring Lil Dicky called "Could I B Jesus". Hot New Hip Hop's Mitch Findlay praised the "banging instrumental" and Lil Dicky's "signature blend of hilarious wit and capable flow". While neither track was featured on the EP, the 7 track EP was released on September 14, 2017.

== Critical reception ==
Aron A., writing a review for HotNewHipHop, deemed this EP "another confirmation of Lil Dicky's creative brilliance".

In the Sonoma State Star, Nick Coats said of the EP that "if you are a fan of Dicky, you will appreciate his impressive flow, lyrical prowess and creative genius behind his character, Brain", presenting the opinion that while the EP is credited to Brain, the Brain persona "once again serves as comedic relief", and Lil Dicky takes the lead with what Coats calls "heavy lyricism and flows". XXL's Nick Mojica gave a similar view, writing that "although Brain is still used for comedic relief, Dicky once again flexes his lyrical prowess on the project".

== Track listing ==
Credits adapted from Tidal.

I'm Brain track listing
No.	Title	Producer(s)	Length
1.	"On Smash" (featuring Lil Dicky)	David Burd; Thomaz Klotz	3:27
2.	"Cocaine" (featuring Lil Dicky)	Charlie Handsome; Burd	4:02
3.	"Whippin' It Up" (featuring Lil Dicky)	Cubeatz; Burd; Eestbound; Ozan Yildirim	3:16
4.	"Brainstorm"	Burd; Digi	2:27
5.	"F Slo" (featuring Lil Dicky)	Burd; Digi	3:15
6.	"Interlude"	Burd	0:42
7.	"How Can U Sleep" (featuring Lil Dicky and The Game)	Blvk Amish; Burd	4:26
Total length:			21:35
