= Earth (song) =

2019 charity single by Lil Dicky

Single by Lil Dicky
- Released: April 19, 2019
- Length: 4:41
- Label: Dirty Burd; Commission; BMG
- Composers: Benny Blanco; Ammo; Cashmere Cat
- Lyricists: Benny Blanco; Lil Dicky; Jamil Chammas
- Producers: Benny Blanco; Cashmere Cat

Lil Dicky singles chronology
| "Freaky Friday" (2018) | "Earth" (2019) | "Running Over" (2020) |

Music video
- "Earth" on YouTube

"Earth" is a charity single by American rapper Lil Dicky. It was released on April 19, 2019 (three days before Earth Day) through Dirty Burd, Commission, and BMG. The song features vocals from Dicky, Justin Bieber, Ariana Grande, Halsey, Zac Brown, Brendon Urie, Hailee Steinfeld, Wiz Khalifa, Snoop Dogg, Kevin Hart, Adam Levine, Shawn Mendes, Charlie Puth, Sia, Miley Cyrus, Lil Jon, Rita Ora, Miguel, Katy Perry, Lil Yachty, Ed Sheeran, Meghan Trainor, Joel Embiid, Tory Lanez, John Legend, Psy, Bad Bunny, Kris Wu, Backstreet Boys, and a spoken part by Leonardo DiCaprio.

== Background ==
On April 9, 2019, Dicky took to Twitter to announce the release of a new song the following week. It was also reported that Canadian singer Justin Bieber would return to music as a guest feature on a new Lil Dicky song. Bieber confirmed the collaboration on Twitter a few days later. Over 30 celebrities and singer-songwriters were in the recording studio to perform the song.

== Music video ==
On April 17, Dicky released a preview of the music video that was released the following day. Co-directed by Nigel Tierney of Emmy-winning studio RYOT (the studio that made Behind the Fence VR), Federico Heller of 3Dar (the studio that made Uncanny Valley), Oddbot Animation, and Iconic Engine, the computer-animated video is told from the perspective of several animals affected by climate change, with their voices being provided by 30 celebrities and singer-songwriters.

== Reception ==
The song received mostly negative reviews from critics. In a Pitchfork review, Jeremy D. Larson panned "Earth" as a "terrible song" that "sounds less like a charity single and more like a theme to a downmarket Disney clone made explicitly to launder money for an offshore criminal enterprise". Spin magazine included the song in their list of the worst songs of 2019, calling it a qualitative step back to Dicky's 2018 single "Freaky Friday".

== Vocalists ==
List of guest vocalists with the role each plays in the song (animal character names are the stated phrase after "I'm a" at the beginning of each new line):

- Lil Dicky as Human
- Justin Bieber as Baboon
- Ariana Grande as Zebra
- Halsey as Lion Cub
- Zac Brown as Cow
- Brendon Urie as Pig
- Hailee Steinfeld as Common Fungus
- Wiz Khalifa as Disgruntled Skunk
- Snoop Dogg as Marijuana Plant
- Kevin Hart as Kanye West
- Adam Levine as Vultures
- Shawn Mendes as Rhinos
- Charlie Puth as Giraffe
- Sia as Kangaroo
- Miley Cyrus as Elephant
- Lil Jon as Clam
- Rita Ora as Wolf
- Miguel as Squirrel
- Katy Perry as Pony
- Lil Yachty as HPV
- Ed Sheeran as Koala
- Meghan Trainor as India
- Joel Embiid as Africa
- Tory Lanez as China
- John Legend as backup vocals
- Psy, Bad Bunny, and Kris Wu as secondary backup vocals (last verses only, in their respective native languages)
- Backstreet Boys as Credits (video version only)
- Leonardo DiCaprio as Himself (video version only)

== Charts ==
Weekly chart performance for "Earth"
| Chart (2019) | Peak position |
|---|---|
| Australia (ARIA) | 17 |
| Austria (Ö3 Austria Top 40) | 27 |
| Belgium (Ultratip Bubbling Under Flanders) | 1 |
| Canada Hot 100 (Billboard) | 3 |
| Czech Republic Singles Digital (ČNS IFPI) | 18 |
| Denmark (Tracklisten) | 12 |
| Germany (GfK) | 77 |
| Hungary (Stream Top 40) | 38 |
| Ireland (IRMA) | 18 |
| Japan (Japan Hot 100) | 81 |
| Lithuania (AGATA) | 57 |
| Netherlands (Dutch Tipparade 40) | 1 |
| Netherlands (Global Top 40) | 6 |
| Netherlands (Single Top 100) | 36 |
| Netherlands (Streaming Top 40) | 11 |
| New Zealand (Recorded Music NZ) | 20 |
| Norway (VG-lista) | 11 |
| Scottish Singles Sales (Official Charts) | 26 |
| Slovakia Singles Digital (ČNS IFPI) | 29 |
| Sweden (Sverigetopplistan) | 35 |
| Switzerland (Schweizer Hitparade) | 42 |
| UK Singles (Official Charts) | 21 |
| US Billboard Hot 100 | 17 |

Year-end chart rankings for "Earth"
| Chart (2019) | Position |
|---|---|
| Netherlands (Streaming Top 40) | 96 |

== Certifications ==
Certifications for "Earth"
| Region | Certification | Certified units/sales |
|---|---|---|
| Brazil (Pro-Música Brasil) | Gold | 20,000^{‡} |
| Canada (Music Canada) | Platinum | 80,000^{‡} |
| New Zealand (RMNZ) | Gold | 15,000^{‡} |
| United Kingdom (BPI) | Silver | 200,000^{‡} |
| United States (RIAA) | Platinum | 1,000,000^{‡} |
^{‡} Sales+streaming figures based on certification alone.

== See also ==
- Charity supergroup
- Earth anthem
