= Professional Rapper =

Studio album by Lil Dicky
- Released: July 31, 2015
- Genres: Hip hop; comedy hip hop
- Length: 89:00
- Labels: Commission; Dirty Burd; ADA/Elektra
- Producers: Lil Dicky (also exec.); Battleroy; Jim Cummings; Roger Goodman; Money Alwayz; Stan Lane

Lil Dicky chronology
So Hard (2013)	Professional Rapper (2015)	I'm Brain (2017)

Singles from Professional Rapper
- 1. "Lemme Freak" Released: September 17, 2014; 2. "White Crime" Released: December 10, 2014; 3. "Save Dat Money" Released: June 10, 2015; 4. "Professional Rapper" Released: July 31, 2015

Professional ratings
Review scores
Source	Rating
AllMusic	3.5/5 stars
HipHopDX	3.5/5
Vice	A−

Professional Rapper is the debut studio album by American rapper Lil Dicky. It was released on July 31, 2015, by Commission Records, Dirty Burd Music and Alternative Distribution Alliance. The album features guest appearances from Snoop Dogg, Rich Homie Quan, Fetty Wap, Jace, Viper, Brendon Urie of Panic! at the Disco, and T-Pain, alongside narrations from Hannibal Buress and Lil Dicky's parents.

The album debuted at number seven on the US Billboard 200, with first-week sales of 22,000 copies, created a total of 26,000 equivalent album units in the United States.

== Background ==
On May 22, 2013, Lil Dicky self-released his first official mixtape, titled So Hard. Following the release of the mixtape, Dicky began using the Kickstarter website, to create a goal of raising $70,000 for him to release his upcoming first studio album, with accompanying music videos and tours. On November 20, 2013, Kickstarter projected a month-long for a crowdfunding period of reaching a fundraising goal within a week. The fundraising was dramatically successful, raising it at a total of $113,017.

== Singles ==
The album's lead single, "Lemme Freak", was released on September 17, 2014. The song was produced by Jim Cummings. The music video received over 90 million views as of May 2021.

The album's second single, "White Crime", was released on December 10, 2014. The song was produced by Roger Goodman. The music video received over 21 million views as of May 2021.

The album's third single, "Save Dat Money", was released on June 10, 2015. The song features guest appearances from American rappers Fetty Wap and Rich Homie Quan, with production by Money Alwayz. The song peaked at number 71 on the US Billboard Hot 100. The music video received over 165 million views as of May 2021.

The album's title track, "Professional Rapper", was released as the album's fourth and final single on July 31, 2015. The song features a guest appearance from American rapper Snoop Dogg, with production by Stan Lane. The music video received over 207 million views as of May 2021.

=== Other songs ===
The music video for "Molly" was released on June 9, 2016. The music video features Lil Dicky as a dejected wedding guest as he watches his lost love (portrayed by Isabelle Loeb) get married. Brendon Urie of Panic! at the Disco is also featured in the music video as a wedding singer.

The music video for "Pillow Talking" was released on April 12, 2017. The music video's high use of special effects reportedly cost $700,000 to create, making it the 49th most expensive music video of all time.

== Commercial performance ==
Professional Rapper debuted at number seven on the Billboard 200, with first-week sales of 22,000 copies, created a total of 26,000 equivalent album units in the United States. The album debuted at number one consecutively on Comedy Albums, Rap Albums and Independent Albums charts.

== Track listing ==
Credits adapted from BMI.

No.	Title	Writer(s)	Producer(s)	Length
1.	"Meet the Burds (Interlude)"	David Burd		1:03
2.	"Professional Rapper" (featuring Snoop Dogg)	Burd; Davey Miramontez; Calvin Broadus, Jr.	Stan Lane	5:54
3.	"Who Knew"	Burd; Latrell James; Tedd Boyd	James; Boyd	3:32
4.	"Lemme Freak"	Burd; Teddy Pena	Jim Cummings	4:46
5.	"Lemme Freak for Real Tho (Outro)"	Burd; Roy Battle	Battleroy	4:17
6.	"White Crime"	Burd; Roger Goodman	Goodman	3:40
7.	"Molly" (featuring Brendon Urie of Panic! at the Disco)	Burd; Nicholas Warwar; Vincent Venditto; Brendon Urie; William Rybak	StreetRunner	4:04
8.	"Bruh..."	Burd; Ryan Vojtesak	Charlie Handsome	4:23
9.	"Hannibal Interlude" (featuring Hannibal Buress)	Burd; Ruben Pinto; Hannibal Buress	BlvckVmish Music	2:01
10.	"Save Dat Money" (featuring Fetty Wap and Rich Homie Quan)	Burd; Anton Matsulevich; Matthew Washington; Willie Maxwell; Dequantes Lamar	Money Alwayz	4:51
11.	"Oh Well" (featuring Jace)	Burd; Zachary Burwell; Jason Harris	Burwell	3:29
12.	"Personality" (featuring T-Pain)	Burd; Pinto; Faheem Najm	BlvckVmish Music	4:19
13.	"Pillow Talking" (featuring Brain)	Burd; Vojtesak; Jamil Chammas	Charlie Handsome; Digi	10:46
14.	"Parental Advisory (Interlude)"	Burd		1:22
15.	"Classic Male Pregame"	Burd; Battle	Battleroy	4:03
16.	"The Antagonist"	Burd; Miramontez	Stan Lane	6:03
17.	"The Antagonist II"	Burd; Deniro Elliott	Elliott	3:53
18.	"Parents Still Don't Understand (Interlude)"	Burd		1:39
19.	"Work (Paid for That?)"	Burd; Jason Pounds	Pounds	4:56
20.	"Truman"	Burd; Pounds	Pounds	10:15

== Charts and certifications ==
=== Weekly charts ===
Chart (2015)	Peak position
US Billboard 200	7
US Top R&B/Hip-Hop Albums (Billboard)	2
US Top Rap Albums (Billboard)	1
US Top Comedy Albums (Billboard)	1
US Independent Albums (Billboard)	1
Chart (2018)	Peak position
New Zealand Heatseeker Albums (RMNZ)	6

=== Year-end charts ===
Chart (2015)	Position
US Independent Albums (Billboard)	37
US Top R&B/Hip-Hop Albums (Billboard)	72

Chart (2016)	Position
US Billboard 200	176
US Top R&B/Hip-Hop Albums (Billboard)	54

=== Certifications ===
Region	Certification	Certified units/sales
United States (RIAA)	Platinum	1,000,000^{‡}
^{‡} Sales+streaming figures based on certification alone.

== See also ==
- List of Billboard number-one Rap albums of 2015
