= Freaky Friday (song) =

Single by Lil Dicky featuring Chris Brown
- Released: February 27, 2018
- Recorded: 2017
- Genre: Comedy hip-hop; pop rap
- Length: 3:36
- Label: Dirty Burd; Commission; BMG
- Songwriters: Lil Dicky; Chris Brown; Ammo; Nicholas Audino
- Producers: Benny Blanco; Twice as Nice; Mustard

Lil Dicky singles chronology
"Dirty Work" (2017)	"Freaky Friday" (2018)	"Earth" (2019)

Chris Brown singles chronology
"Stranger Things" (2018)	"Freaky Friday" (2018)	"Date Night (Same Time)" (2018)

Music video
- "Freaky Friday" on YouTube

"Freaky Friday" is a song by American rapper Lil Dicky featuring American singer Chris Brown. Written alongside Ammo and Nicholas Audino and produced by Mustard, Benny Blanco and Twice as Nice, it was released by Dirty Burd on February 27, 2018, with its music video being released the following week. The song is a comedy hip hop and pop-rap track that takes its concept from the 2003 movie Freaky Friday, being about Lil Dicky and Chris Brown swapping bodies. It also contains uncredited vocals from Ed Sheeran, DJ Khaled, and Kendall Jenner.

"Freaky Friday" became Lil Dicky's most commercially successful single, peaking at number eight on the Billboard Hot 100. Outside of the United States, "Freaky Friday" topped the charts in New Zealand and the United Kingdom, and peaked within the top ten of the charts in Australia, Belgium (Wallonia), Canada, Denmark, Ireland, and the Netherlands. The song received a mixed response from critics, who felt divided towards its content.

== Composition and background ==
"I haven’t put any music out in three years, and I really wanted to challenge myself to make something impactful. I think the video helped take it over the top, for sure. But even with the song by itself, I remember when Chris came out of the booth when we were recording it, he said, “This really sounds like a hit.” So, the thought was always in the back of my mind. But, to see it come to fruition is amazing."

— Lil Dicky talking about the making of the song in 2018.

"Freaky Friday" is a comedy hip hop song featuring a pop rap light-synthed Mustard and Benny Blanco production.

Lil Dicky stated during a 2018 interview with TheGrio that, not having released anything for three years prior to "Freaky Friday", he wanted to prove himself making "the best song [he] could've done". After coming up with the concept for the song, the rapper decided to realize it with Chris Brown. Lil Dicky stated that he chose Brown because “he's the best example of a superstar [he would have liked] to be for a day”, because of his looks, singing and dancing skills. According to Dicky, he first met Brown at a 2015 celebrity basketball game, he spoke about it during a 2023 interview with The Hollywood Reporter: “He walks right up to me, and he says, ‘Hey man, I just want you to know, you’re an incredible rapper.’ And Chris Brown was my ringtone in the ninth grade, and it was just a very meaningful thing for someone to say to me at that time”.

The rapper said that "[he] had the general idea" for the song, wanting to replicate the concept of the 2003 movie Freaky Friday in music, and then he heard Mustard's production, and chose it for the song because of it being a "Chris Brown beat over a Lil Dicky beat". He then started writing the song with different people prior to showing it to Brown: "we got it to a very rough, demo-y place, and I wanted to show Chris, and it’s hard. Like imagine hearing an unfinished demo without seeing the video? It’s like harder to understand from hearing just the song. So I got a guy who sounds a lot like Chris Brown, to sing the song so it could help him really visualize it. I remember thinking in my head, “I can’t confuse him.”"

In 2017, after having a meeting with Brown and his team in the singer's studio, where Lil Dicky explained them the concept of "Freaky Friday", playing them an initial demo of it, the singer was welcomed to complete the song. Dicky said to Billboard: "the second I started talking to [Chris Brown] about it, I could see how much he got the concept, and how funny he thought it could be. It was weird… I didn’t know what to expect when I went to his studio to talk about it all, show him the beat and play him a rough version of the hook, but he just laughed hysterically every time I wanted him to laugh. He was into it immediately, and we talked through the concept and individual ideas within the song, and then he took all of those thoughts and brought them to life in the biggest of ways, both in the song and in the video." Days prior to releasing "Freaky Friday", Dicky premiered it to rappers Drake and Kanye West, receiving a positive feedback.

=== Storyline ===
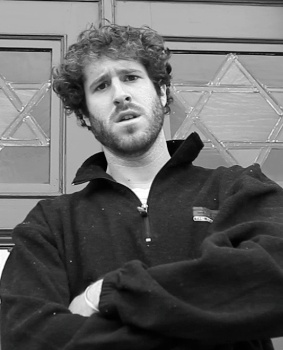
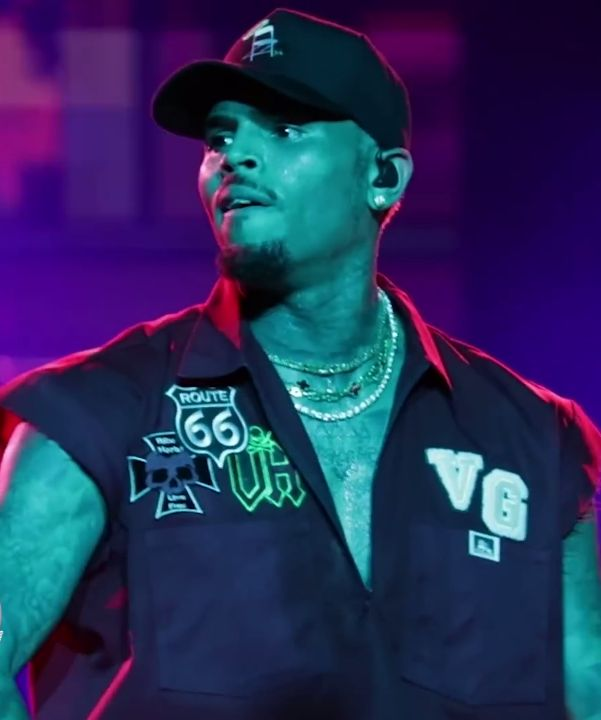
The theme of the song is Lil Dicky (left) swapping bodies with Chris Brown (right) .

In the song the artists comically take up the concept of the novel that goes by the same name, swapping their bodies, namely the one of a charismatic and controversial superstar (Chris Brown), and the one of an emerging artist with a basic life (Lil Dicky).

In the song Dicky is euphoric waking up as Brown, and rejoices because he is rich, handsome, famous, surrounded by beautiful girls and able to sing and dance. Going crazy off his euphoria, he calls Kanye West to tell him that he is his biggest fan, and then he realizes that he has a daughter. Meanwhile, Brown in Dicky's body is dissatisfied with the mediocrity of his life, but he's pleased by the fact that no one judges him in a racist way, due to him being African American, or due to his past controversies. Subsequently, Dicky in Brown's body starts to get too excited, being exalted by his sexual performances, decides to publicly post photos of his penis on the Internet, and when the real Chris Brown sees them, he starts looking desperately for him, finding him at the VIP table of a nightclub. He gets angry and threatens him, but Dicky warns him that beating him would only mean hurting himself, making him realize that he doesn't want to, because he loves himself, that being the key for both to go back into each others' bodies.

== Critical reception ==
"Freaky Friday" received a mixed response from music critics. HotNewHipHop praised the song for having "one of the funniest concept in a while", calling it "undeniably hilarious". Vibe complimented the duo's chemistry on the song, and its humor. The Michigan Daily commented that "sonically, “Freaky Friday” is extremely basic, with a thin chord progression and beat akin to last year’s hackneyed hit, “I’m the One.” The track is much more entertaining when paired with the elaborate and extended music video, the driving force behind the growing popularity of the new single." The Outline criticized it of being "racial harmony sold by two unfunny, clueless narcissists". Pitchfork called it "arguably the worst hip-hop hit of the 2010s". The Ringer wrote positively of the track: "while Lil Dicky is still fishing for the same easy laughs that he has been for years, he is now going all in on the kind of satirical rap that has earned groups like the Lonely Island, or even Weird Al Yankovic, a legitimate level of respect. Frankly, it works." Stereogum deemed the song as "humorous, catchy, and contagiously fun", saying it features a "gold-plated hook sung by Brown and impeccable if unremarkable pop-rap production". Vice commented "although comedy and punchlines are needed in rap bars, this was done in poor taste."

== Music video ==
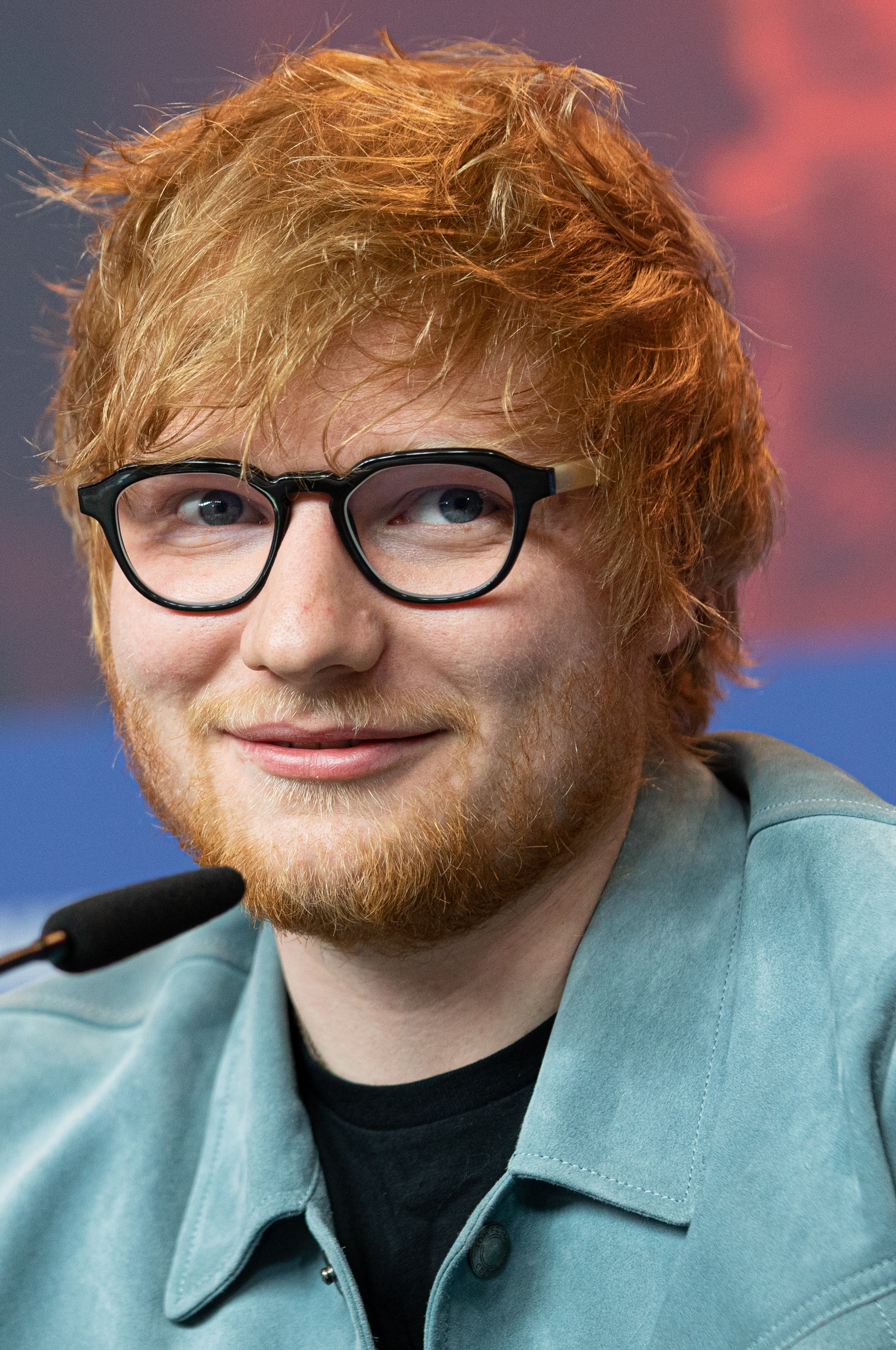
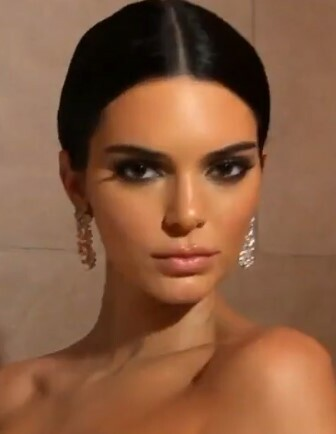
Ed Sheeran (left) and Kendall Jenner (right), make cameo appearances on "Freaky Friday"’s music video.

The music video, along with the lyrical content of the song itself, takes its concept from the 2003 movie Freaky Friday, and features cameos from Jimmy Tatro, Ed Sheeran, DJ Khaled and Kendall Jenner. The music video was shot in late 2017, and directed by Tony Yacenda. It was released on March 15, 2018, one week following the release of the song.

=== Synopsis ===
The video shows Lil Dicky at a Chinese restaurant, similar to the 2003 film, Freaky Friday, where a character is at a Chinese restaurant and wishes she was somebody else. In the music video, Lil Dicky is approached by a fan, played by Jimmy Tatro, who mentions he is a fan of his work. He then says to his girlfriend, who is standing next to him, that he is a "funny rapper", not a serious rapper. Lil Dicky then says to himself he wishes he was somebody who has credibility, and is considered to be cool. The camera then pans to Chris Brown on television, who mentions that due to the stress caused by his fame, he wishes he was somebody else as well. The Chinese waiter takes note of it, and gives Lil Dicky a fortune cookie. The video then shows Lil Dicky waking up in Chris Brown's body, and vice versa. The video illustrates the two in each other's bodies the following days, following the song's lyrical storyline. Towards the end, the two are about to fight, and they realize they shouldn't, instead they should embrace each other, being one in the other's body. This realization then sets them back to their original form. The video then ends with cameos from Ed Sheeran, DJ Khaled and Kendall Jenner, where Lil Dicky is then in possession in all of their bodies.

== Controversy ==
Shortly after the song's release, the Virginia Tech Hokies women's lacrosse team was scrutinized after members of the team uploaded a video of themselves singing along to Chris Brown's verse, where he (supposedly as Lil Dicky in his body) starts saying "What up my nigga" to everyone he encounters. Virginia Tech coach John Sung later apologized on behalf of the team, saying it was a "teachable moment" for the players and that "no malice was involved... They just thought they were just singing along to a song".

== Credits and personnel ==
Credits adapted from Tidal.

- Lil Dicky – composition, engineering
- Chris Brown – composition
- Cashmere Cat – composition
- Lewis Hughes – composition
- Wilbart McCoy III – composition
- Ammo – composition
- Mustard – composition, production
- Benny Blanco – composition, production
- Twice as Nice – composition, production
- Serban Ghenea – mix engineering
- Patrizio Pigliapoco – engineering

== Charts ==
=== Weekly charts ===
Weekly chart performance for "Freaky Friday"
Chart (2018–2019)	Peak position
Australia (ARIA)	4
Austria (Ö3 Austria Top 40)	20
Belgium (Ultratop 50 Flanders)	46
Belgium (Ultratip Bubbling Under Wallonia)	2
Canada Hot 100 (Billboard)	10
Denmark (Tracklisten)	9
France (SNEP)	113
Germany (GfK)	21
Greece (IFPI Greece)	16
Hungary (Stream Top 40)	24
Ireland (IRMA)	3
Netherlands (Single Top 100)	28
New Zealand (Recorded Music NZ)	1
Norway (VG-lista)	22
Portugal (AFP)	28
Scottish Singles Sales (Official Charts)	4
Sweden (Sverigetopplistan)	21
Switzerland (Schweizer Hitparade)	33
UK Singles (Official Charts)	1
UK Independent (Official Charts)	1
UK Hip Hop/R&B (Official Charts)	2
US Billboard Hot 100	8
US Hot R&B/Hip-Hop Songs (Billboard)	5
US R&B/Hip-Hop Airplay (Billboard)	16
US Rhythmic Airplay (Billboard)	9

=== Year-end charts ===
2018 year-end chart performance for "Freaky Friday"
Chart (2018)	Position
Australia (ARIA)	57
Canada (Canadian Hot 100)	59
Denmark (Tracklisten)	48
Ireland (IRMA)	38
New Zealand (Recorded Music NZ)	30
Portugal (AFP)	177
UK Singles (Official Charts Company)	14
US Billboard Hot 100	55
US Hot R&B/Hip-Hop Songs (Billboard)	29
US Rhythmic (Billboard)	47

== Certifications ==
Certifications and sales for "Freaky Friday"
Region	Certification	Certified units/sales
Australia (ARIA)	3× Platinum	210,000^{‡}
Brazil (Pro-Música Brasil)	2× Platinum	80,000^{‡}
Canada (Music Canada)	3× Platinum	240,000^{‡}
Denmark (IFPI Danmark)	Platinum	90,000^{‡}
Germany (BVMI)	Gold	200,000^{‡}
Netherlands (NVPI)	Platinum	80,000^{‡}
New Zealand (RMNZ)	4× Platinum	120,000^{‡}
United Kingdom (BPI)	2× Platinum	1,200,000^{‡}
United States (RIAA)	5× Platinum	5,000,000^{‡}
^{‡} Sales+streaming figures based on certification alone.

== Release history ==
Region	Date	Format	Label	Ref.
Various	February 27, 2018	Digital download	Dirty Burd	
United States	March 20, 2018	Urban contemporary radio	BMG; Commission	
