= Lil Dicky =

American rapper and comedian (born 1988)

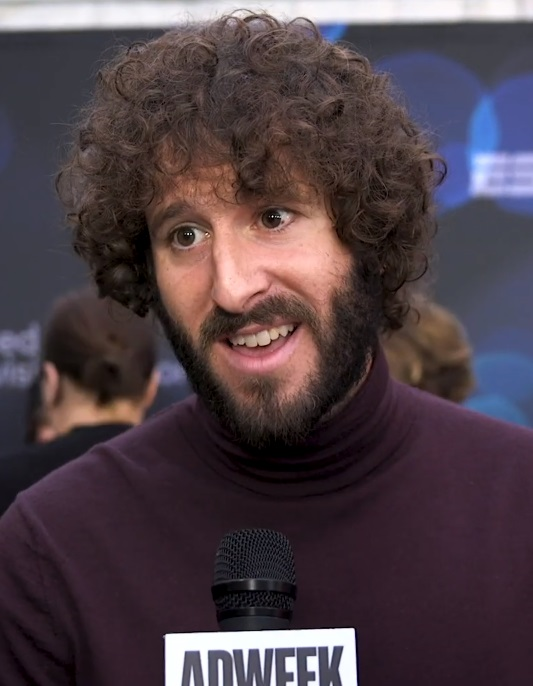
- Lil Dicky in 2019

Background information
- Also known as: Brain; LD
- Born: David Andrew Burd; March 15, 1988 (age 38); Cheltenham Township, Pennsylvania, U.S.
- Education: University of Richmond (BSBA)
- Genres: Comedy hip hop; pop
- Occupations: Rapper; singer; songwriter; comedian; actor
- Years active: 2011–present
- Labels: Dirty Burd; Commission; BMG
- Spouse: Kristin Batalucco (m. 2025)
- Website: lildicky.com

David Andrew Burd (born March 15, 1988), better known by his stage name Lil Dicky, is an American rapper, singer, songwriter, comedian, and actor. He first received recognition after the music video for his 2013 song, "Ex-Boyfriend" became a viral hit—earning over one million views on YouTube in 24 hours. His 2014 single, "Save Dat Money" (featuring Fetty Wap and Rich Homie Quan), marked his first entry on the Billboard Hot 100, received double platinum certification by the Recording Industry Association of America (RIAA), and preceded his platinum-certified debut studio album, Professional Rapper (2015).

The album, also supported by the platinum-certified single "Professional Rapper" (featuring Snoop Dogg), peaked at number seven on the Billboard 200 and saw favorable critical reception. His 2018 single, "Freaky Friday" (featuring Chris Brown) yielded his furthest success on the Billboard Hot 100, peaking at number eight. The following year, his charity record single, "Earth" peaked within the top 20 and received platinum certification by the RIAA, although critical reception was largely negative. In March 2020, Burd and producer Jeff Schaffer created Dave, a television comedy series based on Burd's life, for FXX. The show ran for three seasons and was met with positive reviews.

== Early life ==
Burd was born in Cheltenham Township on the north border of Philadelphia and grew up in an upper-middle-class Jewish family in the Elkins Park neighborhood. He was born with "a tangled urethra" and hypospadias, in which the urethra does not open from its usual location in the head of the penis, which required multiple surgeries.

Burd's interest in music started when he was a child, listening to hip hop and alternative rock. He began rapping in the fifth grade after doing a history report on Alexander Pushkin using rap music. In his youth, the rappers Burd listened to most were Nas and Jay-Z.

Burd attended Cheltenham High School. Speaking about his time in high school, Burd said "I was a pussy. I was really awkward looking. I wasn't getting any girls at all, but I was very class-clownish and I got good grades." After graduating from high school, Burd began attending the University of Richmond, where fellow 2016 XXL Freshman and rapper Dave East also attended at the same time. Burd graduated summa cum laude in 2010.

After college, Burd relocated to San Francisco, California where he worked in account management at the advertising agency Goodby, Silverstein & Partners. After reimagining his monthly progress report as a rap video, the company brought him to work in their creative department, where he wrote copy for ads such as the NBA's "BIG" campaign.

In an encounter later profiled in 2025, Burd laid tefillin, recited the associated blessings and said the Shema with Chabad activist Yossi Farro.

== Career ==
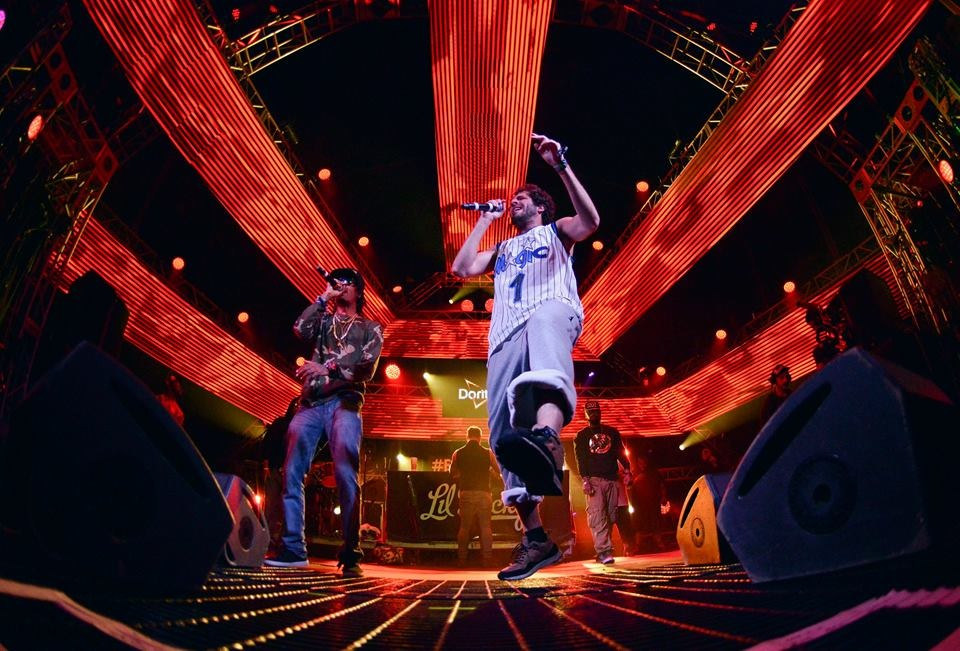
Lil Dicky performing at SXSW 2014

Burd says he initiated his rap career "simply to get attention comedically, so [he] could write movies, write TV shows and act". However, he "fell in love with rapping" and says he's "not leaving that game until [he's] proved [his] point".

Burd began working on his debut mixtape, So Hard, in 2011. The mixtape took Burd over two years to finish because he still had his day job at Goodby, Silverstein & Partners during its development. Burd recorded a majority of his early material for So Hard on his MacBook Pro and a $400 microphone; in 2013 he began releasing one song per week for five months straight. On April 23, 2013, Burd released the music video for his song "Ex-Boyfriend", the mixtape's leading single. The music video received one million views within 24 hours of being posted on YouTube. Burd then began releasing new songs and music videos in a series titled Hump Days. Following the release of 32 songs and 15 music videos, Burd launched a Kickstarter, stating, "I've officially run out of money... In a nutshell, you are funding phase two of my rap career." The month-long crowdfunding period began on November 20, 2013, with the goal of raising $70,000 in order to enable Burd to create and produce more music, music videos, and go touring. The Kickstarter well exceeded its target, raising $113,000.

Burd held his first live concert at TLA in Philadelphia on February 19, 2014. Burd signed with CMSN for management that same year. He planned on "having two concurrent careers going on, as a rapper, and as a comedian/actor/writer". Burd released his debut album Professional Rapper on July 31, 2015, and features artists Snoop Dogg, T-Pain, Rich Homie Quan, Fetty Wap, Brendon Urie (Panic! at the Disco), RetroJace and Hannibal Buress. Burd appeared in a 2016 Funny or Die video "Watch Yo Self" with Mystikal and Trinidad James. On June 13, 2016, XXL Magazine released the 2016 Freshmen line-up. It included Burd, along with Anderson .Paak, Kodak Black, Lil Uzi Vert, 21 Savage, Dave East, Denzel Curry, Desiigner, G Herbo, and Lil Yachty.

Burd has been supportive of Israel. In 2017, Burd traveled to Israel for the first time and played two sold out shows in Tel Aviv. Also in 2017, Burd performed at the ReKood Music Fest in Los Angeles put on by the Friends of the Israel Defense Forces. The event raised over $250,000 for the Israel Defense Forces (IDF).

On April 12, 2017, Burd released a music video for "Pillow Talking". Its special effects made it the 49th most expensive music video ever created. In an interview with XXL in April 2017, Burd mentioned that he was creating a new project and that he was also attempting to pitch a TV show to networks. In September 2017, Burd released an EP under his alter ego Brain, I'm Brain. On March 15, 2018, Burd released a new single, "Freaky Friday", featuring Chris Brown, and the associated music video. By April 9, 2018, the video had reached over 100 million views and topped the charts in New Zealand and the United Kingdom. On April 2, 2018, Burd announced his first Australian tour; he previously studied abroad for two years in Melbourne.

On April 19, 2019, Burd released a single called "Earth", featuring artists such as Ariana Grande, Justin Bieber, Ed Sheeran, and Shawn Mendes. They all voice various animated organisms in the music video. The music video, which was created in partnership with the Leonardo DiCaprio Foundation, aimed at encouraging better environmental practices worldwide. Upon release Burd referred to the project as "the most important thing [he'll] ever do." The song received mostly negative reviews from critics. In a Pitchfork review, Jeremy D. Larson panned "Earth" as a "terrible song" that "sounds less like a charity single and more like a theme to a downmarket Disney clone made explicitly to launder money for an offshore criminal enterprise". Spin magazine included the song in their list of the worst songs of 2019, calling it a qualitative step back to Dicky's 2018 single "Freaky Friday".

Burd and Jeff Schaffer created a TV series called Dave, which portrays a fictionalized version of Burd's life as a rapper. It stars Burd, Taylor Misiak, GaTa, Andrew Santino, Travis Bennett and Christine Ko. The show premiered on March 4, 2020, on FXX. On May 11, 2020, Dave was renewed for a second season, which aired in 2021. On June 20, 2023, Burd announced the upcoming release of a soundtrack album for Dave following its third and final season. The soundtrack album Penith was released in January 2024.

In 2026, Burd launched a podcast with his wife, Kristin Batalucco, and the producer Benny Blanco.

== Musical style and influences ==
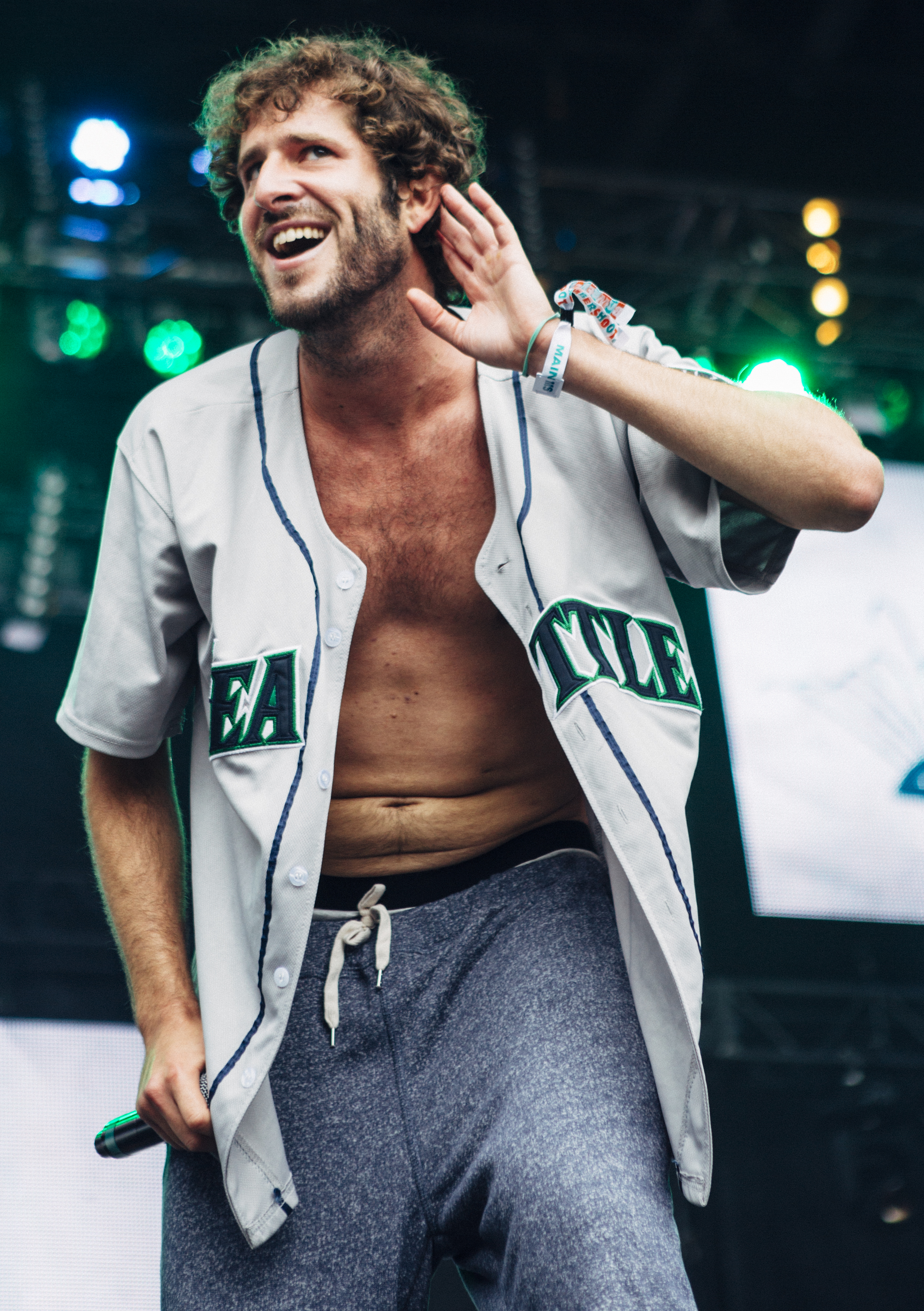
Lil Dicky in 2015

Burd's style blends the comical with the relatable. According to Boston magazine, "Content-wise, Burd comes up with his material from everyday occurrences and everyday experiences. From there, he crafts his videos around those topics to create a visual narrative that accompanies his talent as an emcee. 'It's like a comedian. They are out in the world, and writing things down,' he said. What followed 'Ex-Boyfriend' was a series of other videos that covered similarly average everyday experiences—songs about staying in for the night, songs about being a Jewish kid—he also has a rap battle with Adolf Hitler in one of his videos."

Burd describes his style as a response to the excessive egotistical nature of rap today: "I really wanted to embody the exact opposite of that, and I think people are appreciating it. There just hasn't been a voice for that normal dude when it comes to rap." He added, "I think a lot of rap is just escalated to a place that many people can't relate to... My niche is that I'm relatable. I don't rap about going to the club and popping bottles." In terms of his rapping skills, Burd is able "to manipulate words at an excessive speed, and weave rhyme patterns together in a way that's funny while also making viewers want to rewind parts of his videos".

Burd says his musical inspirations are The Lonely Island, J. Cole, A$AP Rocky, Snoop Dogg, as well as Childish Gambino.

== Discography ==
- Professional Rapper (2015)
- Penith (The Dave Soundtrack) (2024)

== Filmography ==
Year	Title	Role	Notes
2020–2023	Dave	Dave Burd/Lil Dicky	Also creator, writer, and executive producer; credited as Dave Burd

== Tours ==
Year	Tour Name
2014	Professional Rapper Tour
2015	Looking for Love Tour
2016	(Still) Looking For Love Tour
2016	Dick or Treat Tour
2018	Australia and New Zealand Tour
2018	Life Lessons Tour

== Awards and nominations ==
=== Berlin Music Video Awards ===
The Berlin Music Video Awards is an international festival that promotes the art of music videos.

Year	Nominated work	Award	Result	Ref.
2025	"HAHAHA"	Best Director	Nominated	
