= List of Royal Crackers episodes =

Royal Crackers is an American adult animated sitcom created by Jason Ruiz and developed by Ruiz and Seth Cohen for Cartoon Network's Adult Swim programming block. The series stars Ruiz, Andrew Santino, Jessica St. Clair, Maile Flanagan, and David Gborie. The series premiered on April 2, 2023.

== Series overview ==
| Season | Episodes | Originally released | |
| Season | Episodes | First released | Last released |
|---|---|---|---|
| 1 | 10 | April 2, 2023 | May 21, 2023 |
| 2 | 10 | February 29, 2024 | May 2, 2024 |

== Episodes ==
=== Season 1 (2023) ===
| No. overall | No. in season | Title | Directed by | Written by | Original release date | US viewers (millions) |
|---|---|---|---|---|---|---|
| 1 | 1 | "Crumbling Empire / Pilot" | Frederic Cristy | Jason Ruiz | April 2, 2023 (Note: First episode was released on YouTube on March 19, 2023) | 0.23 |
In Bakersfield, California, Royal Crackers Incorporated is a once-popular snack factory established by its current CEO Theodore Hornsby Sr. As he ages, Theodore becomes increasingly senile. Eventually, he is involved in an accident where he rolls down the stairs in his wheelchair. Theodore is hospitalized and enters a coma from which he is unlikely to awaken. Theodore's son, Theo Jr., initiates a viral marketing campaign that involves eating an entire box of Royal Crackers crackers in under 10 seconds.The next day, Theodore's condition becomes public knowledge. As Theo's challenge spreads, influencers Ninja, Joe Rogan, and Dwayne Johnson are killed after choking during the challenge. As Theodore's condition worsens, Darby speaks to him about how the board is going to have to elect Stebe or Theo to the position of CEO. Theodore's life support system beeps as Darby sees that Theodore has emerged from his coma. Stebe states that Royal Crackers Incorporated will right the wrongs done in the last three days. Cast : Stephanie Sheh as Rachel, Fred Tatasciore as Al, Debra Wilson as Clair Bailey Note: A portion of this episode was played during Adult Swim's April Fools programming schedule on March 31, 2023 and was also streamed on YouTube.
| 2 | 2 | "Theo's Comeback Tour" | Frederic Cristy | Marc M. & David Doré | April 2, 2023 | 0.16 |
Theo lands a gig at Kenny's Lobster Shack via manager Moey D. During Theo's performance, Moey D abruptly ends the act and brings out Bill Peachknee and his ventriloquist dummy Flappy, who insults Theo's performance. On the road, Theo rants about being bumped in favor of Bill Peachknee as Theo accidentally runs over Peachknee. Theo and his nephew Matt meet the Fixer to dispose of Peachknee's body. The two are apprehended, but manage to escape and hijack the tow truck carrying the car that Matt and Flappy are in. The Fixer drives the tow truck containing Flappy, telling Theo to keep doing himself as they will come around. Theo and Matt tearfully walk away. Cast : Gilbert Gottfried as The Fixer, Jamar Malachi Neighbors as Moey D, Fred Tatasciore as Mr. Lynx, Officer Troy, and Police Officer, Debra Wilson as Antiques Appraisals Audio Note: The episode is dedicated to the memory of guest star Gilbert Gottfried, who died prior to the episode's release.
| 3 | 3 | "Factory 37" | Frederic Cristy | Bryan Wysol | April 3, 2023 | 0.11 |
A health inspector is going to be doing an inspection on the Royal Crackers factory. Deb, Theo, Darby, Al, and Rachel assume that it is their usual health inspector Reggie, only for the inspector to be Reggie's no-nonsense brother Brent. While Stebe leads Deb and Matt in going to the abandoned Factory 37, which produces chicken-flavored crackers, the others work to take Brent on a night on the town to win him over. As Stebe gets on a ride there where he gets a tour from an animatrionic version of Theodore Hornsby Sr., Deb finds that the workers there are dead as Matt finds footage of the lead developer mentioning about using a pink goo on the chickens which went horribly wrong. Stebe, Deb, and Matt are attacked by mutated chickens and brought to their leader, who plans to mutate them with the goo. In the nick of time, Stebe, Darby, Al, and Rachel arrive and a big fight occurs. Brent arrives and reveals that Chicken Master is a mutated Reggie which explains why Reggie disappeared. As Brent plans to join his brother, Chicken Master agrees with Stebe to continue producing chicken-flavored crackers. The Hornsbys, Darby, Al, and Rachel then take their leave from Factory 37. Cast : Fred Armisen as Brent, Stephanie Sheh as Rachel, Fred Tatasciore as Al and Chicken Master/Reggie
| 4 | 4 | "Stebe" | Frederic Cristy | Jason Ruiz | April 9, 2023 | 0.17 |
Many moons ago at Silveria Hospital, a nurse asks Theodore Hornsby if he would like to hold his baby boy. He reluctantly agrees and then sees that the baby has anorchia. As he orders the nurse to give it to his mother to hold, he eats horse radishes as the nurse states that he will need to fill out the birth certificate. Theodore's wife suggests that they name the baby after him. He declines and tells the nurse to name him "Steve", but the nurse heard "Stebe" because Theodore was eating horse radishes at the same time. Theodore agrees with the name as it will serve as a reminder to him that he cannot be bothered with the boring task of naming a "ball-less boy". In the present, the Hornsby residence is visited by Lars, Theo's former bandmate in TainT. Lars meets Deb who mentions how she is on the board of directors at Royal Crackers Incorporated and is in charge of the Hornsby family's social media accounts including their increasingly popular FamGram. Deb later reads negative comments about an edited picture of Matt and one person's comment about the Hornsby family not being real. Infuriated with this, Deb works on making a picture of the Hornsby family in their swimming pool. Understanding Deb's plight of wanting Stebe to contribute to FamGram for once, Lars tells Deb that she deserves a real husband while mentioning that he would like a family of his own. As Deb embraces Lars, it is witnessed by Stebe. Later that night, Deb snaps and tells Stebe to sleep in the yard for the night. The next day, Stebe introduces the Taint reunion show as Deb finds Lars in the photo of different families on FamGram. She informs Stebe about it and how Lars siphons familial love before moving on to the next family. Stebe exposes Lars' plethora of families to Theo as the crowd demands that Stebe gets off the stage. Stebe manages to out-gibberish sing Lars enough to reduce him to dust. Cast : Gareth Reynolds as Lars, Stephanie Sheh as Rachel, Fred Tatasciore as Al and Strawbucks Manager
| 5 | 5 | "Business Mom" | Frederic Cristy | Brittany Hobbs | April 16, 2023 | 0.18 |
At Gelman's grocery store, Deb runs into Mel Dennison and finds that some Royal Crackers boxes have been blocked by a display and that there is a section of products from Dennison Snacks. Deb gets caught trying to alter the display to put the Royal Crackers products in front and is arrested. As Deb is being arrested by the police, her ranting about Dennison Snacks and shouting for people to buy Royal Crackers is recorded by a bystander. The next day at Royal Crackers Incorporated, Deb claims that Dennison Snacks will wipe Royal Crackers off the face of the Earth. Later on, Deb learns that Matt has been secretly gathering with the Dennison family. After finding Deb under a broken fan blade, Matt learns of the secret meetings. Matt is adopted into the Dennison family, but finds that things have gotten worse at the Dennison house as Rob and Mel start to get obsessed with him. Deb infiltrates the Dennison house and fights her way passed the Dennison children and Rob. After getting Rob's key card, Deb and Matt escape into the tunnels and encounter Mel. Stebe's attempt to fix Rob's satellite ends up sending a lifting vehicle into the swimming pool enough to flood the tunnels enabling Deb and Matt to escape. Cast : Andy Daly as Rob Dennison, Lennon Parham as Mel Dennison, Stephanie Sheh as Rachel, Fred Tatasciore as Al and President of Adoption, Debra Wilson as Beverly Donovan
| 6 | 6 | "Mayworth" | Frederic Cristy | Evan Mann & Gareth Reynolds | April 23, 2023 | 0.19 |
As the Hornsby family and Darby celebrate Theodore Hornsby Sr.'s birthday party despite some setbacks, Theodore Hornsby Sr. flashes back to the day when he and his former partner Luther Dennison had a falling out which led to Luther forming Dennison Snacks. Theodore reads a letter from a man named Mayworth, who worked on his first wheat farm, asking for his help. He ends up going out to help them when confronted by the ghost of a boy who died after eating Royal Crackers. During his travels, Theodore ends up in Graymarsh Swamp and stays at the house of the Bartleby family consisting of Mr. Bartleby, Mrs. Bartleby, their two sons (who resemble country versions of Stebe and Theo), and their daughter. Marjorie develops a crush on him and Theodore discovers that they are cannibals. After escaping with help from the ghost boy, Theodore makes it to the Mayworth homestead as the Marjorie talks the rest out of harming Theodore and the family inside. When he enters the house, he finds skeletons of the family. The ghost boy reveals that he is actually the Mayworth's daughter, having only brought Theodore there to witness the result of his greed before vanishing. Distraught, Theodore leaves the house and spitefully declares he was wrong to ever doubt his greedy ways. Back in the present, Rob and Mel Dennison bring an elderly and paraplegic Luther to the Hornsby's house. When alone with Theodore, Luther types on his speech-generating device that his wealth gave him no closure over their falling out. While having a realization at his Caymans villa, Luther states that their rivalry consumed them and that he still considers him a friend who he missed while wishing him a happy birthday. Theodore briefly snaps out of his sleep state and strangles Luther to death as he tries to call for Rob. The episode ends with a shot of the two elderly men on the ground as two pictures on the walls come into view: one of Theodore on his wheat farm and the other of Theodore and Marjorie, now Theodore's wife, with a young Stebe and Theo. Cast : Andy Daly as Rob Dennison and Young Luther Dennison, Lennon Parham as Mel Dennison, Stephanie Sheh as Ghost Boy, Fred Tatasciore as Mr. Bartleby and Speech-Generating Device
| 7 | 7 | "The .1%" | Frederic Cristy | Evan Mann & Gareth Reynolds | April 30, 2023 | 0.19 |
The Hornsbys are invited on a cruise by known billionaire George Zeebos as the struggle to fit in where anyone who does not live up to his expertise gets thrown overboard and eaten by sharks. Matt befriends George's robotic servant Tonya and develops a crush on her. After things go horribly awry, George sees that they do not have the same level of wealth as he does and plans to have them thrown to the sharks. Tonya helps the Hornsbys get away from the crowd. George sprouts mechanical tentacles and attacks the Hornsbys only for Tonya to sacrifice herself to destroy the ship and by the Hornsbys time to get off the shop. Back on shore, everyone heads home as Matt is mocked by his parents and Theo for dating a robot. Tonya's body sinks to the bottom of the ocean. In the post-credits, George washes ashore somewhere as his tentacles inject him with a serum that heals him as he plans his revenge on the Hornsbys. Cast : George Basil as George Zeebos, Gareth Reynolds as Clark, Debra Wilson as Tonya
| 8 | 8 | "Casa de Darby" | Frederic Cristy | Jason Ruiz | May 7, 2023 | 0.26 |
In 1846, a Mexican archaeological group led by Pablo and overseen by the Mexican army uncovers a golden chalice. The Mexican general's daughter Raven grabs it and loses her hands. As the traps are set off, the chalice transports Raven out of the cave as everyone else perishes. In the present, Stebe has procured the box of Royal Crackers to appear on a Latin-American sitcom called "Casa De Papa". As Stebe, Deb, and Theo head to Burbank, California, Darby watches over Theodore as he procured the Saturn car where they expected the vehicle that was red '96 Dodge Viper of the prizes for McDonald's Monopoly. Once Stebe, Deb, and Theo are on the set of "Casa De Papa", they watch the show in action where the character Tio Pepe eats the box of Royal Crackers and suffers a diarrhea side-effect that ends up Tio Pepe much to the dismay of Stebe. Back at home, two criminals known as the Joey and Danny who are members of the Earl Grey Bandits plan to raid the house to get the chalice that fell into Theo's possession. Darby works to defend Theo and the household Home Alone style which does not go well. He and Theodore are taken captive by the Earl Grey Bandits as their client known as the Traveler (who is actually Raven who now sports cybernetic hands) arrives and tortures Darby on where the location of the chalice is. He tells them that it is in the dishwasher and Joey does the "tea bagging" to Theodore that explains why they are called the Earl Grey Bandits. As the Traveler gets the chalice, Darby breaks free and pursues the Traveler and the Earl Grey Bandits. Darby gets the chalice back with the Traveler and the Earl Grey Bandits dying in the process. The chalice transports Darby to the past where he goes to McDonald's and takes part in the McDonalds' Monopoly. Afterwards, Darby returns to the present just as Stebe, Deb, and Theo return home and find the '96 Dodge Viper in the garage. As everyone enters the house, Theo is heard asking Darby if he washed his chalice. Cast : Carlos Alazraqui as Tio Pepe, Pablo, and Juan-Carlos Pozole, Felipe Esparza as Mexican Officer, Carolina Ravassa as The Traveler/Raven, Stephanie Sheh as Rachel, Stephanie Sigman as Abuelita, Fred Tatasciore as Al and Joey
| 9 | 9 | "CrackerCon" | Frederic Cristy | Evan Mann & Gareth Reynolds | May 14, 2023 | 0.15 |
In light of the upcoming CrackerCon, Stebe shows off his new mascot for Royal Crackers to Deb called Captain Cracker as Deb gets aroused by the design of the costume. When Stebe tries to pitch it at the meeting, Theo overshadows him by pitching a cracker cannon which everyone but Stebe approves of. When at CrackerCon, the Hornsbys find that the Dennisons are in attendance. After a neglected Stebe leaves CrackerCon, Deb and Matt maintain the Royal Crackers Booth as Theo leads Darby, Rachel, and Al into finding a former stripper associate of his named Hazelnut to help with his presentation. Outside, Stebe gives some food to a canary and ends up fighting a seagull]that stole it. Rob Dennison learns of the cracker cannon and secretly steals it which he denies upon being confronted by Deb. After some setbacks at the strip club and the location of Hazelnut's parents, Theo finds her only to discover that Hazelnut has a family of her own. A saddened Theo gives his presentation which does not go well. Rob then does his demonstration with the stolen cracker cannon by loading food from Dennison Snacks into it in order to combat an animatronic dinosaur head called Snackersaurus. Due to a malfunction backstage upon a crew member accidentally spilling his drink on the controls when ordered to turn down the fire-breathing level, Snackersaurus goes berserk and starts burning everything and everyone causing the Dennisons to flee. In the nick of time, Stebe appears in his Captain Cracker outfit as its fireproof traits help him protect his family and the surviving attendees followed by Captain Cracker using the Cracker Cannon at full power to destroy Snackersaurus. As Stebe and Deb make out, Hazelnut arrives stating to Theo that she left her other life as they make out. Darby is approached by the stripper that briefly touched him and they make out as Rachel and Al are shown giving positive reaction towards the make outs. Cast : Andy Daly as Rob Dennison, Lennon Parham as Hazelnut and Mel Dennison, Stephanie Sheh as Rachel, Fred Tatasciore as Al
| 10 | 10 | "Craftopia" | Frederic Cristy | Jason Ruiz, Evan Mann & Gareth Reynolds | May 21, 2023 | 0.19 |
Matt gives a report about his passion for the video game Craftopia as a school project as his teacher Mr. P, the internet prankster Zane, and his classmates laugh at him. When Matt's computer is destroyed by Zane who claimed to the Feds that Matt's room was the hiding place of Muammar Gaddafi, he takes a job at Royal Crackers to save enough money to buy a replacement as Stebe will not procure him a replacement. He is placed in the tasting department. Al receives a call from the corporate level and is told to bring Matt up there. Upon arrival, Matt finds that the corporate level is run by an A.I. version of Theodore Hornsby Sr. where its controls are run through a Linksys modem after having his mind mapped out many moons ago. It claims to Matt that he would be a worthy successor to the real Theodore Hornsby Sr. than Stebe and Theo. Although the Theodore Hornsby Sr. A.I. helps Matt by blackmailing Mr. P into doing a prank on Zane by claiming that his parents died in a car accident, he wants Matt to abandon Craftopia by wrecking what he has worked on building there and straining his relationship with fellow player Donutfart69. Al finds out that there is a surgical scar in the head of one of the tasting department workers as the Theodore Hornsby Sr. A.I. plans to have a surgeon place a chip in Matt so that he can live on in him like what he did to the tasting department members. Al thwarts the Theodore Hornsby Sr. A.I.'s plans by doing the same Muammar Gaddafi prank that Zane did on Matt as feds raid Royal Crackers shooting up everything, killing the surgeon, and destroying the Linksys modem enough to remove the control that the Theodore Hornsby Sr. A.I. has. Upon returning home, Matt finds a package that is implied to have been purchased by the real Theodore Hornsby Sr. It is a computer which Matt sets up in his room. He enters Craftopia, rebuilds everything there, moves his bed into the range of his computer, and lies on it until a ding is heard as something appears on the monitor. Cast : Andy Daly as SWAT Member #3, Stephanie Sheh as Rachel, Fred Tatasciore as Al, Oliver Tree as Zane

=== Season 2 (2024) ===
| No. overall | No. in season | Title | Directed by | Written by | Original release date | US viewers (millions) |
|---|---|---|---|---|---|---|
| 11 | 1 | "Fight for J. Davis High" | Frederic Cristy | Marc M. & David Doré | February 29, 2024 | 0.17 |
At Royal Crackers, Stebe, Theo, Deb, Darby, Al, and Rachel get word that Royal Crackers will not be sold at J. Davis High. This is because Mel Dennison has become a member of the school board and Head of School Lunches where she had Dennison Kale Chips be sold instead. Stebe, Theo, and Deb hold Matt accountable for not telling them of this beforehand. After Stebe and Deb attend a party held by the Dennisons who are claiming that they are "burying the hatchet" with the Hornsbys, Theo poses as a student in an attempt to cause a student uprising and ends up instigating a challenge from Matt to Rob and Mel's oldest son Sebastian. At Darby's suggestion, Stebe and Theo enlist STN new show host Smarv Tarvis to drum up some support for Royal Crackers. This causes the people of Bakersfield to take sides with some of them siding with Royal Crackers and some of them siding with Dennison Snacks as Clair Bailey interviews the Dennisons about it. Matt gets some motivation from local tough girl Holly about the upcoming showdown with Sebastian at Sylveria Park. During the showdown in Sylveria Park, Matt and Sebastian "put their differences aside" to prevent a murder from happening. After the insult from Sebastian, Matt fights Sebastian and lifts him over his head. After seeing the mixed reactions from his parents, Rob and Mel, and Holly, Matt throws Sebastian to the ground enough to shatter him. Then a mass fight between the supporters of Royal Crackers and the supporters of Dennison Snacks breaks out. Cast : Andy Daly as Rob Dennison, Kyle Dunnigan as Sebastian Dennison, Lennon Parham as Mel Dennison, Stephanie Sheh as Rachel and Holly, Fred Tatasciore as Al, Debra Wilson as Clair Bailey
| 12 | 2 | "Catalina" | Frederic Cristy | Jason Ruiz | March 7, 2024 | 0.20 |
In a flashback, Theodore Hornsby Sr. reacts to the people that Al had brought in to taste the crackers by reacting to their criticism where he accidentally cut his hand on the two-way mirror that he broke and later collapses on his way out. After some recurring nightmares involving a dog-like monster, Stebe plans to make the monster into a mascot named Mr. McCracky. The board of directors make a negative look-themed vote to have Theodore removed as CEO of Royal Crackers Incorporated. Despite this, Theodore takes Al on a flight to Catalina Island as Al hides the papers that the board of directors gave him offering him to be the new CEO. The airplane is shot down and Theodore and Al fall out of the airplane. In the present, Stebe jumps out of the window to avoid the mascot employee's payment request combined with the nightmare. Theo picks up Stebe and they drive off explaining that he had traced the Mr. McCracky stuffed toy that he claimed from Chucklebee's crane machine a few years back to a location that might hold the answers to them. Back in the past, Theodore and Al survive the fall as they find the pilot getting dragged off by a group of cat-like natives where the pilot is chained to a rock and killed by a strange dog-like beast. They barely avoid them and their dog-like beast that Theodore claims is a "chupacabra" in order to get to the airplane. While hiding in a cave and having found out that the board of directors wanting Al to succeed him, Theodore takes an egg that he found. When they make it to the airplane, Theodore ends up flying it into the "chupacabra" and the dead pilot. Taking the egg out of the airplane, he holds it up as the egg hatches into a baby "chupacabra". Back in the present, Stebe and Theo arrive at the entrance of the sealed off Hornsby Bridge and find the abandoned Hornsbyland and some skeletons. In another flashback, the board of directors praise Theodore's positive action and the construction of Hornsbyland as they enter the elevator. Unfortunately, Theodore had the elevator drop them off on a floor where he has another "chupacabra". Then he advises Al to take his leave as Al enters the same bloody elevator claiming that he has nothing personal about the board wanting to make Al succeed him. Cast : Eric Bauza as Paul, Lennon Parham as Old Board Member #2, Stephanie Sheh as Rachel, Fred Tatasciore as Al
| 13 | 3 | "MyCycle" | Frederic Cristy | Brittany Hobbs | March 14, 2024 | 0.16 |
Deb and Stebe's love making has been decreased with Stebe having midnight snacks. To appease herself, she gets herself a MyCycle as a handyman named Deshaun does housework around the house. During her session on the MyCycle, she meets a MyCycle instructor named Keith who invites her to his MyCycle retreat. Meanwhile, Theo gets a Z-Pad and plays some of Taint's NuMetal Christmas songs to Theodore. This briefly awakens Theodore, who breaks the Z-Pad before going back into his sleep state. An infuriated Theo goes to the Z-Pad's manufacturing plant to get it fixed. The plant is revealed to be owned by George Zeebos who is now a cyborg as his systems analyze that Theo is having daddy issues right now. Taking advantage of it, George approaches Theo offering to be his new father. Deb is at the retreat and partakes in the event. She is rescued by the real Keith when his robot double makes the other girls pedal to their death so that their energies can be harnessed and converted into zEnergy. They soon discover some previous dead female bodies as they discover that it is a front for George Zeebos as they avoid his robots. After a pep talk from Deshaun, Stebe plans to prove his love to Deb. Keith states to Deb that she needs to destroy the zEnergy conduit. When Deb finds the controls to George's device, George has Theo attack Deb as Keith gets wounded in the process. Theo agrees to help Deb. Theo and Deb throw the zEnergy conduit overboard as George jumps after it while losing some of his fake skin and cybernetic parts in the fall. Moments later, the police and the EMTs arrive at the plant where Keith is placed on a stretcher. Stebe arrives to profess his love to Deb while showing that he had burned his penis on a dripped pizza pocket. When Keith asks who Stebe is, Deb states that Stebe is her husband. In the post-credits, a reboot in the plant happens which also brings George back online as he laughs maniacally. Cast : George Basil as George Zeebos, Ken Marino as Keith, Clarke Peters as Deshaun, Debra Wilson as Jill
| 14 | 4 | "Bro Down" | Frederic Cristy | Jason Ruiz | March 21, 2024 | 0.15 |
After using a dating services for convicts called Intimate Inmate, Darby begins dating a recently-paroled felon named Doris. As the two date, Theo begins to feel neglected by Darby who is also his anti-jackhang sponsor, causing Theo to relapse after a visit to Jack Hangers Anonymous. Things get complicated between Darby and Doris when she realizes that she was originally imprisoned due to Darby's leaving Doris on the stand years ago back when he was a criminal lawyer. Darby then plans a day with Doris that involves driving on the Omarosa Forest Highway which is a massive dead zone with no cell service or a living soul for a hundred miles as they make their way to the Giant Scallop of Oxnard. While being driven by Doris, Darby gets a call from Stebe about Theo jack-hanging last night and how his body was found by Matt. When Darby states that they have to turn around, Doris reveals her plans of revenge on him while mentioning about Darby not showing up on the day of her trial. As Darby does not care if Doris kills him as spending time with her has been the happiest moment in his life, he states that he wanted to take Doris to the Giant Scallop of Oxnard because it is the perfect place to begin a lifelong commitment. After hearing it, Doris decides to spare Darby this time and plans to kill him the moment he missteps enough to reactivate her resentment towards him. Darby takes his leave as Doris sheds some tears. After checking out of the hospital, Theo meets up with Darby who helps Theo set up a video dating profile. Cast : Rachel Dratch as Doris, Evan Mann as Group Leader, Jamar Malachi Neighbors as Moey D, Debra Wilson as Serenity, Dave Wyndorf as Aging Rocker #1
| 15 | 5 | "Bidai" | Frederic Cristy | Evan Mann & Gareth Reynolds | March 28, 2024 | 0.20 |
Many X Games ago in Bidai, the King and Queen have outlawed Nu Metal. During dinner, General Salaad, head of the King's Army, informs the King and Queen of Bidai that their son Prince Omar was protesting the curriculum that his teacher provided. Prince Omar is given a pep talk by his parents who state that he will make a great leader of Bidai one day. When in his room, Omar sees a music video from TainT on "Rock Assault". Prince Omar becomes a fan of TainT, much to the dismay of his parents. In the present, King Omar invites Theo and Moey D to perform in Bidai after making Nu Metal legal again. Shortly after receiving their invitations from Omar, Theo and Moey D are kidnapped by the President of the United States and Agent Gubbins who inform them that Omar has a video of the President humping an ottoman. The U.S. government will be using their performance as a distraction in order to recover the video before it can be used to blackmail the President. Stebe accidentally gets into a road rage incident with a random motorist. When Moey D goes to visit his son Moey Jr., his ex-wife Janice calls him inside and tells Moey that Moey Jr. knowing that his father was a little person would cause him to stop growing. Janice also mentions her dismay of Moey D subjecting himself to physical abuse upon hearing of TainT's upcoming gig. Fearing for his life, Stebe joins Theo and Moey D on their trip to Bidai where they are accompanied by Gubbins posing as their promotional tour manager. Arriving at their suite, Stebe, Theo, and Moey D are briefed by Gubbins about the location of the floppy disk containing the footage being Omar's penthouse. While TainT is keeping Omar busy, Gubbins will search Omar's penthouse for the floppy disk and make his way on a helicopter while planning not to leave TainT behind. They meet up with Omar upon being escorted to him by General Salaad and some soldiers. As Omar plays the Moey D injury supercut, Gubbins suddenly collapses and dies. Moey D claims to Theo that Gubbins was poisoned as Stebe tries to persuade Theo to let him become the new promotional tour manager. During the argument, Salaad comes in with some soldiers voicing his condolensces for what happened to their tour manager. Salaad reveals that the promotional tour manager is an operative of the U.S. government and that he and TainT intend to steal the floppy disk from Omar's vault. At TainT's performance, Moey D stands up to Theo as Stebe tries to save the show. As Salaad advises Omar to give the order, Theo reminds him that he is a member of TainT Nation. Omar then turns against Salaad and shoots the soldiers with him. Both Omar and Salaad are wounded. Omar then gives Theo the floppy disk and gives Stebe a key fob to a car. Stebe drives Theo and Moey D away from the arriving soldiers while ramming Salaad in the process. During the drive to the other tower, Theo apologizes to Moey D. The irate motorist catches up to Stebe. In a turn of events, the motorist buys Stebe, Theo, and Moey D time to get to the other tower as he takes in the bullets. At Moey D's persuasion, Theo tosses Moey D and the rope that's tied to him to the other side as Stebe and Theo use the rope to get across. Once at the other tower, Stebe signals the U.S. helicopter. As Stebe, Theo, and Moey D make it to the helicopter, Salaad fires an RPG at them. Just then, Omar appears from behind Salaad and beheads him with a wire. Omar gives Stebe, Theo, and Moey D the nu metal salute as they fly away. Cast : Daron Malakian as King Omar, Sunita Mani as Janice, Jamar Neighbors as Moey D, Robert Patrick as Agent Gubbins, Matt Pinfield as himself, Henry Rollins as the President of the United States, Fred Tatasciore as General Salaad
| 16 | 6 | "Tracker" | Frederic Cristy | Evan Mann & Gareth Reynolds | April 4, 2024 | 0.19 |
Deb weeps while looking at pictures of a younger Matt as she asks Stebe where they went wrong. Theo suggests that they give Matt a taste of his own medicine like what their father did to them when they were younger. The next day, Stebe and Theo put Matt through the Night of Passage, a punishment that Theodore had imposed on Stebe and Theo to turn them into rock-hard Horsby men. He must spend one night in the rugged wilderness despite the fact that there are "meth heads" and a burning garbage can nearby as Stebe and Theo depart. On the road, Stebe and Theo tell Theodore that they started the Night of Passage on Matt. Just then, a beeping is heard in the car as a panicking Stebe crashes the car into a tree. Then it catches on fire as Theo works to save Stebe, Theodore, and Theodore's wheelchair as he finds a beeping remote. Back at Royal Crackers Incorporated, Deb asks Al about a potential whistleblower. She is shown footage of a documentary where Theodore has used the natives of Catalina Island, who Theodore has named the Utzi Wutzis, as a work force. At the Bakersfield Tribune, Deb confronts editor-in-chief Carl Langey and intimidates him on the identity of the whistleblower. Carl tells Deb that the person in question is Stuart Glandville and will email Deb his address. Meanwhile, Matt does his latest attempt to impress Oscar and everyone present like making a bed out of garbage and taking out his own appendix. Stebe, Theo, and Theodore are taken to the Utzi Wutzis' village as Theodore is placed on a throne. The next day, Stebe and Theo have salvaged the car as they and Theodore pick up Matt who then tells his dad and uncle to go without him as he will get home on his own. Stebe approves and starts to drive until the car explodes. In the final scene, Deb has framed Stuart for pedophilia by planting pictures of a younger Matt in his house that the raiding SWAT officers find. Deb watches Stuart's arrest from the limousine as Stuart rants that he was set up. Cast : Eric Bauza as Stuart Glandville, Matt Servitto as Carl Langley, Stephanie Sheh as Rachel and Holly, Fred Tatasciore as Al
| 17 | 7 | "Mall" | Fredric Cristy | Evan Mann & Gareth Reynolds | April 11, 2024 | 0.15 |
Many moons ago at the Bakersfield Mall, everyone was doing their shopping and other types of Mall stuff. When a younger Stebe tries to propose to a girl named Brenda Cokono, she backs up enough for her pant leg to get caught on the escalator and then dragged under the escalator to a violent death. In the present, the Bakersfield Mall has become haunted. The Mayor of Bakersfield and Officer Smith are told that they must close down the Bakersfield Mall or else they will be doomed. As the Mayor of Bakersfield and other patrons are killed, Warwick states to Theo that he used to be the manager of Tower Records the day when a young girl was "eaten alive by the first floor escalator". Upon showing Theo a book he found on Spender's Gifts called So You Want to Learn About Witchcraft the day when Bakersfield Mall was closed, Warwick states that he once used it to cast a spell in Bakersfield Mall which ultimately opened a portal to the Netherworld allowing the ghost of the girl to be released. She has been haunting Bakersfield Mall ever since. When Theo and Warwick catch up to Stebe, Brenda Cokono takes control of the escalator to ensnare Deb. While trying to strike the escalator with the fire axe, Stebe mentions to Deb that there was a girl that came before Deb and that Brenda died in a proposal gone wrong. As Brenda uses the escalator to drag Deb closer to her doom, Stebe finally aplogizes for what happened to Brenda, admits that they barely know each other, and that Stebe really wanted to be in love. If Brenda had not died, Stebe would have never met Deb. Brenda's ghost stops the attack on Deb and leaves for Heaven. Cast : Eric Bauza as Dr. Richards, Tim Dillon as Phil, Robert Englund as Warwick, Ana Gasteyer as the Mayor of Bakersfield, Evan Mann as Craig, Daniella Pineda as Brenda Cokono, Gareth Reynolds as the Build-a-Dillo Owner
| 18 | 8 | "Rachel" | Frederic Cristy | Christy Steven McCann | April 18, 2024 | 0.26 |
At the Hornsby mansion, Rachel is having dinner with the Hornsby family as they talk about Rachel's upcoming marketing presentation and is asked by Stebe if it will be promotion worthy. Rachel sees a signal on her television which she recognizes causing her to open a secret passageway that leads deep underground to an underground kingdom called Subterra. It is then revealed that Rachel is actually a small mushroom person as she meets with her mother Queen Vasha and her fellow mushroom people. After dismissing her core operatives, Queen Varsha speaks with Rachel at their palace. Varsha tells Rachel that Dr. Queequeg has finished making a new Land Rover and will be having Rachel's older sister Robin operate it to make sure that Rachel succeeds in her mission. Robin unveils RC Snackitz, two delicious saltine crackers sandwiching a spread of their own design, which proves to be a worldwide success. Rachel is later summoned to Queen Vasha where she finds that they captured Dan, a delivery man who regularly delivers to Rachel. General Gil and Dr. Queequeg subject Dan to a special frequency after he eats the RC Snackitz, causing him to sprout purple growths and die. At Royal Crackers Incorporated, Rachel states that they need to stop production of RC Snackitz immediately, but Stebe assumes that Rachel is merely jealous of Robin. Robin, General Gila, and Dr. Queequeg load fungicide into Rachel's house while she sleeps. After barely making it to her Land Rover, Rachel evacuates as her hermit crab Francesca dies from the fungicide. In retaliation for the attempt on her life, Rachel sends a bomb to Subterra, killing all of the mushroom people. Cast : Eric Bauza as Dan, Tia Carrere as Queen Vasha, Michaela Dietz as Robin, Stephanie Sheh as Rachel, Fred Tatasciore as Al, Dr. Chooch, and General Gila
| 19 | 9 | "Prison" | Frederic Cristy | Evan Mann & Gareth Reynolds | April 25, 2024 | 0.16 |
Used by the FBI, Theo enters Stebe's office at Royal Crackers Incorporated and tricks Stebe into signing an FBI Admission for Wrongdoing that includes illegal labor and embezzlement. Stebe is sent to prison, but finds that its quality of life is very high. Some time later, Stebe is told by Warden Sandy that Theo is not getting along swimmingly with the other inmates. Later that night, Stebe begins his plot by going into the rec room and hiding the remote control in sand. The inmates get hostile towards Theo after learning that a new remote control may not arrive for another week. In the ensuing fight, Theo is stabbed. Stebe wakes up as it is revealed that the preceding events had been a dream. Stebe had been in a coma for a week, having been stabbed shortly after entering prison. After viewing the security footage, the judge downgrades Stebe's sentence to community service. Cast : Peter Serafinowicz as Warden Sandy, Fred Tatasciore as Charles
| 20 | 10 | "Dog" | Frederic Cristy | Jason Ruiz | May 2, 2024 | 0.19 |
In a flashback, Factory 6 is destroyed in a fire, with Theodore being injured by shrapnel. In the present, Matt is dropped off by a taxi cab driver outside the Factory 6 Exclusion Zone with the taxi cab driver claiming that Cone Zone that his parents sent him to is located here. As Matt enters the Factory 6 Exclusion Zone, he finds a pit bull that chases him to the top of a hill where he sees some hazmat workers overseeing the Utzi Wutzis. When a seagull gives Matt away to some hazmat workers, an unnatural tornado occurs causing the hazmat workers to get to the bunker. Matt is then saved by the pit bull who gets him to safety. Returning to the Hornsby mansion, Matt hides the pit bull in Theodore's room where it ends up attacking him enough for Theodore to be awoken from his sleep state. As Matt hides the pit bull under the bed, Stebe, Deb, and Theo come up to find Theodore on the door in a beaten-up state. They assume Matt attacked Theodore and scold him upon assuming that he did it out of retaliation for decorating the Christmas tree without him. The pit bull, named Dog by Matt, it set to be euthanized due to its attacks on Theodore. However, Dog breaks free of its shackles, attacks the hazmat workers, and frees the Hornsby family. Before Jonathan can kill Dog, Stebe manages to punch Jonathan away. Then Dog pulls the remains of the vehicle towards the Hornsby family as they escape the tornado and the Factory 6 Exclusion Zone. Jonathan returns home as his wife gets no answer on if he picked up the milk. Going to the shed where he had put up a shrine of worship towards Theodore with the same irradiated booming onion Royal Crackers box present, Jonathan commits suicide by eating irradiated crackers. In another flashback, an Utzi Wutzi named Utzilias is tending to an elderly and dying Marjorie who wishes that she could have kept her promise to see her sons one more time. Back in the present, Al takes the Hornsby family and Dog's picture as Theodore's closed eyes move slightly. The final flashback shown that a ritualist was brought in with a pit bull body confiscated from animal control as he performs a ritual that transfers Marjorie's life force into the body of the pit bull. Cast : Eric Bauza as Utzi Wutzi, Rhys Darby as Jonathan, Cordelia Mann as Little Theo
