= Bobby Lee =

American comedian (born 1971)

- Lee in 2026
- Born: Robert Young Lee Jr. September 17, 1971 (age 55); San Diego, California, U.S.
- Education: Palomar College (dropped out)
- Occupations: Actor; comedian; podcaster

Comedy career
- Years active: 1994–present
- Medium: Stand-up; film; television; podcast
- Genres: Observational comedy; black comedy; blue comedy
- Subjects: Human behavior; human sexuality; American politics; gender differences

Robert Young Lee Jr. (born September 17, 1971) is an American stand-up comedian, actor, and podcaster. Across the span of his career, he has appeared in several films and television series. Lee also co-hosts the podcasts Bad Friends with fellow comedian Andrew Santino and TigerBelly with his former partner Khalyla Kuhn.

From 2001 to 2009, Lee was a cast member on MADtv, and he co-starred in the ABC single-camera sitcom series Splitting Up Together alongside Jenna Fischer and Oliver Hudson between 2018 and 2019. Lee has also appeared in the films Harold & Kumar Go to White Castle (2004), Pineapple Express (2008), and The Dictator (2012). He had a guest appearance as the cynical, burned-out Dr. Kang on FX on Hulu's TV comedy series Reservation Dogs.

== Early life and education ==
Lee was born on September 17, 1971 in San Diego to Korean immigrant parents Jeanie and Robert Lee. He and his younger brother Steve grew up in Poway, California. His parents owned clothing stores in both Escondido and Encinitas, California. He attended Painted Rock Elementary School, Twin Peaks Middle School, and Poway High School. In high school, he was part of a breakdancing team. After graduation, he attended Palomar College before dropping out.

== Career ==
Lee worked at cafes and restaurants before pursuing a career in comedy. In 1994, the coffee shop where he was working abruptly closed. Lee stated: "I just went next door to get a job, which was The Comedy Store in San Diego". After a few months of working odd jobs at the club, he tried stand-up during one of their amateur nights. Within a year of doing regular comedy sets, he received offers to open for both Pauly Shore and Carlos Mencia. He then began working regularly at The Comedy Store in Los Angeles, a comedy club owned by Pauly Shore's mother Mitzi.

Lee has said that his parents had hoped he would continue on with the family business and were less than supportive of his comedic pursuits at first. During a podcast interview conducted by fellow actor and comedian Joe Rogan on February 1, 2011, Lee stated that during the first few years he did stand-up, his parents barely spoke to him. However, after his appearance on The Tonight Show with Jay Leno, his father called him, asked how much he had to pay to be on the show, and then apologized for not supporting his comedy career. Lee has included his family in some of his work; his brother has appeared in several non-speaking roles on MADtv, and his entire immediate family has appeared in a sketch on the show. In 2007, he pitched a sitcom to Comedy Central about a Korean family, which was to star his own family.

In 2012, Lee was hired to reboot Maker Studios' YouTube comedy channel, The Station. Lee hosted the 9th MusiCares MAP Fund Benefit Concert in 2013. From 2019 to 2023, Lee made several appearances as recurring character Jin Jeong in the Magnum P.I. television series. In 2020, Lee began co-hosting the Bad Friends podcast with Andrew Santino.

=== MADtv ===
In 2001, Lee joined the cast of MADtv, making him the show's first and only Asian cast member. He has stated that he dreaded playing the characters Bae Sung and Connie Chung, as well as the "Average Asian" skits. Lee remained with the cast until the series' cancellation in 2009 and returned briefly when MADtv was revived in 2016 on The CW.

=== TigerBelly podcast ===
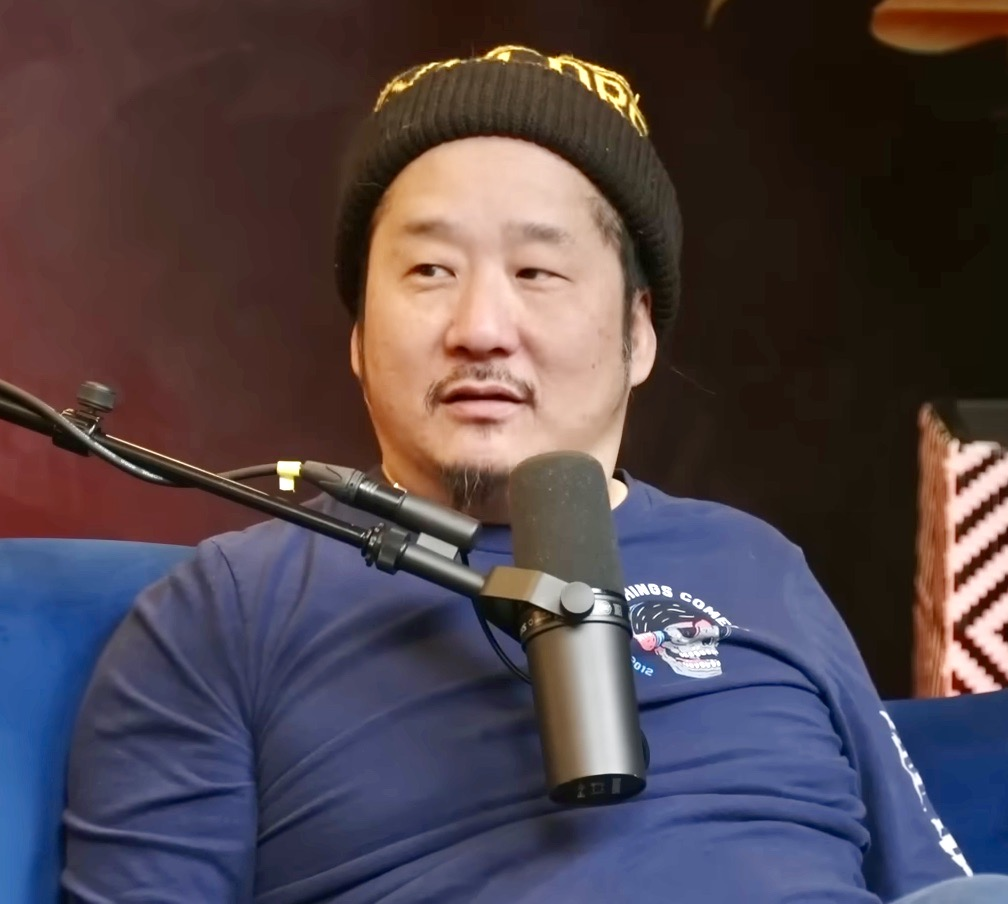
Lee in 2023

TigerBelly
- Genre: Talk
- Format: Audio & Video
- Language: English

Cast and voices
- Hosted by: Bobby Lee; Khalyla Kuhn

Production
- Production: Bobby Lee; Khalyla Kuhn; Gilbert Galon; George Kimmel; Bryce Hallock
- Length: 60–90 minutes

Publication
- No. of episodes: 562 (as of March 10, 2026)
- Original release: September 1, 2015 – present

Related
- Website: TheTigerBelly.com

Starting in 2015, TigerBelly is a video podcast hosted by Lee and his former partner, Khalyla Kuhn. It also features appearances by technical engineer Gilbert Galon and producer George Kimmel. The show's intro song "Shadow Gook" was written and produced by Lee and performed by Lee and Kuhn. The hosts discuss events from their lives and news topics from popular culture, often revolving around Asian American issues related to the entertainment industry, adolescence, sexuality, ethnicity, racism and politics.

Prior to the creation of TigerBelly, Lee and fellow comedian Erik Griffin pitched a podcast to All Things Comedy but never developed the show. While Kuhn was recovering from heart surgery, she developed a podcast as a way to occupy herself. Lee assisted her with its creation and eventually appeared on her show. He then decided to focus on a podcast with Kuhn instead of with Griffin.

In April 2023, podcast clips of Lee telling a story of an experience with a young, adult prostitute in Tijuana resurfaced. USA Today reported that the anecdote drew online backlash and allegations of child exploitation. During an episode of TigerBelly in the same month, Lee clarified that the story was not true and had been "a dark joke" pieced together from "a couple of awful bits".

=== Riyadh Comedy Festival ===
In 2025, Lee participated in the Riyadh Comedy Festival. Joey Shea, Saudi Arabia researcher at Human Rights Watch, said in a statement that the Saudi government is using the comedy festival to whitewash its human rights abuses.

== Personal life ==
Lee began taking methamphetamine and marijuana around age 12, as well as heroin by age 15, and went through three drug-rehabilitation attempts before becoming sober when he was 17. Lee relapsed on Vicodin and ended 12 years of sobriety after receiving negative feedback from a producer. He got sober after MADtv producer Lauren Dombrowski fought for him after he was fired from the show a second time, a story which Lee discusses in his appearance on the pilot episode of Comedy Central's TV series This Is Not Happening. On TigerBelly episode 224, Lee admitted to guest Theo Von that he had relapsed after his father's death in August 2019 from Parkinson's disease. He subsequently went to rehab and became sober again. Lee has stated that he is a recovering alcoholic.

Lee's younger brother, Steve Lee, is a musician, podcaster, and comedian.

He was in a ten-year relationship with Khalyla Kuhn, an influencer and content creator. The relationship ended in 2022.

Lee has stated that he believes in God, but does not adhere to a specific religion, calling the core principles of Christianity "insane" on George Janko's podcast in 2024.

== Filmography ==
=== Film ===
Year	Title	Role	Notes
1999	The Underground Comedy Movie	Chinese Man	
2003	Pauly Shore Is Dead	Delivery Boy	
2003	American Misfits	Korean General	Direct-to-video
2004	Harold & Kumar Go to White Castle	Kenneth Park	
2005	Accidentally on Purpose	Bobby	Short film
2006	Undoing	Kenny	
2007	Kickin' It Old Skool	Aki	
2008	Killer Pad	Winnie	
2008	Pineapple Express	Bobby	
2008	Larry of Arabia	Bobby	Short film
2009	Soldiers of Capernaum		Direct-to-video
2010	Fudgy Wudgy Fudge Face	Kangaroo Hands	
2010	Hard Breakers	Travis	
2011	Paul	Valet	
2011	A Very Harold & Kumar 3D Christmas	Kenneth Park	
2012	The Dictator	Mr. Lao	
2013	Final Recipe	Park	
2013	Wedding Palace	Kevin	
2013	Jesus is My Co-Pilot	Himself	Short film
2014	Meet Me at the Reck	Himself	Direct-to-video
2014	Bro, What Happened?	Brah Man	
2014	Out of Love	Stanley	Short film
2015	The Comments	Hugh	Short film
2016	Laid in America	Goose	
2016	Keeping Up with the Joneses	Ricky Lu	
2018	Curious Georgina	Bobby	Short film
2018	Public Disturbance	Chuck	
2019	Extracurricular Activities	Mr. Mulnick	
2020	The Wrong Missy	Check-In Desk Employee	
2020	Guest House	Benny	
2021	Wish Dragon	Tall Goon	Voice
2021	How It Ends	Derek	
2021	Hero Mode	VP Goodson	
2023	Death and Ramen	Timmy Lee	Short film
2023	The Throwback	Charles	
2024	Drugstore June	Bill	
2024	Sweet Dreams	Cruise	
2024	Borderlands	Larry	
2025	Happy Gilmore 2	Himself	
2025	Nimrods	Otis	
2026	Goat	Rusty Bus Boys	Voice

=== Television ===
Year	Title	Role	Notes
1999	Arli$$		Episode: "D-Day"
2001	Late Friday	Himself	Episode #1.19
2001	The Brothers García	Pet Store Clerk	Episode: "But Football Is a Religion"
2001–2009, 2016	Mad TV	Himself / Cast Member	Featured cast (season 7 & 15), main cast (season 8–14)
2004	I Love the '90s	Himself	2 episodes
2004	Faking It	Himself	Episode: "Fireman to Funnyman"
2005	Minding the Store	Himself	Episodes: "Makeover" & "La Jolla"
2005	The Drop	Himself	Episode #3.14
2005	Party @ the Palms	Chu	Episode #1.6
2005	Curb Your Enthusiasm	Sung	Episode: "The Korean Bookie"
2005–2006	Mind of Mencia	Asian CSI Agent / Gay Pirate	2 episodes
2006	Icons	Himself	Episode: "Jamie Kennedy"
2006	Comedy Zen	Himself	Episode #1.4"
2006	Thugaboo: Sneaker Madness	Mr. Lee Young / William Hung	Voice; television film
2007	American Dad!	Danny	Voice; episode: "Bush Comes to Dinner"
2007–2014	Chelsea Lately	Himself / Round Table Guest	Recurring guest
2008	Asian Excellence Awards	Himself / Host	Main host
2009	Live at Gotham	Himself / Host	Episode: "Episode #4.2"
2009	Whorified! The Search for America's Next Top Whore	Himself	Episode: "Reality TV Made Me Do It"
2009	Family Guy	Sharply Dressed Asian Man	Voice; episode: "Business Guy"
2009	The League	Chu	Episode: "The Usual Bet"
2009–2019	Laugh Factory	Himself	Recurring guest
2010	Supreme Court of Comedy	Himself	Episode: "Tom Arnold vs. Bobby Lee"
2010	Ktown Cowboys	Himself	Episode: "Episode #1.9"
2010	Cubed	Bob Yamamoto	Recurring cast (season 1), guest (season 2)
2011	After Lately	Himself	Episode: "The 'M' Word"
2011	Big Time Rush	T.J.	Episode: "Big Time Reality"
2011	Family Guy	Chinese Man	Voice; episode: "Amish Guy"
2012	Equals Three	Himself	Episode: "Spelling Bee"
2012	Samurai! Daycare	Park	Recurring cast
2012	RVC: The Lone Shopping Network	Hiri	Episode: "Father of My Squids"
2012–2013	Animal Practice	Dr. Yamamoto	Main cast
2013	Who Gets the Last Laugh?	Himself	Episode: "Bam Margera/Bobby Lee/Matt Besser"
2013	Gotham Comedy Live	Himself / Host	Episode: "Bobby Lee"
2013	Knife Fight	Himself	Episode: "Travi vs. Kuramoto"
2013	Internet Shock Quiz	Himself	Episode: "Bobby Lee's Racist Confession"
2013	Arrested Development	Mrs. Oh	Episode: "Queen B."
2013	Tubbin' with Tash	Tiger Belly	Episodes: "Chelsea Handler" & "Chelsea Peretti & Reggie Watts"
2013	Sean Saves the World	Mr. Kim	Episode: "Sean Comes Clean"
2013–2014	Kill Tony	Himself / Guest Host	Episodes: "Kill Tony #9" & "Kill Tony #32"
2013–2014	Deal with It	Himself	Recurring cast (season 1), guest (season 3)
2013–2015	The Awesomes	Tim / Sumo	Voice; main cast
2014	TripTank	Mongolian / Mongolian Leader / Li Ching	Voice; episode: "The Green" & "Candy Van Finger Bang"
2014	The League	Lee Wei Lee	Episode: "Epi Sexy"
2014–2016	This Is Not Happening	Himself	Recurring guest
2015	The Comedians	Fortune Teller's nephew	Episode: "Billy's Birthday"
2015	NCIS: Los Angeles	Rio Syamsundin	Episode: "Blame It on Rio"
2015–2016	Bad Weather Films	Himself	2 episodes
2015–2019	Nature Cat	MC Ferret	Voice; recurring cast (season 1–3)
2016	Jeff Ross Presents Roast Battle	Himself / Judge	Episode: "Road to Roast Battle"
2016	@midnight	Himself	Episode: "Episode #4.6"
2016	Another Period	Sea Captain	Episode: "Lillian's Wedding" & "The Duel"
2016	Son of Zorn	Jakton	Episode: "The War of the Workplace"
2016–2018	Love	Truman	Recurring cast
2017	The Comedy Jam	Himself	Episode: "Tiffany Haddish/Chris Hardwick/Bobby Lee"
2017	Funny You Should Ask	Himself	Recurring guest
2017	Comrade Detective	New York Degenerate	Voice; episode: "Two Films for One Ticket"
2017	What Would Diplo Do?	Brian	Main cast
2017	Real Rob	Kim Lin	Episode: "Best Play Date Ever"
2018	Something’s Burning	Himself	Episode: "Bobby Lee & Chris D'Elia Make Homemade Pasta w/ Bert Kreischer"
2018	Alone Together	Stan	Episode: "Pop-Up"
2018	NCIS: Los Angeles	Jeff Carol	Episode: "Goodbye, Vietnam"
2018–2019	Splitting Up Together	Arthur	Main cast
2019	Family Style	Himself	Episode: "Sweets"
2019	Beyond the Arc	Himself	Episode: "Montreal"
2019–2023	Magnum P.I.	Jin	Recurring cast (season 2-4), guest (season 5)
2020	Game On!	Himself / Captain	Main captain
2020	The Stand-Up Show with Jon Dore	Himself	Episode: "Episode #1.5"
2020	The Cabin with Bert Kreischer	Himself	Episode: "Release"
2020	The Comedy Store	Himself	Main guest
2020	Dream Corp LLC	Tricky Ricky	Recurring cast (season 3)
2021	Fast Foodies	Himself	Episode: "Bobby Lee"
2021	Nailed It!	Himself / Guest Judge	Episode: "Travel Dos and Donuts"
2021	Well Done with Sebastian Maniscalco	Himself	Episode: "The Macaroniscalco"
2021	Immoral Compass	Dylan	Episode: "Part 2: Secrets"
2021–2022	Reservation Dogs	Dr. Kang	Guest (season 1), recurring cast (season 2)
2021–2022	Inside Job	Dr. Andre	Voice; main cast
2021–2023	And Just Like That...	Jackie Nee	Recurring cast
2022	About Last Night	Himself	Episode: "Anna Camp/Loni Love/Bobby Lee"
2022	Dark Side of Comedy	Himself	Episode: "Andrew Dice Clay"
2023	History of the World, Part II	Harold	Episode: "VI"
2024	Dinner Time Live with David Chang	Himself	Episode: "Choose Your Own Adventure Volume 2"
2026	Sun Chaser	Guards 1 and 2	Voice
2026	Tires	Ricky	Episode: "Volley"

=== Video games ===
Year	Title	Role	Notes
2026	Grand Theft Auto VI	Andre Ye	

=== Music videos ===
Year	Title	Artist	Role	Notes
2009	"We Made You"	Eminem	Hikaru Sulu	
2010	"2 Different Tears"	Wonder Girls		
2011	"Hangover"	Taio Cruz	Captain	
2017	"Dure Dure"	Jencarlos Canela		

=== Documentary ===
Year	Title	Role	Notes
2007	Heckler	Himself	
2016	Dying Laughing	Himself	
2017	Funny: The Documentary	Himself	
2020	Happy Happy Joy Joy: The Ren and Stimpy Story	Himself	
