= Royal Crackers =

American adult animated sitcom

- Genre: Adult animation; Animated sitcom; Black comedy; Cringe comedy; Surreal comedy
- Created by: Jason Ruiz
- Developed by: Jason Ruiz; Seth Cohen
- Voices of: Jason Ruiz; Jessica St. Clair; Andrew Santino; Maile Flanagan; David Gborie
- Composer: Frank Ciampi
- Country of origin: United States
- Original language: English
- No. of seasons: 2
- No. of episodes: 20 (list of episodes)

Production
- Executive producers: Jason Ruiz; Seth Cohen; Chris Prynoski (Note: Executive producer for Titmouse); Shannon Prynoski; Antonio Canobbio Ben Kalina; Walter Newman (Note: Executive producer for Williams Street, season 1 only); Cameron Tang (Note: Executive producer for Williams Street, season 2-present)
- Producers: Robbee Jones; Paige Boudreau (Note: Producer for Williams Street); Jonathan Roig
- Editor: Benjamin Martian
- Running time: 22 minutes
- Production companies: The Cheesesteak Factory; AntiLaugh; Titmouse, Inc.; Williams Street

Original release
- Network: Adult Swim
- Release: April 2, 2023 – May 2, 2024

Royal Crackers is an American adult animated sitcom created by Jason Ruiz and developed by Ruiz and Seth Cohen for Cartoon Network's Adult Swim programming block. The series stars Ruiz, Andrew Santino, Jessica St. Clair, Maile Flanagan, and David Gborie. The series premiered on April 2, 2023.

On March 28, 2023, it was announced the series was renewed for a second season which premiered on February 29, 2024.

== Plot ==
The dysfunctional Hornsby family run Royal Crackers Incorporated, a once-popular snack food company which manufactures saltine crackers in Bakersfield, California. When senile patriarch and CEO Theodore Hornsby Sr.'s mind starts to slip, his two sons Stebe and Theodore "Theo" Jr. are left to run the failing company while living in their father's mansion with Stebe's wife Deb and their son Matt as they deal with competition from Dennison Snacks and experience different misadventures along the way.

== Characters ==
=== Main ===
- Stebe Hornsby (voiced by Jason Ruiz) is one of the heirs of Royal Crackers Incorporated. He is professional and nerdy, and plays the straight man to Theo's antics. Stebe does however behave eccentrically himself at times. He is shown to be inattentive toward his son, instead focused on currying favor with his father and their company. He was intended to be named Steven only for his father to intentionally misspell it on his birth certificate out of contempt for his newborn son's seeming anorchia.
- Deborah "Deb" Hornsby (voiced by Jessica St. Clair) is Stebe's wife. She is on the board of directors at Royal Crackers Incorporated and is in charge of the Hornsby family's social media accounts. Like her husband, she is inattentive toward her son and focused on her in-laws' business.
- Theodore "Theo" D. Hornsby Jr. (voiced by Andrew Santino as an adult, Cordelia Mann as a child) is Stebe's younger brother. A former nu metal star, the bass player/lead singer of TainT and one of the heirs of Royal Crackers Incorporated, he appears narcissistic with delusions of grandeur and seems to be in denial about his status as a has-been.
- Matthew "Matt" Hornsby (voiced by Maile Flanagan) is Stebe and Deb's only child. An introvert who loves video games, he is reserved with his family as a means of coping with their toxic culture.
- Theodore D. Hornsby Sr. (voiced by Jason Ruiz) is the elderly CEO of Royal Crackers Incorporated and the father of Stebe and Theo. Due to his old age, he almost always appears unconscious, seated motionless in his wheelchair unless something briefly rouses him. In flashbacks, he is shown to have been a ruthless robber baron who committed various atrocities and ran his company with an iron fist.
- Darby Blarchardt (voiced by David Gborie) is the Hornsby family's lawyer and former criminal defense lawyer who works at Blarchardt & Associates. While he generally presents as competent and professional, he occasionally proves to be eccentric and irresponsible.

=== Recurring ===
- Alfred "Al" Winstanley (voiced by Fred Tatasciore) is a Russian-American board member with a long Shenandoah beard who has been with Royal Crackers Incorporated since its early days. He is very old-fashioned, often offering up archaic advice. Flashbacks show him to have been a loyal and virtuous subordinate to Theodore Sr. since the early days of Royal Crackers Incorporated.
- Rachel (voiced by Stephanie Sheh) is a Royal Crackers board member. She appears to be an Asian-American woman and seems to be the most normal person on the board. In the season 2 episode named after her, it is revealed that Rachel is actually a member of a race of small anthropomorphic mushrooms who live in an underground kingdom called Subterra. Her human body is actually a vehicle (called a "land rover") that she pilots from a seat inside the head.
- Moey D (voiced by Jamar Malachi Neighbors) is a dwarf and the former hype man of TainT who works as the manager of Kenny's Lobster Shack. He is a parody of Joe C.
- Clair Bailey (voiced by Debra Wilson) is a news anchor for CVM.
- Marjorie Bartleby-Hornsby (voiced by Jessica St. Clair) is Theodore Sr.'s wife and Stebe and Theo's mother. Her side of the family were swamp-dwelling cannibals who Theodore Sr. encountered and narrowly escaped. A ritualist performed a magic ritual which transferred her soul into the body of a pit bull.
- The Dennison family are the rivals of the Hornsby family. Their company Dennison Snacks is a more successful competitor to Royal Crackers:
  - Rob Dennison (voiced by Andy Daly) is the Co-CEO of Dennison Snacks and the son of its founder Luther Dennison. He relies on Stebe to help with his Wi-Fi issues and hosts a "Guys' Night" that Stebe wants to be invited to.
  - Mel Dennison (voiced by Lennon Parham) is the wife of Rob and Co-CEO of Dennison Snacks. She is Deb's rival.
  - Sebastian Dennison (voiced by Kyle Dunnigan in season two) is Rob and Mel's oldest son. He is popular kid, an aspiring rapper, and a bully to Matt.
  - Sarah Dennison is Rob and Mel's oldest daughter.
  - Hailey Dennison is Rob and Mel's daughter.
  - "The Twins" are a pair of fraternal twins, son and daughter to Rob and Mel. Their names have not been revealed and they are only ever referred to as "the Twins".
  - Gus Dennison is Rob and Mel's youngest son.
- Mr. P (voiced by Fred Tatasciore) is a teacher at J. Davis High.
- The Utzi Wutzis (variously voiced by Eric Bauza and Fred Tatasciore) are the short cat-like natives of Catalina Island.

== Episodes ==
Season	Episodes	Originally released	
Season	Episodes	First released	Last released
1	10	April 2, 2023	May 21, 2023
2	10	February 29, 2024	May 2, 2024

== Release ==
On April Fools' Day 2023, Adult Swim aired a 1-minute clip of the premiere as part of their annual April Fools prank as well as to promote the first season, which would officially premiere the next night, though they released the full episode on their YouTube channel weeks prior.

As promotion for its second season, Adult Swim aired the show on their sister networks TBS and TNT.
