= Bad Friends (podcast) =

2020 comedy podcast

- Genre: Comedy; Talk
- Language: English

Cast and voices
- Hosted by: Andrew Santino; Bobby Lee

Production
- Length: 60–120 minutes

Publication
- No. of episodes: 291
- Original release: February 17, 2020 – present
- Provider: 7EQUIS
- Updates: Weekly (Monday)

Related
- Related shows: TigerBelly
- Website: www.badfriendsmerch.com

Bad Friends is a comedy podcast hosted by American comedians Andrew Santino and Bobby Lee. Its first episode was released on February 17, 2020, and new episodes are released weekly each Monday. Episodes feature discussions between Santino and Lee that may include current events, improvised sketches, advice, mental health support, fictional characters, and celebrity guests.

In 2023, the podcast toured the United States and Canada. In 2024, the podcast toured Australia, New Zealand, and Asia, and in 2025 the podcast toured the UK and Ireland for two shows back-to-back. Performing at the OVO Arena, Wembley on July 18 and performing at 3Arena Dublin on July 19.

On May 22, 2024, Hulu announced it had acquired an exclusive development deal with Santino and Lee to produce an animated series based on the podcast. Several major adult animation developers competed for this deal.

== Cast ==
=== Main ===
- Andrew Santino as himself (co-host) and various characters (2020–present)
- Bobby Lee as himself (co-host) and various characters (2020–present)

=== Crew ===
- George Kimmel as himself, producer (2020–present)
- Andres Rosende Novo as "Fancy B," producer (2020–present)
- Pete Forthun as himself, production (2020–present)
- Carlos Herrera as himself, production (2022–present)
- McKone Corkery as himself, production (2023–present)

=== Recurring ===
- Juliana Omega as "Rudy Jules" (named after Rudy Giuliani) (2020–present)
- Doc Willis as himself (2021–present)
- Jessie "Jetski" Johnson as "Juicy," "Jetski," and various characters (2023–2024)
- Graig Agop as "The Goop" (2023–present)
- Dax Flame as himself (2024-present)
