= Kurt Metzger =

American comedian and actor

- Metzger in 2016
- Born: Kurt Austin Metzger; May 24, 1977 (age 49); U.S.
- Occupations: Stand-up comedian; political commentator
- Years active: 2003–present

Comedy career
- Medium: Stand-up, television, podcasting
- Genres: Observational comedy, dark comedy, shock humor, off-color humor, insult comedy, satire
- Subjects: Everyday life, current events, politics, political correctness, pop culture, human behavior, race relations, racism, religion

Instagram information
- Page: Kurt Metzger
- Years active: 2018–present
- Followers: 74.9 thousand (December 5, 2025)

X information
- Handle: @kurtmetzger
- Years active: 2009–present
- Topics: Stand-up comedy, politics, current events and opinions
- Followers: 143.5 thousand (December 5, 2025)

YouTube information
- Channel: Kurt Metzger
- Years active: 2006–present
- Subscribers: 41.2 thousand (December 6, 2025)
- Views: 1.8 million (December 6, 2025)
- Website: kurtmetzgercomedy.com

Kurt Austin Metzger (born May 24, 1977) is an American stand-up comedian, writer, actor, political commentator, podcaster and YouTube personality. He won an Emmy Award and a Peabody Award for his work on the television series Inside Amy Schumer between 2013 and 2016.

== Early life ==
Kurt Austin Metzger was raised in Toms River, New Jersey. He was raised as a Jehovah's Witness and became an ordained minister at the age of 17; he left the faith at about the age of 21. As a child, he enjoyed watching An Evening at the Improv and Comic Strip Live.

== Career ==
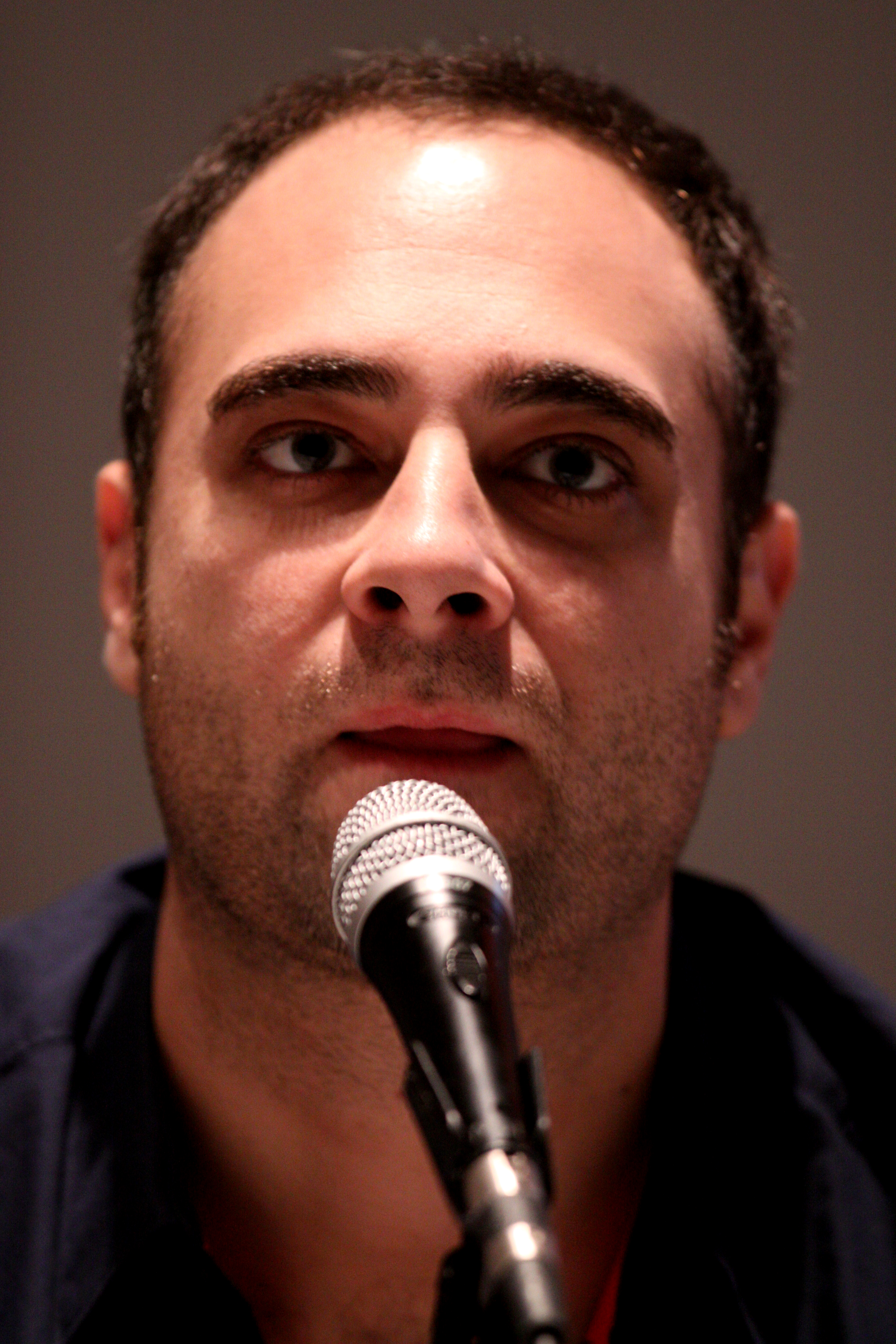
Metzger on the Ugly Americans panel at San Diego Comic-Con in 2010

Metzger first performed stand-up at The Stress Factory in New Brunswick, New Jersey, although he mainly performed in the Philadelphia area during his early career; he then moved on to perform in the comedy clubs of New York City.

In 2006, Metzger performed on Showtime's White Boyz in the Hood as well as Comedy Central's Live at Gotham the following year. In 2009, he appeared in an episode of the IFC series Z Rock.

His debut album Kurt Metzger Talks to Young People About Sex was released in 2011 by Comedy Central Records. Comedy Central also released his half-hour special as part of Comedy Central Presents in 2009. His one-hour special, White Precious is available on Comedy Central.

Metzger appeared on The Late Late Show with Craig Ferguson on February 7, 2011.

In 2013, Metzger feuded with Jude Doyle and Lindy West via Facebook and Twitter during a defense of rape humor.

From 2013 to 2016, Metzger wrote on 39 episodes of Inside Amy Schumer. He was nominated for four Emmy Awards and won one Emmy for the sketch "Girl, You Don't Need Makeup". He also appeared in sketches featured on the show.

In 2015, Metzger was a semi-finalist on Last Comic Standing; a bit he performed about Mohammed Atta won him "best joke" on the show.

On August 16, 2016, Metzger faced controversy for writing a Facebook post about comedian Aaron Glaser, who was accused of rape. Following the controversy surrounding Metzger's comments, Amy Schumer stated on Twitter that Metzger no longer worked for her on Inside Amy Schumer. Schumer later revised her comments to say that Metzger did not work for her on the show because the show was on indefinite hiatus.

Metzger co-hosted the Race Wars podcast alongside comedian Sherrod Small from 2013 to 2018. In 2019, Metzger started his own interview podcast Can't Get Right with Kurt Metzger on the GaS Digital podcasting network. In 2021, he started co-writing and performing sketch comedy and improv on fellow comedian Kyle Dunnigan's show, The Kyle Dunnigan Show. In 2022, he became a regular co-host on Jimmy Dore's political commentary and comedy show, The Jimmy Dore Show.

Metzger has also appeared on the second and third seasons of Jeff Ross Presents Roast Battle, @midnight, The Nightly Show with Larry Wilmore, This Is Not Happening, Late Night with Jimmy Fallon, Comedy Knockout, What’s Your F@#King Deal!?!, The Approval Matrix and more. He was a series regular alongside Alan Alda, Jessica Lange, Steve Buscemi and Edie Falco on Horace and Pete in 2016. He voiced the role of Randall on Comedy Central's Ugly Americans.

Metzger has also periodically appeared on The Joe Rogan Experience (episodes 667, 1093, 1462, 1707, 1903, 2125, 2265, 2298, 2434 and 2570).

Metzger has also appeared on Your Welcome with Michael Malice (episodes 323 and 362).
