= Goat (2026 film) =

Sony Pictures Animation film

- Theatrical release poster
- Directed by: Tyree Dillihay
- Screenplay by: Aaron Buchsbaum; Teddy Riley
- Story by: Nicolas Curcio; Peter Chiarelli
- Based on: Funky Dunks (Note: The book is unpublished. The film was primarily inspired by a single chapter, "Farm Team".) by Chris Tougas
- Produced by: Michelle Raimo Kouyate; Rodney Rothman; Adam Rosenberg; Stephen Curry; Erick Peyton
- Starring: Caleb McLaughlin; Gabrielle Union; Aaron Pierre; Nicola Coughlan; David Harbour; Nick Kroll; Jenifer Lewis; Patton Oswalt; Jelly Roll; Jennifer Hudson; Sherry Cola; Eduardo Franco; Andrew Santino; Bobby Lee; Stephen Curry
- Cinematography: John Clark
- Edited by: Clare Knight
- Music by: Kris Bowers
- Production companies: Columbia Pictures; Sony Pictures Animation; Unanimous Media; Modern Magic
- Distributed by: Sony Pictures Releasing
- Release dates: February 6, 2026 (Los Angeles); February 13, 2026 (United States)
- Running time: 100 minutes
- Country: United States
- Language: English
- Budget: $80–90 million
- Box office: $195.3 million

Goat (stylized in all caps) is a 2026 American animated sports comedy film directed by Tyree Dillihay, in his feature directorial debut, and produced by Columbia Pictures and Sony Pictures Animation in association with Unanimous Media and Modern Magic. It stars Caleb McLaughlin as Will Harris, an anthropomorphic goat who aspires to become the greatest of all time at a basketball-like sport known as roarball. Gabrielle Union, Aaron Pierre, Nicola Coughlan, David Harbour, Nick Kroll, Jenifer Lewis, Patton Oswalt, Jelly Roll, Jennifer Hudson, Sherry Cola, Eduardo Franco, Andrew Santino, and Bobby Lee also star, alongside basketball player Stephen Curry (who also produced) in his film debut.

Goat was being developed by 2019 and announced in May 2024, with most of the cast being announced in June 2025. It premiered in Los Angeles on February 6, 2026, and was released in the United States on February 13, 2026, by Sony Pictures Releasing. The film received favorable reviews from critics and grossed $195.3 million worldwide.

== Plot ==
In a world of anthropomorphic animals, on his birthday, young goat Will Harris aspires to be like his idol, black panther Jett Fillmore, a roarball player for his homeland Vineland's Thorns.

Ten years later, the Thorns have not yet won all season, with Jett asking team owner, warthog Florence "Flo" Everson, to do whatever she can to complete and make the team by finding a sixth player. Meanwhile, a young adult Will, now working at a diner and practicing roarball, is struggling to pay his apartment rent to his landlord gerbil Frank. After earning money from selling his prized sneakers, Will faces off against an Andalusian horse named Mane Attraction, the lead player for the Lava Coast Magma, by betting the money. Though he has an early lead, Will loses, ends up evicted, and moves in with his friends capybara Daryl and aardwolf Hannah.

The next morning, a video of Will "breaking" Mane's ankles (Note: In basketball (the real-life equivalent of roarball), "breaking ankles" is a slang term which refers to rapid movements from a player which causes a defender to stumble or fall.) goes viral. At work, Will is signed onto the Thorns by Flo. When Jett finds out, she is enraged and mocks Will during a press conference. Will is introduced by proboscis monkey coach Dennis Cooper to the team: Indian rhinoceros Archie Everhardt, giraffe Lenny Williamson, Komodo dragon Modo Olachenko, and ostrich Olivia Burke. Will is placed on the bench for a few games, but when Jett has a technical foul, she is forced to sit out. Will is subbed in and scores a winning point, gaining the Thorns their first win and the respect of his other teammates. While filming a promotional video, Jett is angered and leaves the shoot, but Will comforts her, and takes her to the diner he used to work at. There, Jett sees that the city supports her, and Will reminds Jett of his mother Louise's ambitions for him to play roarball prior to her death. Carol, the owner of the diner, makes Jett promise to bring home the Claw, the roarball championship trophy, for Vineland. That night, Jett goes on a livestream with Mane and defends her team, allowing Dennis to coach them. After this, the Thorns go on a winning streak and make it to the playoffs.

At a party just before the semi-final, Flo tells Jett that she has sold the Thorns to Sunken City to make herself a profit, and that everyone will be cut off and Jett will never win the Claw. Will overhears this, but Jett forces him to keep quiet. The team starts off poorly, however, and in the final quarter, despite Jett's objections, Will tells them what he overheard. The team is upset and shocked, and Jett starts hogging the ball as they resume play. Although the Thorns win, they quit due to Jett's selfishness. Before the finals, Jett apologizes to Will for her actions and tearfully admits her fear of losing her legacy. With his help, the pair gets the team back together and they face off against the Magma at Lava Coast.

During the game, Mane causes Jett to get a possibly career-ending injury on her leg, and she is forced to walk on crutches. When she gets back out on the court, she is applauded and sits on the bench while watching the rest of the team play. During the final quarter, Archie gets an ejection after defending Will from Mane. Jett decides to step back in, and Dennis gives them a new play. Jett distracts the Magma and passes the ball to Will, who makes the winning shot. As they celebrate, Mane's hair gets burned away, while Flo is chased off the field by Archie's twin daughters, Adi and Ari.

Back in Vineland, the Thorns celebrate with the well earned Claw, where Modo reveals that he won ownership of the team in a game of Uno, much to everyone's surprise and allows the Thorns to stay in Vineland.

== Voice cast ==
- Caleb McLaughlin as Will Harris, a teenage American Pygmy goat who dreams of becoming a professional roarball player
  - Luke Cimity as young Will Harris
- Gabrielle Union as Jett Fillmore, a famous all-star black panther roarball player, known as the "Face of the Thorns", who is Will's idol
- Aaron Pierre as Mane Attraction, an arrogant Andalusian horse and member of the Lava Coast Magma team who is the MVP of the league
- Nicola Coughlan as Olivia Burke, an ostrich roarball player and member of the Thorns who is known to bury her head in things after she was posterized by Mane
- David Harbour as Archie Everhardt, an Indian rhinoceros roarball player, enforcer of the Thorns, and the single father of his twin daughters
  - Zul Ariffin voices Archie in the Malaysian theatrical release of the film.
- Nick Kroll as Modo Olachenko, a Russian accented Komodo dragon roarball player with different piercings and member of the Thorns
- Stephen Curry as Lenny Williamson, a giraffe roarball player, aspiring rapper, and member of the Thorns
- Jenifer Lewis as Florence "Flo" Everson, a sleazy warthog and owner of the Vineland Thorns
- Patton Oswalt as Dennis Cooper, a proboscis monkey and the Thorns' coach
- Jelly Roll as Grizz, a brutish grizzly bear roarball player who hogs the "Cage" from Will
- Jennifer Hudson as Louise Harris, Will's late mother and former diner waitress
- Sherry Cola as Hannah, an aardwolf who is Will's friend
- Eduardo Franco as Daryl, a capybara who is Will's friend and Hannah's roommate
- Andrew Santino and Bobby Lee as Chuck and Rusty, a musk ox and egyptian fruit bat duo who are roarball commentators
- Wayne Knight as Frank, a gerbil who is Will's pestering but understanding landlord
- Ayesha Curry as Carol, a llama who is owner of Whisker's Diner in which Will's mother worked
- VanVan as Adi and Ari, Archie's twin daughters
- Rayaan Khan as Theo, a gerbil who is also a good friend of Will and one of Frank's sons
- Adam Pally as Gerald, a nine-banded armadillo and Whisker's Diner patron who stopped cheering for the Thorns until Will started to turn the team around
- Angel Reese as:
  - Propp, a polar bear roarball player for the Shivers
  - Dawson, another polar bear roarball player for the Shivers
- Joe La Puma as Sneaky, a White-headed vulture shoe shop owner that Will tried to pawn some shoes to
- Erin Andrews as a game announcer
- Andre Iguodala as Iggy, a plains zebra roarball referee
- Mike Breen as a Vineland cheetah reporter
- A'ja Wilson as Kouyate, an American alligator roarball player for the Shadows
- Kevin Love as Daskas, a gorilla roarball player for the Shadows
- Dwyane Wade as Rosette, a bull roarball player for the Shadows

== Production ==
=== Development and casting ===
In May 2024, it was announced that Sony Pictures Animation would develop an animated sports film titled Goat, with Tyree Dillihay directing and Adam Rosette co-directing, while Stephen Curry and Erick Peyton would produce under their Unanimous Media company alongside Michelle Raimo Kouyate and Modern Magic's Adam Rosenberg and Rodney Rothman. Rick Mischel and Fonda Snyder served as executive producers, with David Schulenburg co-producing. The film had been in the works by 2019. Aaron Buchsbaum and Teddy Riley received screenplay credit, while Nicolas Curcio and Peter Chiarelli received story credit. MACRO co-funded the film.

In June 2025, during the Annecy International Animation Film Festival, it was announced that Curry, Caleb McLaughlin, Gabrielle Union, Nick Kroll, Nicola Coughlan, David Harbour, Jenifer Lewis, and Patton Oswalt were part of the cast. The following month, Jennifer Hudson, Aaron Pierre, Jelly Roll, Ayesha Curry, Andrew Santino, Bobby Lee, Sherry Cola and Eduardo Franco were added to the cast.

=== Animation and design ===
The film's animation was done by Sony Pictures Imageworks, using animation techniques also used in KPop Demon Hunters and Spider-Man: Into the Spider-Verse. Like their previous films, the film uses a new artstyle of animation that's both graphic and more in the vein of street art graffiti. The team logos for the film were designed by graphic fan designer Emily Morgan who took over 500 hours through 600 rough drafts in over 7 color palettes. To design the impact frames of the film, artists used graphic sports cards to add more flair into the characters. For the costumes of the animals, designer Dominique Dawson focuses on their anatomy and build off the personalities of the teams. Production Designer, Jang Lee, explained that key inspirations for the visuals and aesthetics were Do the Right Thing, City of God, and The Jungle Book.

== Music ==
Kris Bowers composed the film's score. The film's soundtrack was released via Mercury Records on February 13, 2026. The film's original score was released via Sony Classical the same day.

== Release ==
=== Theatrical ===
Goat had its world premiere at Los Angeles on February 6, 2026, had an early access screening on February 7, 2026, and was released in the United States on February 13, 2026, coinciding with the 2026 NBA All-Star Game, which took place in Los Angeles that weekend.

=== Home media ===
Goat was released on digital platforms via premium video on demand on March 24, 2026 and was released on Ultra HD Blu-ray, Blu-ray, and DVD by Sony Pictures Home Entertainment on May 5, 2026.

== Reception ==
=== Box office ===
Goat grossed $103 million in the United States and Canada, and $92 million in other territories, for a worldwide total of $195 million.

In the United States and Canada, Goat was released alongside Wuthering Heights, Good Luck, Have Fun, Don't Die, and Crime 101, and was projected to gross $20–25 million from 3,700 theaters in its four-day opening weekend. The film grossed $7.1 million on its opening day. It ended up debuting to $35 million domestic, finishing second behind Wuthering Heights. Nevertheless, it marked the biggest opening weekend for an original animated film since Elemental in 2023. In its second weekend, Goat finished first with $17.2 million, dethroning Wuthering Heights. The film then made $12 million in its third weekend, finishing in second place to Scream 7.

=== Critical response ===
On the review aggregator website Rotten Tomatoes, 83% of 91 critics' reviews are positive, with an average rating of 6.4/10. The website's consensus reads: "Sporting a terrific voice cast, nifty animation, and a solid moral for youngsters, GOAT plays a familiar game with enough style and finesse to come close to the greats." Metacritic, which uses a weighted average, assigned the film a score of 60 out of 100, based on 16 critics, indicating "mixed or average" reviews. Audiences polled by CinemaScore gave the film an average grade of "A" on an A+ to F scale.

Mark Kennedy from the Associated Press praised its visuals while simultaneously criticizing its writing as "lazy, thin" and "tiresome in its overly familiar redemption arc". Brandon Yu from the New York Times wrote, "it's a story with few surprises and mostly rudimentary emotional concepts, but is enlivened by artwork with colorful texture and a dynamic animation style." Eric Goldman of IGN gave it a more favorable review, writing, "where Goat truly shines and stands out is in its animation" and "has a lot of fun with the idea that these characters truly are animals".

John Nugent of Empire gave it a 2 out of 5 rating, saying, "Lovely visuals, but this is a rare miss from Sony Pictures Animation. Watch KPop Demon Hunters again, instead." Owen Gleiberman of Variety called it "a vibrant surprise. It's a highly original and rousing animated feature -- a sports fable with a hip-hop vibe and an off-kilter cosmology."

Cath Clarke of The Guardian panned the film as "loud, chaotic, and unlovable," likening its "algorithmically generated" feel to "AI slop" and concluding that the "underdog plot" ultimately "lacks heart and soul." Nell Minow of RogerEbert.com found its "underdog" narrative and character designs to be "generic," yet she offered a more favorable review, praising the "vibrant" artwork and "immersive and entrancing" world-building as being "more imaginative than the characters and story."

Frank Scheck of The Hollywood Reporter gave the film a mixed review, calling it "better-looking than it is written" while praising its "wildly imaginative visuals" and strong voice cast despite a predictable plot and "relentless" pacing. William Bibbiani of TheWrap gave it a more favorable review, calling it "visually stimulating" and a "genuinely well-told" story that succeeds as a "wholesome" and "subtly progressive" family film. Pete Hammond of Deadline also lauded the film as an "imaginative and game-changing winner," specifically praising the "visually stunning" animation and a script "full of wit and heart" that successfully "rewrites the rules" for the genre.

== See also ==
- List of basketball films
