= Andrew Santino =

American comedian (born 1983)

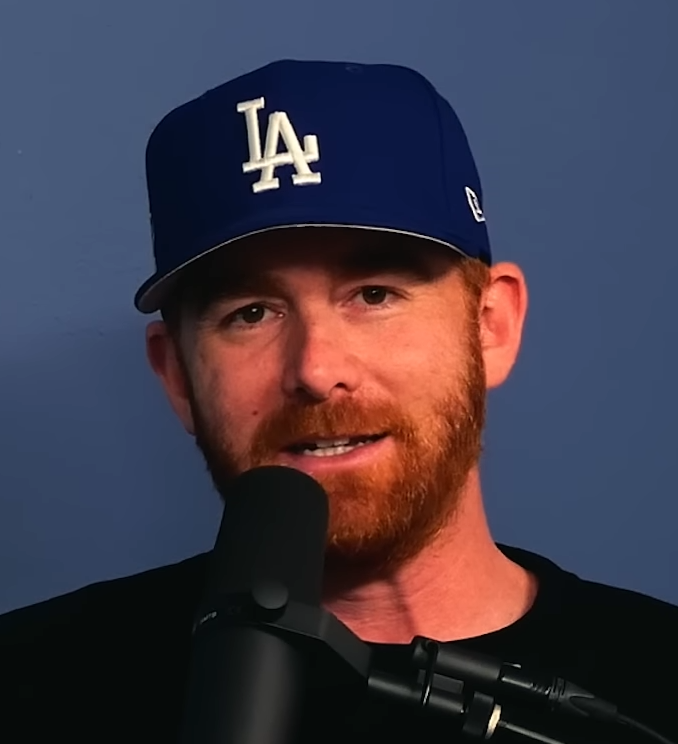
- Santino in 2024
- Born: Andrew James Santino; October 16, 1983 (age 43); Chicago, Illinois, U.S.
- Other names: Slugger Santino, Cheeto Dust Cultivator, Cheeto Santino, The Last of the Great Gingers
- Education: Arizona State University

Comedy career
- Years active: 2006–present
- Medium: Stand-up comedy, film, television, podcasting
- Genres: Observational comedy, blue comedy, insult comedy, satire, sarcasm
- Subjects: Current events, dating, gender, marriage, politics, political correctness, race relations, religion, self-deprecation, sports
- Website: andrewsantino.com

Andrew James Santino (born October 16, 1983) is an American stand-up comedian and actor. He is known for his appearances in television series and films such as Sin City Saints, The Disaster Artist, Mixology, I'm Dying Up Here, Beef, and Dave. Santino is also known for being the star of a YouTube web series called Duncan Rocks.

== Early life and education ==
Santino grew up in the River North neighborhood of Chicago, and he is of half Italian and half Irish descent. Raised by a single mother, he graduated from Naperville North High School in 2002, and then attended Arizona State University.

== Career ==
On the series I'm Dying Up Here, Santino played Bill Hobbs, a talented, popular comedian who sabotages himself with a bitter attitude and negative outlook on life. From 2020 to 2023, Santino starred in the series Dave, which tells the fictionalized story of rapper Lil Dicky; Santino portrayed his roommate and manager. In 2017, he released a Showtime special called Home Field Advantage. He played a recurring character in the NBC drama This Is Us, as a producer of the fictional sitcom The Manny.

Santino produces and hosts the podcast Whiskey Ginger, where he interviews friends in the entertainment industry as they reflect on their past while sipping whiskey. In 2020, Santino began co-hosting the Bad Friends podcast with fellow comedian Bobby Lee.

Santino hosts golf content on a YouTube series called No Bad Lies. In August 2025, Santino participated in the inaugural Internet Invitational organized by Barstool Sports and Bob Does Sports.

In 2025, Santino participated in the Riyadh Comedy Festival. Joey Shea, Saudi Arabia researcher at Human Rights Watch, said in a statement that the Saudi government is using the comedy festival to whitewash its human rights abuses.

In 2026, Santino partnered with Bobby Lee on a 10-episode, unscripted comedy series, The Bad Game Show, produced by All Things Comedy. The game show will involve celebrities completing absurd, chaotic challenges in Lee's mother's basement.

== Filmography ==
=== Film ===
Year	Title	Role	Notes
2008	Henry Poole Is Here	Hospital Orderly	
2010	Santa's Xmas Party	Andrew	Short film; also writer and executive producer
2012	Funny Girl	Himself	Short film
2013	Dance Crew	Def Leo Pard	Short film
2014	Warren	Rob Brown	
2016	Dean	Chad	
2016	SXSW Comedy with Natasha Leggero	Himself	
2017	Show Business	Doctor	Short film
2017	The Disaster Artist	Scott Holmes / 'Mike'	
2018	Little Bitches	Trent	
2018	Game Over, Man!	Officer Hank	
2020	Friendsgiving	Rick	
2022	Me Time	Alan Geller	
2023	House Party	Peter	
2023	Fool's Paradise	Comedian	
2023	Scrambled	Jesse Robinson	
2024	Ricky Stanicky	JT	
2025	Happy Gilmore 2	Himself	Cameo
2025	Now You See Me: Now You Don't	Brett Finnegan	
2026	Goat	Chuck	
TBA	Me Time 2	TBA	Filming

=== Stand-up specials ===
Year	Title	Platform
2018	Home Field Advantage	Amazon Prime
2023	Cheeseburger	Netflix
2025	White Noise	Hulu

=== Television ===
Year	Title	Role	Notes
2009–10	Crafty	Eli / Craft Service	Series regular (8 episodes)
2010	Big on the Web	Himself (host)	Unknown episode(s)
2010	The Surf Report	Himself (host)	Unknown episode(s)
2012	Punk'd	Field Agent	Recurring role (12 episodes); Segment producer (5 episodes)
2012	The Office	Ship Sales Transport Captain	Episode: "The Boat"
2013	Arrested Development	Employer	Episode: "The B. Team"
2013	Family Tree	Confederate Soldier	Episode: "Civil War"
2013	Children's Hospital	Jasper 'Pants'	Episode: "Imaginary Friends"
2013	Adam Devine's House Party	Himself	Episode: "Ex-Girlfriend"
2013	Who Gets the Last Laugh?	—N/a	Field producer Episode: "Kunal Nayyar / Bill Bellamy / Jeff Dye"
2014	Deadbeat	Sports Commentator	Episode: "The Hot God Contest"
2014	Mixology	Bruce	Series regular (13 episodes)
2014	The League	Shapps	Episode: "EBDBBnB"
2014	How I Met Your Dad	Danny	Unaired CBS/FOX pilot
2014	Last Call with Carson Daly	Himself (guest)	Episode: "J.B. / Andrew Santino / Warm Soda"
2015	Sin City Saints	Jake Tulius	Series regular (8 episodes)
2015	The Sixth Lead	Tow Truck Operator	Episode: "Trouble at the Security Gate"
2015	Conan	Himself (comic guest)	Episode: "Edward Norton / Melissa Rauch / Andrew Santino"
2015	Roast of Justin Bieber Pre-Show	Himself (host)	TV special
2015	The Meltdown with Jonah and Kumail	Himself (guest)	Episode: "The One with All the Spitting"
2015	The Half Hour	Himself (comedian)	Episode: "Must CC: The Half Hour"
2016	American Dad!	Jaramillo Henchman (voice role)	Episode: "Fight and Flight"
2016–17	Here's the Rub	Nikola Popov	Series regular, executive producer (12 episodes)
2016–22	This Is Us	Casey	3 episodes
2017	The Late Late Show with James Corden	Himself (guest)	Episode: "Jim Carrey / Al Madrigal / Andrew Santino / Erik Griffin"
2017–18	I'm Dying Up Here	Billy Hobbs	Series regular (20 episodes)
2018	Alone Together	Kyle	Episode: "Nurse Esther"
2019	Fam	Spence	Episode: "Party Girl"
2019–20	Lights Out with David Spade	Himself (panelist)	3 episodes
2020	Curb Your Enthusiasm	Plumber	Episode: "Insufficient Praise"
2020–23	Dave	Mike	Series regular (30 episodes)
2021–23	Ten Year Old Tom	Various voices	5 episodes
2021	Fairfax	Biff (voice)	Episode: "Dale Hates His Dad"
2023–present	Royal Crackers	Theodore "Theo" Hornsby Jr. (voice)	Main role
2023	Beef	Michael	Recurring role
2024	Dinner Time Live with David Chang	Himself (guest)	Episode: "Choose Your Own Adventure Volume 2"
2025	Last Meals	Himself (guest)	Episode: "Andrew Santino Eats His Last Meal"
