= What Would Diplo Do? =

- Genre: Comedy
- Created by: Brandon Dermer; James Van Der Beek
- Starring: James Van Der Beek; Dillon Francis; Dora Madison Burge; Jamar Malachi Neighbors; Bobby Lee; H. Michael Croner
- Country of origin: United States
- Original language: English
- No. of seasons: 1
- No. of episodes: 5

Production
- Executive producers: Todd Lubin; Jack Turner; Brandon Dermer; Diplo; Kevin Kusatsu; Hal Ozsan; James Van Der Beek
- Producer: Mark DiCristofaro
- Running time: 22 minutes
- Production company: Matador Content

Original release
- Network: Viceland
- Release: August 3 – August 31, 2017

What Would Diplo Do? is an American comedy television series created by Brandon Dermer and James Van Der Beek. The series stars James Van Der Beek, Dillon Francis, Dora Madison Burge, Jamar Malachi Neighbors, Bobby Lee and H. Michael Croner. The series premiered on Viceland on August 3, 2017.

== Plot ==
Wesley "Diplo" Pentz is a dim-witted but good-natured DJ, producer, and record label head. The series follows Diplo as he performs, records, and lives life, often making mistakes by accident (such as spending the day with the wrong sick child) or on purpose (such as starting a Twitter beef with Calvin Harris).

== Cast ==
- James Van Der Beek as Wesley "Wes" Pentz/"Diplo", a DJ and producer who runs the Mad Decent record label
- Dillon Francis as Jasper, Diplo's overeager and drug-loving friend since middle school
- Dora Madison Burge as Karen, Diplo's overworked personal assistant
- Tom Stourton as Calvin Harris
- Brandon Wardell as Sonny Moore/"Skrillex", a DJ and producer who runs the OWSLA record label
- Jamar Malachi Neighbors as Jamar, Diplo's social media manager
- Bobby Lee as Brian, Diplo's road manager
- H. Michael Croner as Kröner, Diplo's German assistant

== Episodes ==
No.	Title	Directed by	Written by	Original release date	Prod. code	US viewers (millions)
1	"The Beef"	Brandon Dermer	James Van Der Beek	August 3, 2017	101	0.059
Diplo gets into a Twitter fight with Calvin Harris while spending the day with a sick boy...or so he thinks.
2	"The Cult"	Brandon Dermer	James Van Der Beek	August 10, 2017	102	0.033
3	"The Curse"	Brandon Dermer	James Van Der Beek	August 17, 2017	103	0.092
4	"Ur Game Ain't Shit"	Brandon Dermer	James Van Der Beek	August 24, 2017	104	0.039
5	"Screwged"	Brandon Dermer	James Van Der Beek	August 31, 2017	105	0.053

== Reception ==
On Rotten Tomatoes, the series has an aggregate score of 90% based on 9 positive and 1 negative critic reviews. The website's consensus reads: "James Van Der Beek excels with a vanity-free performance in What Would Diplo Do?, a sardonic takedown of DJ culture that is as observant as it is uncomfortably funny."
