= Jamar Malachi Neighbors =

American actor and comedian (born 1986)

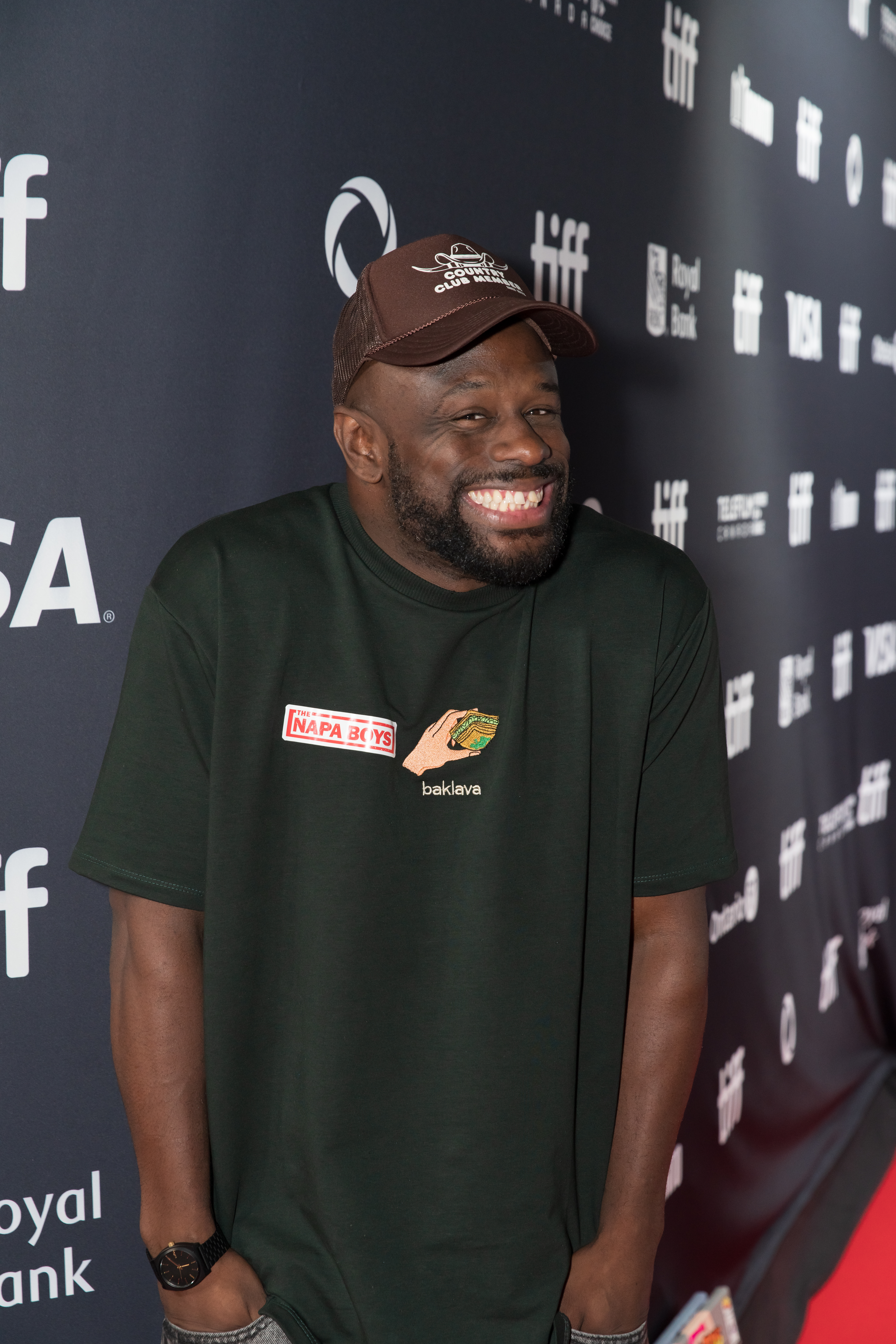
- Jamar Malachi 2025
- Born: January 25, 1986 (age 40); Compton, California, U.S.
- Occupations: Actor and comedian
- Years active: 2010–present

Jamar Malachi Neighbors (born January 25, 1986) is an American actor and comedian. He is known for his stand-up comedy and roles in Keanu and What Would Diplo Do?.

Neighbors was born and raised in Compton, California. As a child, he was inspired by Martin Lawrence on Def Comedy Jam.

== Discography ==
Year	Title
2016	"AmeriKKKa’s Nigga"
2014	"Naked"

== Filmography ==
=== Film ===
Year	Title	Role	Notes
2011	Underbelly Blues	Uforic	
2014	Word Police	Comedian	Short film
2016	Keanu	Stitches	
2018	An L.A. Minute	Blind Mugger	
2023	House Party	Security Guard	
2025	The Napa Boys	Stiffler's Brother	

=== Television ===
Year	Title	Role	Notes
2010	Minority Report	Reporter	
2013	Creepy Caress	Jamar	
2015	Lucas Bros Moving Co	Jay Z	
2016	The Carmichael Show	Jamar	
2016	Mind Jack		
2016	Court Ordered	Ichabod	
2016-2017	Jeff Ross Presents Roast Battle	as part of the Wave Comedy Troupe	
2017	Crashing	as part of the Wave Comedy Troupe	
2017	What Would Diplo Do?	Jamar	
2018	Jeff Ross Presents Roast Battle	Himself	
2019	Black Jesus	Ambro	
2020	Black Monday	Jamar	
2022	This Fool	Chef Percy Williams	
2023	Royal Crackers	Moey D.	
