= Who Gets the Last Laugh? (TV series) =

American television series

- Genre: Sketch comedy; Improv; Hidden camera
- Presented by: Donald Faison
- Country of origin: United States
- Original language: English
- No. of seasons: 1
- No. of episodes: 9

Production
- Executive producers: Ashton Kutcher; Jason Goldberg
- Running time: 20 to 22 minutes
- Production companies: Katalyst Films; Warner Horizon Television

Original release
- Network: TBS
- Release: April 16 – June 11, 2013

Who Gets the Last Laugh? is an American hidden camera comedy television series that debuted April 16, 2013, on TBS. The series pits some of the industries most well-known comedians vs. comedy actors against one another to see who can pull the most outrageous practical jokes.

== Premise ==
Three guest comedians must dream the funniest and most outrageous pranks possible, then successfully unleash their ideas on an unsuspecting public. A live audience then determines which comedy star really got the "last laugh", with the winner earning $10,000 to be given to the charity of their choice.

== Episodes ==
No.	Comedians	Original release date	US viewers (millions)
1	"Kunal Nayyar vs. Bill Bellamy vs. Jeff Dye"	April 16, 2013	1.52
2	"D. L. Hughley vs. Danny Masterson vs. Cheri Oteri"	April 23, 2013	1.74
3	"Aries Spears vs. Natasha Leggero vs. Andy Dick"	April 30, 2013	1.18
4	"Charlie Murphy vs. Owen Benjamin vs. Chris Kattan"	May 7, 2013	1.13
5	"Finesse Mitchell vs. Luenell vs. Alan Thicke"	May 14, 2013	1.18
6	"Nicole Sullivan vs. Kevin McDonald vs. Larry Joe Campbell"	May 21, 2013	1.22
7	"Iliza Shlesinger vs. Tom Green vs. Derek Miller"	May 28, 2013	1.30
8	"Bam Margera vs. Bobby Lee vs. Matt Besser"	June 4, 2013	1.30
9	"Gregg "Opie" Hughes vs. Russell Peters vs. Paul Rodriguez"	June 11, 2013	1.34

== See also ==
- List of practical joke topics
