= Jeff Ross Presents Roast Battle =

2016 American TV series

- Genre: Roast comedy Insult comedy
- Created by: Brian Moses; Rell Battle; Jeffrey Ross
- Directed by: Joel Gallen
- Presented by: Jeff Ross
- Starring: Jeff Ross; Brian Moses
- Country of origin: United States
- Original language: English
- No. of seasons: 3
- No. of episodes: 19

Production
- Executive producers: Brian Moses; Rell Battle; Jeffrey Ross; Amy Zvi; Willie Mercer; Rick Austin; Joel Gallen
- Editors: Timothy Schultz; Pi Ware
- Camera setup: Multi-camera

Original release
- Network: Comedy Central
- Release: July 27, 2016 – August 28, 2018

Related
- Comedy Central Roasts; Roast Battle

Jeff Ross Presents Roast Battle is an American roast comedy competition television series that was broadcast on Comedy Central from July 27, 2016 to August 28, 2018.

Hosted by Jeff Ross, the show consisted of one on one roast battles during which the comedians would insult each other comedically. The winners of each battle were decided by a panel of guest judges that consisted of fellow comedians and other celebrities. Comedian Brian Moses served as the announcer and referee.

== History ==
The television series is based on a live show that runs at The Comedy Store in Los Angeles in the comedy club's Belly Room. The live show originated from a heated argument that occurred in The Comedy Store's parking lot in 2013 between two comedians over a stolen joke. The argument was about to devolve into a physical fight and comedian Brian Moses–who was hosting an open mic night the following night–suggested that the two comedians could fight it out verbally on stage. Two other comedians volunteered to judge the event. From there Moses and fellow comedian Rell Battle started the live Roast Battle comedy show.

Moses and Battle eventually parted ways. Moses continued the show in the Belly Room and his shows were sometimes credited as "Jeffrey Ross Presents". Moses also brought the show to The Stand comedy club in New York City under the title Brian Moses and Jeff Ross Present Roastmasters. Both the LA and NYC roast battle shows held bracket-style tournaments to determine the top regional roaster for each city, then the top LA and NYC roasters would compete for the title of Roastmaster, which included a championship belt similar to those awarded in professional combat sports.

The Roastmasters show in NYC was emceed by comedian Luis J. Gomez and audio recordings were posted to a podcast feed under the Roastmasters name. The NYC show dissolved in 2018. Moses also broadcast audio recordings of the LA show as a podcast titled Verbal Violence. The show gained in popularity and Ross was able to recruit friends like Dave Chappelle and Sarah Silverman to serve as guest judges during the show.

Since 2014 Ross has been adviser and lead judge of Roast Battle In 2015 Ross brought the live show to the Just For Laughs comedy festival in Montreal where it caught the attention of Jonas Larsen, a senior vice president at Comedy Central. The first episode of Jeff Ross Presents Roast Battle aired on the network in 2016. In 2018 the Verbal Violence podcast's name was changed to Roast Battle and the podcast was moved to Comedy Central’s Global Podcast Network.

== Format ==
The show is hosted by Jeff Ross who also serves as one of the judges on each show. Comedian and show co-creator Brian Moses announces each competitor and also serves as referee. The winners of each battle are determined by a panel of guest judges that include two or more comedians or other celebrities. There are three rules to the competition: The competitors must use only original material, no physical contact is allowed and the battle always ends with a hug.

In the first two season there were regional events filmed at various comedy clubs across the United States in search of some or all of the sixteen contestants to compete in the main eight battle competition via a bracket-style tournament. In the first season the regionals were held in Los Angeles, Austin, Chicago and New York City. The final eight battles were filmed at the 2016 Just for Laughs festival in Montreal and the very final battle was broadcast live on Comedy Central.

In the second season the regionals were held at the Comedy Cellar in New York City, Comedy Works in Denver, Colorado, the Laughing Skull Lounge in Atlanta, Georgia and the Los Angeles Comedy Store. In addition, there were comedians added to the final sixteen competitors list who did not compete in the regionals. The final eight battles of the second season were filmed on the Sunset Strip and the final battle was also broadcast live.

The show changed it format in the third season and abandoned the bracket-style tournament. As a result there were no preliminary regional battles and instead each episode featured only two battles per episode over six episodes. In addition Anthony Jeselnik and Nikki Glaser served as judges on all six episodes and they were also joined by Pete Davidson during the final episode. The final episode also marked the first time that Ross took to the stage as a battler during the show; he battled with NBA player Blake Griffin.

== International versions ==
The popularity of Jeff Ross Presents Roast Battle has led to the launch of roast battle shows on some of Comedy Central's sister stations outside of the United States:

- Comedy Central’s Roast Battle South Africa launched in 2017 on Comedy Central Africa and was renewed for a second season in 2018.
- Roast Battle was launched in 2018 on Comedy Central (UK & Ireland). The show is hosted by former Jeff Ross Presents Roast Battle contestant Jimmy Carr.
- Duelo des Comediantes was launched on Comedy Central Latinoamérica in 2018.
- Two versions have been produced in Canada, the English-language Roast Battle Canada for CTV Comedy Channel and the French-language Roast Battle: Le Grand Duel for Z.

== Broadcasts ==
Series	Start date	End date	Episodes
1	July 27, 2016	July 31, 2016	5
2	January 1, 2017	January 29, 2017	8
3	July 29, 2018	August 28, 2018	6

== Episodes ==
=== Series 1 ===
The winner of each roast battle is in bold.

Episode	Episode Title	First broadcast	Judges	Battles	Notes
1.1	Road to Roast Battle	July 27, 2016	Various (see notes)	Various (see notes)	This was an introductory episode featuring clips from the preliminary battles that were held in Los Angeles, Austin, Chicago and New York City.
1.2	Night One	July 28, 2016	David Spade, Kevin Hart	**Sarah Tiana** vs. Chris Cubas; **Sam Morril** vs. Steve Rannazzisi; Tom Ballard vs. **Earl Skakel**; **Jimmy Carr** vs. Christi Chiello	
1.3	Night Two	July 29, 2016	Whoopi Goldberg, Anthony Jeselnik	**Mike Lawrence**; Matthew Broussard; **Ralphie May** vs. Ms. Pat; Mark Normand vs. **Tony Hinchcliffe**; Olivia Grace vs. **K. Trevor Wilson**	
1.4	Night Three	July 30, 2016	Seth Rogen, Jimmy Kimmel	**Mike Lawrence** vs. Ralphie May; **Earl Skakel** vs. Jimmy Carr; **Sarah Tiana** vs. Sam Morril; Tony Hinchcliffe vs. K. **Trevor Wilson**	
1.5	Night Four: Live Finals	July 31, 2016	Sarah Silverman, Judd Apatow	Semifinals: **Sarah Tiana** vs. Earl Skakel; K. Trevor Wilson vs. **Mike Lawrence**	The final round was broadcast live on Comedy Central
1.5	Night Four: Live Finals	July 31, 2016	Sarah Silverman, Judd Apatow	Finals: **Mike Lawrence** vs. Sarah Tiana	The final round was broadcast live on Comedy Central

=== Series 2 ===
The winner of each roast battle is in bold.

Episode	Episode Title	First broadcast	Judges	Battles	Notes
2.1	New York Regional	January 1, 2017	Lisa Lampanelli, Jay Pharoah, Jim Norton, Mike Lawrence	Eli Sairs vs. **Scott Chaplain**; J.P. McDade vs. **Yamaneika Saunders**; Evan Williams vs. **Zac Amico***; **Dina Hashem** vs. Aaron Berg**	Filmed at the Comedy Cellar in New York City; *Both contestants advanced to final sixteen. **Neither contestant advanced to the final sixteen.
2.2	Denver and Atlanta Regionals	January 8, 2017	Denver: Russell Peters, Moshe Kasher	Denver: Justine Marino vs. **Sam Tallent**; Karlous Miller vs. **Jay Light***; CJ Sullivan vs. **Nate Craig**; **Bri Pruett** vs. Erin Ingle; **Noah Gardenswartz** vs. Clayton English; **Nicole Aimée Schreiber** vs. Andy Haynes	Filmed at Comedy Works in Denver, Colorado. *The only contestant to advance to the final sixteen from this episode was Jay Light.
2.2	Denver and Atlanta Regionals	January 8, 2017	Atlanta: Lil Rel Howery, Josh McDermitt, Fortune Feimster	Atlanta: Kath Barbadoro vs. **Kim Congdon***; **Candice Thompson** vs. Jasmin Leigh**; Erik Bergstrom vs. Jacob Williams (tie)***; **Megan Gailey** vs. Sean White****	Filmed at the Laughing Skull Lounge in Atlanta, Georgia. *Neither contestant advanced to the final sixteen. **Neither contestant advanced to the final sixteen. ***Neither contestant advanced to the final sixteen. ****Neither contestant advanced to the final sixteen.
2.3	LA Regionals: Part 1	January 15, 2017	Chris D'Elia, Sebastian Maniscalco, Ron Artest	**Alex Hooper** vs. Joe Dosch*; **Toby Muresianu** vs. Omid Singh**; Greg Roque vs. **Frank Castillo**; Anna Valenzuela vs. **Keith Carey*****	Filmed at The Comedy Store in Los Angeles. *Both contestants advanced to the final sixteen. **Neither contestant advanced to the final sixteen. ***Both contestants advanced to the final sixteen.
2.4	LA Regionals: Part 2	January 22, 2017	Chris D'Elia, Sebastian Maniscalco, Ron Artest	**Jamar Neighbors** vs. Guy Branum*; Robin Tran vs. **Pat Barker****; **Leah Kayajanian** vs. Connor McSpadden***	Filmed at The Comedy Store in Los Angeles. *Neither contestant advanced to the final sixteen. **Neither contestant advanced to the final sixteen. ***Neither contestant advanced to the final sixteen.
2.5	Night One	January 26, 2017	Anthony Jeselnik, Snoop Dogg	Kurt Metzger vs. **Yamaneika Saunders**; **Joe Dosch** vs. Leah Kayajanian; Evan Williams vs. **Anna Valenzuela**; Jay Light vs. **Frank Castillo**	Filmed in Los Angeles on the Sunset Strip
2.6	Night Two	January 27, 2017	Whitney Cummings, Ken Jeong	**Todd Barry** vs. Jessica Kirson; Keith Carey vs. **Olivia Grace**; Scott Chaplain vs. **Alex Hooper**; **Matthew Broussard** vs. Zac Amico	Filmed in Los Angeles on the Sunset Strip
2.7	Night Three	January 28, 2017	Sarah Silverman, John Mayer	**Joe Dosch** vs. Yamaneika Saunders; Anna Valenzuela vs. **Frank Castillo**; Olivia Grace vs. **Todd Barry**; Alex Hooper vs. **Matthew Broussard**	Filmed in Los Angeles on the Sunset Strip
2.8	Night Four	January 29, 2017	Patton Oswalt, T.J. Miller, Jason Sudeikis, Natasha Leggero	Semifinals: Joe Dosch vs. **Frank Castillo**; Todd Barry vs. **Matthew Broussard**	Filmed in Los Angeles on the Sunset Strip
2.8	Night Four	January 29, 2017	Patton Oswalt, T.J. Miller, Jason Sudeikis, Natasha Leggero	Finals: **Frank Castillo** vs. Matthew Broussard	Filmed in Los Angeles on the Sunset Strip

=== Series 3 ===
Episode	Episode Title	First broadcast	Judges	Battles	Notes
3.1	Sarah Tiana vs. Dolph Ziggler	July 29, 2018	Anthony Jeselnik, Nikki Glaser	Todd Barry vs. Brendon Walsh; Sarah Tiana vs. Dolph Ziggler	
3.2	Yamaneika Saunders vs. Jamar Neighbors	July 31, 2018	Anthony Jeselnik, Nikki Glaser	Alex Duong vs. Robin Tran; Yamaneika Saunders vs. Jamar Neighbors	
3.3	Randy Sklar vs. Jason Sklar	August 7, 2018	Anthony Jeselnik, Nikki Glaser	Randy Sklar vs. Jason Sklar; Joe List vs. Sarah Tollemache	
3.4	Sam Morril vs. Joe Machi	August 14, 2018	Anthony Jeselnik, Nikki Glaser	Kim Congdon vs. Olivia Grace; Sam Morril vs. Joe Machi	
3.5	Mike Lawrence vs. Tony Hinchcliffe	August 21, 2018	Anthony Jeselnik, Nikki Glaser	Mike Lawrence vs. Tony Hinchcliffe; Matthew Broussard vs. Jerron Horton	
3.6	Blake Griffin vs. Jeff Ross	August 28, 2018	Anthony Jeselnik, Nikki Glaser, Pete Davidson	Blake Griffin vs. Jeff Ross; Kurt Metzger vs. Mark Normand	
