= Five Towns College =

College in New York founded 1972

Coordinates: 40°47′41″N 73°22′09″W

- Other name: the Sound
- Motto: Focus, Thrive, Create
- Type: Private college
- Established: 1972
- President: David M. Cohen
- Faculty: 20 FT/ 124 PT (2023)
- Students: 723
- Undergraduates: 662 (2023)
- Postgraduates: 61 (2023)
- Location: Dix Hills, New York, U.S.
- Campus: Suburban, 35 acres (14 ha)
- Colors: Maroon and white
- Mascot: Fader the Seagull
- Website: www.ftc.edu

Five Towns College is a private college in Dix Hills, New York. The college's degree programs focus on music, media, and the performing arts.

== History ==
Founded in 1972, Five Towns College holds an Absolute Charter issued by the New York State Board of Regents. The college's name comes from the original proposed campus, which was to be in Lawrence in southwestern Nassau County, New York, an area known as "The Five Towns". However, the college never opened in that location. Its first campus was in Merrick, New York (1973–1982). Its second campus was in Seaford, New York (1982–1992). The college acquired its permanent home in Dix Hills in 1992 and relocated there for the fall 1992 semester.

== Academics ==
The college offers associate, bachelor, master's and doctoral degree programs through eight academic divisions. These include music performance, theatre arts, mass communications, film and television, business management, liberal arts, interactive media arts, and music teacher education. Popular majors include audio recording technology, broadcasting, musical theatre, music performance, and business administration and management.

It was the first in New York State to offer programs focusing on jazz and commercial music, audio recording technology, and music business.

Its programs of study are registered by the New York State Education Department. The college is institutionally accredited by the Middle States Commission on Higher Education. It also holds programmatic accreditation by the National Council for Accreditation of Teacher Education and by the National Association of Schools of Music.

Five Towns' Lorraine Kleinman and Stanley G. Cohen Memorial Library/Learning Resource Center offers digital and bound collections of material to support its academic programs. The library also includes an Educational Technology Center for the training and development of online learning skills for students and faculty.

== Student life ==
Approximately one-third of Five Towns College students reside on-campus in the college's Living/Learning Center - a complex of four residence halls with private bathrooms, student center and music practice rooms.

The college is also home to the John Lennon Center for Music and Technology, which contains sound recording studios, a film sound stage, an interactive computer graphics lab, and a student-run radio station. The college is also equipped with a MIDI studio, film editing lab, and piano/keyboard lab.

The school's main stage, the Five Towns College Performing Arts Center, consists of a fully rigged stage with seating for 486. The college also includes a smaller performance studio, costume shop, and set design and construction workshop.

The college offers academic and financial support services such as counseling, academic advising, tutoring, and the provision of accommodations for students with documented learning disabilities through its Student Success Center. In addition, Five Towns College offers the only Higher Education Opportunity Program (HEOP) on Long Island, which provides additional support services for students who are designated as both academically and economically disadvantaged by the New York State Education Department.

=== Athletics ===
The Five Towns College Sound Athletic Department is a member of the United States Collegiate Athletic Association and competes as a full member of the Hudson Valley Intercollegiate Athletic Conference. The college's mascot is Fader the Seagull.

The college offers men's and women's basketball, volleyball, and soccer. In 2021, it began to offer competition in esports and cross country. In 2022, the department announced that it would offer men's and women's lacrosse.

Home games are broadcast from Studio 400, the college's television lab.

=== Media ===
Five Towns College annually hosts the Long Island Media Arts Show.

Scripted video productions are produced through the college's Film/Television Center.

The college operates a broadcast transmission facility for its FCC-licensed radio station at Riverhead, NY under the call sign WFTU. The station broadcasts at 1570 AM and streams over the Internet. On May 16, 2018, Five Towns obtained a construction permit from the FCC for a broadcast translator in order to begin FM broadcast operations at the frequency 104.9. Though the translator has been licensed, WFTU has yet to begin public FM transmission.

== Notable alumni ==
- Nicole Albino of Nina Sky
- Jon Bellion, songwriter and producer
- Maurice "Bugs" Bower, songwriter and record producer
- Jesse Carmichael, keyboardist and guitarist of Maroon 5
- Julian Casablancas, lead singer of The Strokes
- Jared Cotter, songwriter and television personality
- Kota the Friend, rapper and singer-songwriter
- Frankie J. Galasso, actor and musician best known as a member of the boy band Dream Street.
- Wyclef Jean, rapper and producer of The Fugees
- Ken Kelsch (1947–2023), cinematographer (faculty)
- Adam Levine, lead singer of Maroon 5
- Olivia Longott, R&B singer
- Charles Mack, Oscar-nominated writer of Raise It Up (August Rush song)
- Chrisette Michele, recording artist
- Christian Nilsson, filmmaker best known for Westhampton (2025) and Dashcam (2021)
- Joe Satriani, rock guitarist with 15 Grammy nominations
- Earnest Woodall, composer and guitarist
