= Obscured Releasing =

Film distributor based in New York City

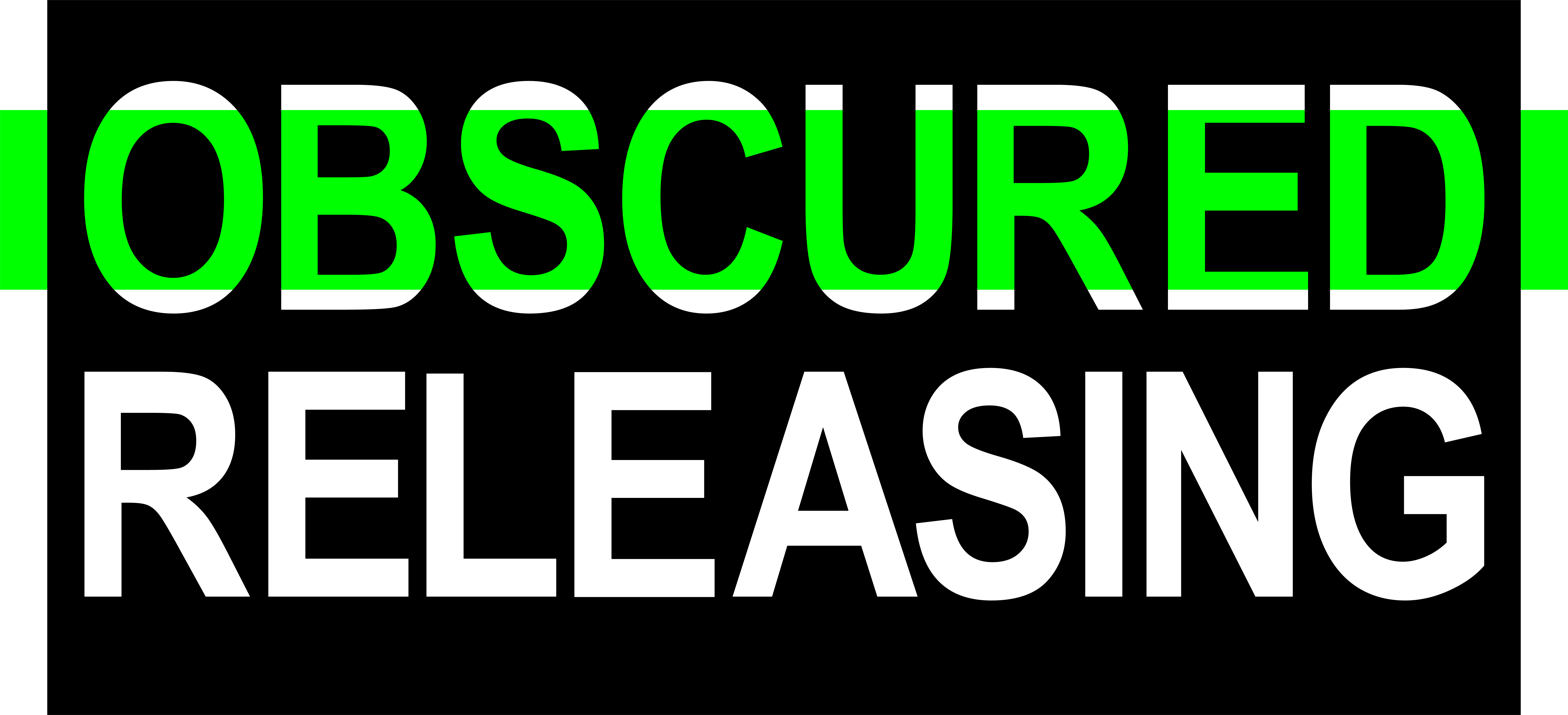
- Type: Private
- Industry: Film industry
- Founded: 2025
- Founder: RJ Millard, Bill Guentzler
- Headquarters: New York City, New York, U.S.
- Website: www.obscuredreleasing.com

Obscured Releasing is an American film distribution company founded in 2025 by RJ Millard and Bill Guentzler. The company has distributed Stop the Insanity: Finding Susan Powter (2025), Endless Cookie (2025), and Starman (2025), with upcoming features that include Westhampton (2025), She's the He (2025), and Blue Film (2025).

== History ==
In October 2025, Obscured acquired U.S. distribution rights to Stop the Insanity: Finding Susan Powter (2025), a documentary directed by Zeberiah Newman and executive produced by Jamie Lee Curtis, featuring '90s fitness and nutrition influencer Susan Powter. In the same month, Obscured also acquired distribution rights to Endless Cookie (2025), an animated documentary directed by half-brothers Seth Scriver and Pete Scriver. The film went on to earn a nomination for Best Documentary Feature at the 2026 Film Independent Spirit Awards.

In December 2025, Obscured acquired distribution rights to Westhampton (2025), a feature film directed by Christian Nilsson and starring Finn Wittrock, RJ Mitte, Jake Weary, Amy Forsyth, Joy Suprano, Sam Strike, and Tovah Feldshuh.

In January 2026, Obscured acquired distribution rights to Starman (2025), a documentary directed by Academy Award nominee Robert Stone, featuring space engineer and sci-fi author Gentry Lee.

Later that month, Obscured also acquired rights to She's the He (2025), a trans coming-of-age comedy directed by Siobhan McCarthy, starring Misha Osherovich and Nico Carney. Misha Osherovich went on to earn a nomination for Best Breakthrough Performance at the 2026 Film Independent Spirit Awards.

In February 2026, Obscured acquired rights to Blue Film (2025), a queer psychological thriller directed by Elliot Tuttle, starring Kieron Moore and Reed Birney, and executive produced by Birney and Eric Kohn.

== Filmography ==
Release date	Title	Notes
November 19, 2025	Stop the Insanity: Finding Susan Powter	
December 5, 2025	Endless Cookie	
February 6, 2026	Starman	
May 8, 2026	Blue Film	
June 5, 2026	She's the He	
July 10, 2026	Westhampton	
August 7, 2026	The Big Cheese	

=== Upcoming ===
Release date	Title	Notes
October 2, 2026	Lady	
2027	The Drug In Our Pocket	
TBA	Ugly Cry	
