= Westhampton Beach High School =

Location
- 49 Lilac Road; Westhampton Beach, New York 11978; United States; 40°49′10″N 72°38′56″W

Information
- Type: Public
- School district: Westhampton Beach Union Free School District
- Principal: Christopher Herr
- Teaching staff: 82.65 (on an FTE basis)
- Grades: 9–12
- Enrollment: 991 (2023–2024)
- Student to teacher ratio: 11.99
- Colors: Green , Gray & White
- Team name: Hurricanes
- Accreditation: State of New York
- Newspaper: The Hurricane Eye
- Website: WHBHS

Westhampton Beach High School is a public four-year high school for grades 9-12 in Westhampton Beach, New York, which is located at the southeastern end of Suffolk County on Long Island.

== Notable alumni ==
- Rick Rasmussen, surfer; attended until age 15
- John Hart Ely, legal scholar and Dean of Stanford Law School
- Dan Jiggetts, retired American football offensive linesman (Class of 1972)
- Sean Farrell, retired American football guard (Class of 1978)
- Dylan Laube, NFL player for the Las Vegas Raiders (Class of 2018)
- Christian Nilsson, filmmaker best known for Westhampton (2025) and Dashcam (2021) (Class of 2006)
- (Actor) ( Star Trek:Picard ; Colony ) (Class of 1998 Jermain Hollman https://de.wikipedia.org/wiki/Jermain_Hollman
