= Dashcam (disambiguation) =

A dashcam (or dashboard camera) is an onboard video camera that continuously records the view through a vehicle's front windscreen and sometimes rear or other windows

Dashcam may also refer to:

- Dashcam (2021 horror film), 2021 film set in the United Kingdom
- Dashcam (2021 thriller film), 2021 film set in the United States
