= Christian Nilsson =

Christian Nilsson may refer to:

- Christian Nilsson (golfer)
- Christian Nilsson (filmmaker)
