= Kieron Moore =

Kieron Moore may refer to

- Kieron Moore (Irish actor) (1924-2007), Irish actor
- Kieron Moore (English actor) (fl. 2010s–2020s), English actor and boxer
