= Stop the Insanity: Finding Susan Powter =

- Directed by: Zeberiah Newman
- Produced by: Jamie Lee Curtis; John Redmann; Celia Aniskovich; Chad Hines; Michiel Thomas
- Starring: Susan Powter
- Cinematography: Michiel Thomas
- Edited by: Leah Turner
- Music by: Edward Bilous; Michelle DiBucci; Greg Kalember
- Distributed by: Obscured Releasing
- Release dates: June 18, 2025 (Bentonville Film Festival); November 19, 2025 (United States)
- Running time: 87 minutes
- Country: United States
- Language: English

Stop the Insanity: Finding Susan Powter is a 2025 American documentary film about the life of infomercial guru and fitness icon Susan Powter that is co-produced by actress Jamie Lee Curtis.

The film's director Zeberiah Newman said that it took him a year to find Powter. Co-producer Jamie Lee Curtis dubbed the documentary an "indictment" of the way society treats older people.

== Premise ==
The film explores 1990s infomercial, motivational speaker, and pop culture fitness icon, Susan Powter's meteoric rise to fame and the aftermath of crippling lawsuits and a bankrupted business which left her living in poverty and fading into obscurity.

== Release ==
The film premiered at the Bentonville Film Festival on June 18, 2025. The film was screened at the Big Bear Film Festival in September 2025. On October 2, 2025, it was announced that Obscured Releasing had acquired the North American distribution rights. The film was released theatrically on November 19, 2025, and was released to streaming platforms on December 9, 2025.

== Reception ==
On the review aggregator website Rotten Tomatoes, 64% of 11 critics' reviews are positive.
