= Dan Jiggetts =

American football player (born 1954)

No. 62
- Position: Offensive tackle

Personal information
- Born: March 10, 1954 (age 72); Brooklyn, New York, U.S.
- Listed height: 6 ft 4 in (1.93 m)
- Listed weight: 274 lb (124 kg)

Career information
- High school: Westhampton Beach (NY)
- College: Harvard
- NFL draft: 1976: 6th round, 161st overall pick

Career history
- Chicago Bears (1976–1982)

Awards and highlights
- Third-team All-American (1975); First-team All-East (1975)

Career NFL statistics
- Games played: 98
- Games started: 2
- Fumble recoveries: 1
- Stats at Pro Football Reference

Danny Marcellus Jiggetts (born March 10, 1954) is an American former professional football player who was an offensive lineman for the Chicago Bears of the National Football League (NFL). He played college football for the Harvard Crimson and was selected by the Bears in the 1976 NFL draft.

== Early life ==
Jiggetts was born in Brooklyn, but grew up on Long Island when his parents moved there soon after he was born. Excelling in both academics and athletics at Westhampton Beach High School, Jiggetts ranked in the top 10% of his class academically, earning a Rotary scholarship for college and was elected class president each of his four years of high school as well as earning eleven varsity letters in three different sports. He was extremely popular, noted a high school friend from Quogue, former United States Congressman Michael P. Forbes, who graduated a year earlier in 1971. Jiggetts was named a high school All-American defensive end, and also won the New York state regional championships in both the discus and shot put.

Jiggetts was heavily recruited out of high school for football. He signed a national letter of intent to go to Ohio State and play for their coach Woody Hayes, but eventually changed his mind and decided to enroll in Harvard instead in order to keep a promise he made to his mother who died four days after his high school graduation.

== Collegiate playing career ==
Playing offensive tackle for Harvard, Jiggetts was named All-Ivy League three times and All-East twice as well as All-American by both the AP and UPI during his senior year in 1975. Named captain of Harvard's 1975 football team, he was not only the first African American to be honored as such, but he also helped lead the team to its first undisputed Ivy League Championship. Considered to be one of the finest lineman in the history of the league, Jiggetts was named to the Ivy's Silver Anniversary All-Star Team and was inducted into the Harvard Varsity Hall of Fame. After graduating, Jiggetts was selected in the sixth round of 1976 NFL draft by the Chicago Bears.

Jiggetts also competed for the Harvard Crimson track and field team as a weight thrower.

== Professional playing career ==
Jiggetts played 98 games as a backup offensive lineman for the Bears from 1976 to 1982. Released by the team during the 1983 preseason, Jiggetts went on to play one season each for the Chicago Blitz and San Antonio Gunslingers in the USFL before retiring in 1985.

During his playing career, Jiggetts was active in player-management labor relations in both the NFL and USFL. He served as a player representative for the Bears and was the vice-president of the National Football League Players Association at the time of the 1982 strike. Jiggetts was also involved in attempts to unionize USFL players as a member of the Blitz.

== Sportscasting career ==
Jiggetts joined NFL on CBS as an analyst in 1985. In 1987, 1989–1991, and 1993, he has split play-by-play partners with James Brown and Brad Nessler.

He co-hosted "Monsters of the Midday in the Morning" with Mike North on CBS 2 Chicago from February 1 to August 27, 2010. He started working with North on their "Monsters of the Midday" radio program in 1992 as part of the launch of Chicago's WSCR sports radio station, known as "The Score," which is now at 670-AM. They co-hosted Monsters of the Midday for eight years. The Monsters and Money show was not considered a news program by station management but was added to the lineup as an attempt to increase its advertising revenue earning potential, its experimental format of combining sports talk by Jiggetts and North with news headlines, weather and discussions of financial matters never really caught on with viewers. He is also a sportscaster for NBC Sports Chicago and was the co-host of a daily morning show on the station. He has also worked for CBS and ESPN and hosted a highly rated radio show on WSCR in Chicago. In September 2010, he returned to WFLD-TV to anchor sports on Fridays and Saturdays.

Jiggetts currently hosts several shows on NBC Sports Chicago. He was inducted into the Suffolk Sports Hall of Fame on Long Island, New York, in the Football Category with the Class of 1990.

Personally, Jiggetts is married to Karen and has two daughters, Lauren and Kristan.

Lauren is a newscaster for the WGN-TV Early Morning News in Chicago.
