= The Susan Powter Show =

- Television advertisement
- Genre: Talk show
- Presented by: Susan Powter
- Country of origin: United States

Production
- Producers: Mary Aloe; Kelly Ehrlich; Nancy Lamfers
- Running time: 48 mins.
- Production companies: Woody Fraser Productions; Katz/Rush Entertainment; Multimedia Entertainment

Original release
- Network: First-run syndication
- Release: September 6, 1994 – May 26, 1995

The Susan Powter Show is an American talk show that aired in syndication from 1994 to 1995 and was hosted by diet guru Susan Powter.

== Format ==
Hosted by Susan Powter, the show covered a range of topics, from social and political issues to tabloid headlines, with a focus on matters pertinent to women.
