= Never (film) =

- Film poster
- Directed by: Brett Allen Smith
- Written by: Brett Allen Smith
- Starring: Zelda Williams; Zachary Booth
- Distributed by: Indican Pictures
- Release date: March 6, 2014 (Cinequest)
- Country: United States
- Language: English

Never is a 2014 American drama film written and directed by Brett Allen Smith and starring Zelda Williams and Zachary Booth.

== Plot ==
Straight man, Denim, falls in love with Nikki, a lesbian singer-songwriter. Their regrets over failed romantic relationships creates a bond between them.

== Cast ==
- Zachary Booth as Denim
- Zelda Williams as Nikki
- Nicole Gale Anderson as Meghan
- Angela Sarafyan as Rachel
