= Siobhan McCarthy (filmmaker) =

American filmmaker

- Occupations: Director, screenwriter
- Known for: She's the He

Siobhan McCarthy is an American filmmaker. They are known for writing and directing the 2025 film, She's the He.

At the age of 17, McCarthy dropped out of high school and ran away from home. They worked as a professional ballerina and circus performer, but felt unhappy with this work by the age of 18. While being filmed for the fashion magazine i-D, McCarthy got to know the cinematographer, and convinced him to hire them as a production assistant.

As a child, McCarthy loved the movies She's the Man, Clueless, and Mean Girls; these and other films they grew up with, along with Some Like it Hot, inspired She's the He, their directorial debut. They came up with the idea for the film in February 2024, quickly wrote a draft script, and started filming that July. McCarthy insisted that all of the cast members of She's the He be queer, transgender, or non-binary. The film premiered at the 2025 SXSW Film Festival.

McCarthy is transgender and non-binary, and goes by they/them pronouns. They came out as trans while in high school.
