= She's the He =

2025 film by Siobhan McCarthy

- Theatrical release poster
- Directed by: Siobhan McCarthy
- Written by: Siobhan McCarthy
- Produced by: Vic Brandt; Halley Albert
- Starring: Misha Osherovich; Nico Carney; Suzanne Cryer; Malia Pyles; Mark Indelicato; Emmett Preciado; Tatiana Ringsby; Aparna Nancherla; Kyle Butenhoff; Emma Orr
- Cinematography: Bethany Michalski
- Edited by: Will Geare; Siobhan McCarthy
- Music by: Siobhan McCarthy; Nolan McCarthy
- Production company: T4T Productions
- Distributed by: Obscured Releasing
- Release dates: March 9, 2025 (SXSW); June 5, 2026 (United States)
- Running time: 81 minutes
- Country: United States
- Language: English

She's the He is a 2025 American coming-of-age comedy film written and directed by Siobhan McCarthy and produced by Halley Albert and Vic Brandt. The film had its world premiere in the Narrative Spotlight section of the South by Southwest Film & TV Festival on March 9, 2025. It was released in the United States on June 5, 2026, by Obscured Releasing.

== Premise ==
Before graduation, Ethan and Alex pose as trans women in a last ditch effort to quell gay rumors. It is all a joke until Ethan realizes: she really is trans. The two must reckon with their changing friendship, coming out, and coming-of-age.

== Cast ==
- Misha Osherovich as Ethan
- Nico Carney as Alex
- Suzanne Cryer as Mary
- Mark Indelicato as Davis
- Malia Pyles as Sasha
- Emmett Preciado as Jacob
- Tatiana Ringsby as Forest
- Aparna Nancherla
- Kyle Butenhoff as Brent
- Derrick Joseph DeBlasis as Coach Doug
- Emma Orr as Victoria

== Release ==
She's the He had its world premiere in the Narrative Spotlight section of the South by Southwest Film & TV Festival on March 9, 2025, where it received a standing ovation. It later screened at the 2025 BFI London Film Festival in the Laugh strand. In January 2026, Obscured Releasing acquired North American distribution rights to the film. It opened in theaters in New York City on June 5, 2026, and in Los Angeles on June 19, followed by a video on demand release on June 30.

== Reception ==
On the review aggregator website Rotten Tomatoes, 100% of 40 critics' reviews are positive, with an average rating of 7.7/10. The website's consensus reads: "She's the He refreshes the high school comedy formula with sharp wit and genuine heart to craft an endearingly scrappy, resonant story of belonging and identity."

Osherovich received a nomination for Best Breakthrough Performance at the 41st Independent Spirit Awards. The film received a jury special mention at NewFest.

In her review for The Hollywood Reporter, critic Lovia Gyarkye called the film "reliably delightful" and added, "At a time when the lives of trans people face greater threats because of Trump administration policies and cultural fearmongering, She's the He gains greater resonance via the way it tackles this reality."
