= Rick Rasmussen =

American surfer

Richard S. Rasmussen (1955 – August 26, 1982) was an American professional surfer.

He was born in New York City, son of a United States Marine Corps pilot and traveled the United States extensively in his formative years, the only constant being the ocean. His family settled in Westhampton Beach where he attended Westhampton Beach High School until the age of 15, when he ran away from home to pursue his professional surfing dreams. He became the United States Surfing Champion. He was from Westhampton, New York. He was filmed for the TV show The American Sportsman. He was the first East Coast surfer to win the US Surfing Championships.

He was shot and killed in a drug deal gone bad in 1982.
