= Dylan Laube =

American football player (born 1999)

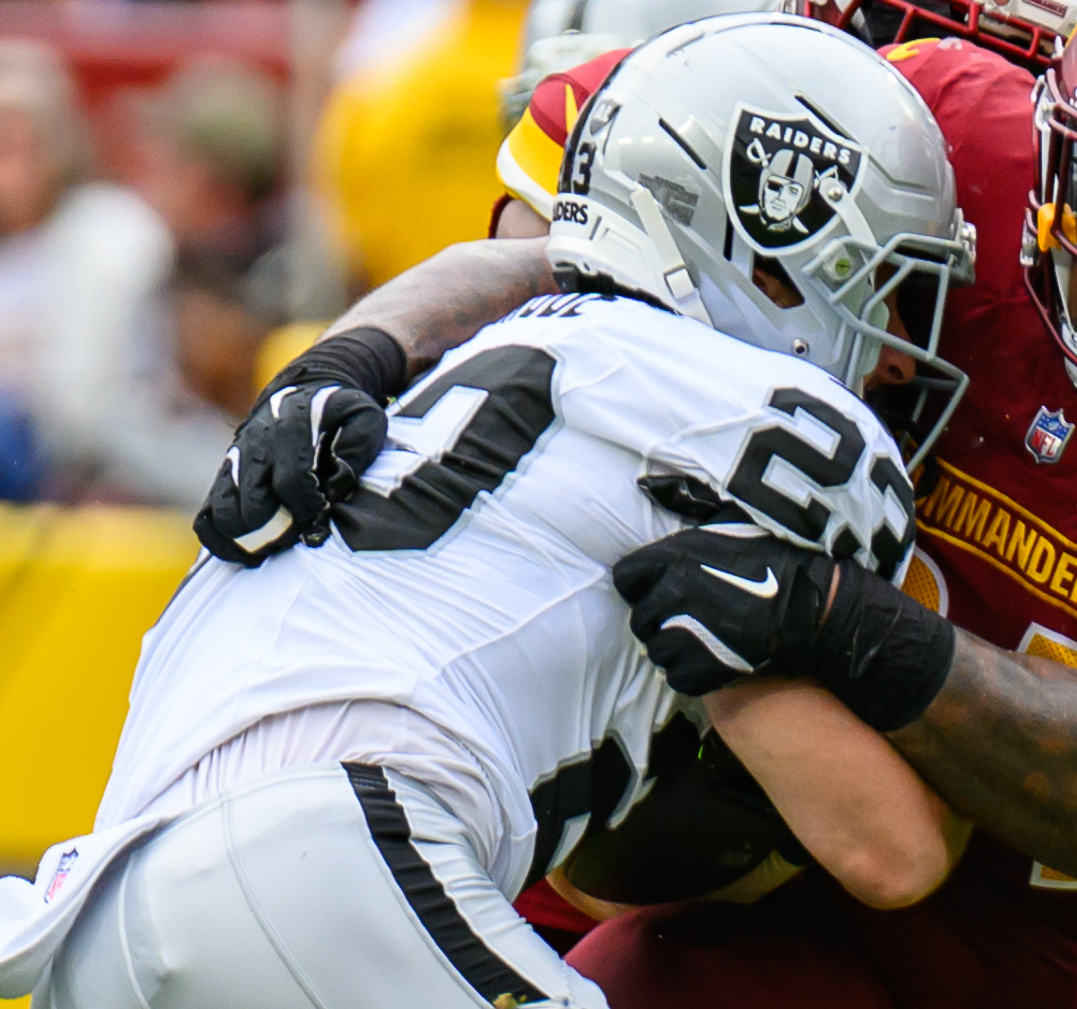
- Laube with the Las Vegas Raiders in 2025

No. 23 – Las Vegas Raiders
- Position: Running back
- Roster status: Active

Personal information
- Born: December 14, 1999 (age 26); Westhampton, New York, U.S.
- Listed height: 5 ft 9 in (1.75 m)
- Listed weight: 204 lb (93 kg)

Career information
- High school: Westhampton Beach (NY)
- College: New Hampshire (2018–2023)
- NFL draft: 2024: 6th round, 208th overall pick

Career history
- Las Vegas Raiders (2024–present)

Awards and highlights
- First-team FCS All-American (2023); Second-team All-CAA (2022)

Career NFL statistics as of Week 9, 2026
- Rushing yards: 18
- Receiving yards: 33
- Return yards: 1,841
- Total touchdowns: 2
- Stats at Pro Football Reference

Dylan Laube (born December 14, 1999) is an American professional football running back and kick returner for the Las Vegas Raiders of the National Football League (NFL). He played college football for the New Hampshire Wildcats.

== Early life ==
Laube was born in Westhampton, New York. He attended Westhampton Beach High School where he played football and lacrosse. He totaled 120 career touchdowns, including a Long Island-record 47 scores as a senior while helping the school win their first Long Island class title. He ran for 2,680 yards as a senior and was named the Hansen Award winner as best player in Suffolk County.

In his high school career, Laube recorded 687 rush attempts for 6,495 yards and 101 touchdowns while having 64 receptions for 1,234 yards and 14 touchdowns, with five additional touchdowns off kick returns. He was chosen All-USA New York by USA Today, played in the Empire Challenge All-Star Game and was named All-Long Island by Newsday. Despite his accomplishments, he only received one athletic scholarship offer, from the FCS New Hampshire Wildcats, which he accepted.

== College career ==
Laube redshirted as a true freshman at University of New Hampshire in 2018, appearing in three games. The following year, he totaled 63 rushes for 285 yards, 28 receptions for 412 yards and 29 kick returns for 675 yards in 10 games, having 1,372 all-purpose yards while scoring five touchdowns. He was selected second-team Freshman All-American by Phil Steele for his performance. He had eight rushes for 33 yards and four catches for 10 yards in one game in the COVID-19-shortened 2020 season.

In 2021, Laube totaled 79 rush attempts for 501 yards with four touchdowns and 22 catches for 203 yards and another score. He earned seven All-America honors in 2022 after rushing for 1,205 yards, recording 464 receiving yards and scoring 17 total touchdowns. He was team captain and had 715 rushing yards, 699 receiving yards and 18 touchdowns as a senior in 2023 while repeating as an All-American. He was the FCS leader in all-purpose yards-per-game in his final two seasons. Laube declared for the 2024 NFL draft. He was invited to play at the East–West Shrine Bowl and Senior Bowl, and received an invitation to the NFL Scouting Combine.

== Professional career ==
Pre-draft measurables
Height	Weight	Arm length	Hand span	Wingspan	40-yard dash	10-yard split	20-yard split	20-yard shuttle	Three-cone drill	Vertical jump	Broad jump	Bench press
5 ft 9 7/8 in (1.77 m)	206 lb (93 kg)	29 3/8 in (0.75 m)	9 1/4 in (0.23 m)	5 ft 11 1/8 in (1.81 m)	4.54 s	1.52 s	2.64 s	4.02 s	6.84 s	37.0 in (0.94 m)	9 ft 10 in (3.00 m)	23 reps
All values from NFL Combine

=== 2024 season ===
Laube was drafted by the Las Vegas Raiders in the 6th round (208th overall) of the 2024 NFL Draft. Laube fumbled his first career carry in a 32–13 loss to the Pittsburgh Steelers in Week 6 of his rookie season. Laube also recorded the first tackle of his career during the game against the Steelers. In a Week 11 loss against the Denver Broncos, Laube returned a kick for 59 yards on the first kick return of his career in the 19–29 loss. In Week 12 against the Kansas City Chiefs, Laube returned two kicks for 36 yards and recorded a tackle on special teams in a 17–19 loss.

Laube finished the season with three tackles and 164 kick return yards.

=== 2025 season ===
Heading into week one of the 2025 season, he was named the fourth running back on the Raiders' depth chart. He was also named a backup kick returner and punt returner to Zamir White and Tre Tucker respectfully.

In the 2025 season, he would finish with 9 rushing yards, 3 receptions for 18 yards, and 855 kick return yards.

=== 2026 season ===
Entering the first week of 2026, he was named the third running back on the Raiders' depth chart, while becoming the starting kick returner and backup punt returner. He made his first career start against the Los Angeles Chargers, however, he did not record any statistics despite having 35 kickoff return yards. He recorded his first career touchdown against the New England Patriots; a three-yard rushing touchdown despite the 17–45 loss.

In Week 8 against the New York Jets, he recorded a 95-yard kickoff return touchdown during the second quarter. The touchdown helped the Raiders to a 38–33 victory, as well as snapping their 4–game losing streak. It was the first kickoff return touchdown of his career, as well as the first kickoff return touchdown of the 2026 season, and also the first kickoff return touchdown for the Raiders since Jacoby Ford in 2011. For his performance, Laube was named AFC Special Teams Player of the Week.

== NFL career statistics ==
Legend
**Bold**	Career high

=== Regular season ===
Year	Team	Games		Rushing					Receiving					Kick returns					Fumbles		Tackles		
Year	Team	GP	GS	Att	Yds	Avg	Lng	TD	Rec	Yds	Avg	Lng	TD	Ret	Yds	Avg	Lng	TD	Fum	Lost	Cmb	Solo	Ast
2024	LV	10	0	1	0	0.0	0	0	0	0	0.0	0	0	6	164	27.3	59	0	**1**	**1**	3	1	**2**
2025	LV	**17**	0	**7**	**9**	1.3	3	0	**3**	**18**	**6.0**	**13**	0	**33**	**855**	25.9	38	0	**1**	**1**	**5**	**3**	2
2026	LV	10	**1**	5	**9**	**1.8**	**5**	**1**	**4**	15	3.7	0	0	26	822	**31.6**	**95T**	**1**	**1**	0	5	1	**4**
Career		37	1	13	18	1.4	5	1	7	33	4.7	13	0	65	1,841	28.3	95T	1	3	2	13	5	8
