= Earnest Woodall =

American composer (born 1959)

- Origin: Commack, New York; New York; United States
- Genres: Avant-garde; Electronic; Jazz; 20th-century classical music Minimalism
- Occupations: guitarist, composer, sound engineer
- Years active: 1988–present
- Label: Zephyrwood Music
- Website: http://www.ewoodall.com/

Earnest Woodall (born July 24, 1959) is an American composer. Born in Bay Shore, New York and raised in suburban Long Island, New York, Woodall took up the guitar at age 10, inspired by rock, blues and jazz players. A local teacher Peter Rogine introduced him to the music of Philip Glass, Steve Reich and John Adams, as well as Miles Davis, John Coltrane, and Thelonious Monk and coming of age with the progressive music of Yes, Emerson, Lake & Palmer, and Pink Floyd which sparked a lifelong love of both 20th-century classical music, progressive rock and jazz. Earnest Woodall soon attended the Five Towns College of Music and then the Berklee College of Music, later moving into the local music scene of the New York Tri-State area with a wide variety of bandleaders and musicians.

Woodall can play more than one style of music with fluency, virtuosity and sincerity. Earnest Woodall proves it on his 2004 Zephyrwood Music release, Time to Think. The album confirms his reputation as an original composer/performer.

As well as recording his own music Woodall also composed and recorded music for many independent films from 1992 to 2000 and also has received two Meet the Composer grants from the National Endowment for the Arts (NEA) Composers Program

In the late 1980s and early 1990s, Woodall found himself in the center of the cassette tape underground culture and was reviewed by the most popular underground music zines of the time such as Option, Fact-Sheet Five, Tape Op, Ear, Wired, The Improviser, New Music Journal, See-Hear, and Creative Alternative.

Woodall also pulls a lot of influence from the eclectic randomness of Frank Zappa and the sounds produced by various progressive rock bands such as early Genesis, Peter Gabriel, Yes, and King Crimson.

== Reviews ==
This section is being revised as not to violate any copyright.

== Discography ==
=== Composition work ===
Haute Monde	1987
Albert's Warning	1988
House of Stairs	1988
Dirty Water	1990
Mad Man of 1st Avenue	1991
Three Worlds	1992
Abstract Paragraph	1995
Legerdemain	1997
Ergot Brew	1997
Strike, Light, Puff	1998
13	2000
Pictures in Mind	2002
Time to Think	2004
Sphere Acid Burn	2008
Slumber	2013
Random Transmutation	2015
Pondering	2016
Linger	2017
Aural Apparitions	2018
See Hear	2020

=== Guitar work ===
Album	Year
Guitar Works	1994
Live @ Benson Hall Cafe	2006

== See also ==
- Minimalist music
- Steve Reich
- John Adams
- Philip Glass
- Kronos Quartet
