= Catfight (film) =

- Theatrical release poster
- Directed by: Onur Tukel
- Written by: Onur Tukel
- Produced by: Greg Newman; Gigi Graff
- Starring: Sandra Oh; Anne Heche; Alicia Silverstone; Amy Hill; Tituss Burgess; Myra Lucretia Taylor; Ariel Kavoussi; Craig Bierko; Dylan Baker
- Cinematography: Zoe White
- Edited by: Onur Tukel
- Production company: MPI Media Group
- Distributed by: Dark Sky Films
- Release dates: September 9, 2016 (TIFF); March 3, 2017 (United States)
- Running time: 96 minutes
- Country: United States
- Language: English

Catfight is a 2016 American black comedy film directed and written by Onur Tukel and starring Sandra Oh, Anne Heche, Alicia Silverstone, Amy Hill, Myra Lucretia Taylor, Ariel Kavoussi, Craig Bierko, Tituss Burgess, and Dylan Baker. The film had its world premiere at the Toronto International Film Festival on September 9, 2016, before being released in a limited release and through video on demand on March 3, 2017, by Dark Sky Films.

== Plot ==
Artist Ashley Miller and housewife Veronica Salt are two unhappy women. Ashley is struggling to sell her artwork, straining her relationship with her girlfriend Lisa. Veronica, an alcoholic, treated with disdain by her husband Stanley, mocks her son Kip's drawing talent. Both women watch news reports on tension between the United States and the Middle East.

Stanley throws a party for his business partner. Lisa, the caterer, forces Ashley to help. Veronica comes for a drink and the two women recognize each other from college. Trying to make small talk, they descend into verbal barbs. Veronica is told to leave by her husband, and she runs into Ashley in the stairwell. They first sling insults, then fists. Ashley gets the upper hand, punching Veronica in the face. When Veronica tries to stand, she falls down the stairs and slips into a coma.

Two years later, Veronica awakens with no memory of the fight. She learns that her husband shot himself, her son died fighting the war in the Middle East, and all of her money was spent to pay for her treatment. She moves in with her former housekeeper Donna and lands a job as a maid. Ashley is now a famous artist; the war causes her dark paintings to become popular. She and Lisa decide to start a family, so Ashley is impregnated, using a sperm donor. Their differing beliefs cause them to become estranged.

Veronica finds a magazine with Ashley on the cover, annoyed at her success. She clashes with Donna about the war and moves out and into a cheap hotel. Veronica finds a video left to her by Kip, revealing he left school to join the Army to make her proud, and then she breaks down in tears. Then she goes to Ashley's gallery opening and seeing a painting depicting her own bloodied face, remembers their fight. She begins destroying the paintings, and as Ashley tries to stop her, Veronica punches Ashley and runs off with the painting of her face. Ashley runs after her and they begin beating each other with tools. Veronica overpowers Ashley, hitting her over the head with a wrench. Veronica stumbles away, while cinder block falls on Ashley's head, and she falls into a coma.

Two years later, Ashley awakens and discovers that she lost her baby during the coma, Lisa has left her, and she is broke after her paintings were sold to pay her hospital bills. The United States has won the war on terror, and her dark art style has lost all popularity. Sally, Ashley's assistant meanwhile, has become famous and rich as her comics about happy blue bunnies are popular. Ashley now has to work for her former assistant and tries to begin painting again, only to find she physically cannot because of her injuries.

Ashley finds a bus ticket to Pennsylvania, realizing it belongs to Veronica, who has been caring for her Aunt Charlie. Ashley suddenly appears, intending to "destroy" her. Veronica makes Ashley breakfast and Ashley accepts, and they discover they have some things in common. Veronica plays Ashley the recordings made by Kip, confessing that watching them makes her feel like her son is still with her, and has helped her overcome her anger towards Ashley. Ashley is moved, but then accidentally spills her water onto the camera. Veronica freaks out, revealing she never backed up the files. They begin fighting, going out into the woods. They end up sitting on the ground punching each other over and over again as they both break down sobbing. Aunt Charlie watches them fight from the window. The video camera suddenly reboots, revealing it was not broken after all.

== Cast ==
- Sandra Oh as Veronica Salt
- Anne Heche as Ashley Miller
- Alicia Silverstone as Lisa
- Ivana Miličević as Rachel
- Peter Jacobson as Carl
- Myra Lucretia Taylor as Donna
- Amy Hill as Aunt Charlie
- Damian Young as Stanley Salt
- Tituss Burgess as John
- Jordan Carlos as Howie
- Giullian Yao Gioiello as Kip Salt
- Dylan Baker as Doctor Jones
- Ariel Kavoussi as Sally
- Stephen Gevedon as Tom Ferguson
- Annie McCain Engman as Christie
- Marisa Vitali as Debbie

== Production ==
Principal photography on the film wrapped up in late December 2015 in New York City. The film was produced by MPI Media Group's Greg Newman along with Gigi Graff.

== Release ==
The film had its world premiere at the Toronto International Film Festival on September 9, 2016. Shortly after, Dark Sky Films acquired distribution rights to the film, and set it for a March 3, 2017, limited release and through video on demand.

== Reception ==
On review aggregator website Rotten Tomatoes, the film has an approval rating of 74% based on 61 reviews, and an average rating of 6.1/10. The website's critical consensus reads, "Smart, suitably nasty, and well-cast, Catfight lands narrative punches just as fast and hard-hitting as the physical violence doled out onscreen." On Metacritic, the film has a weighted average score 66 out of 100 based 17 critics, indicating "generally favorable" reviews.
