= Emmett Preciado =

American transgender actor and activist

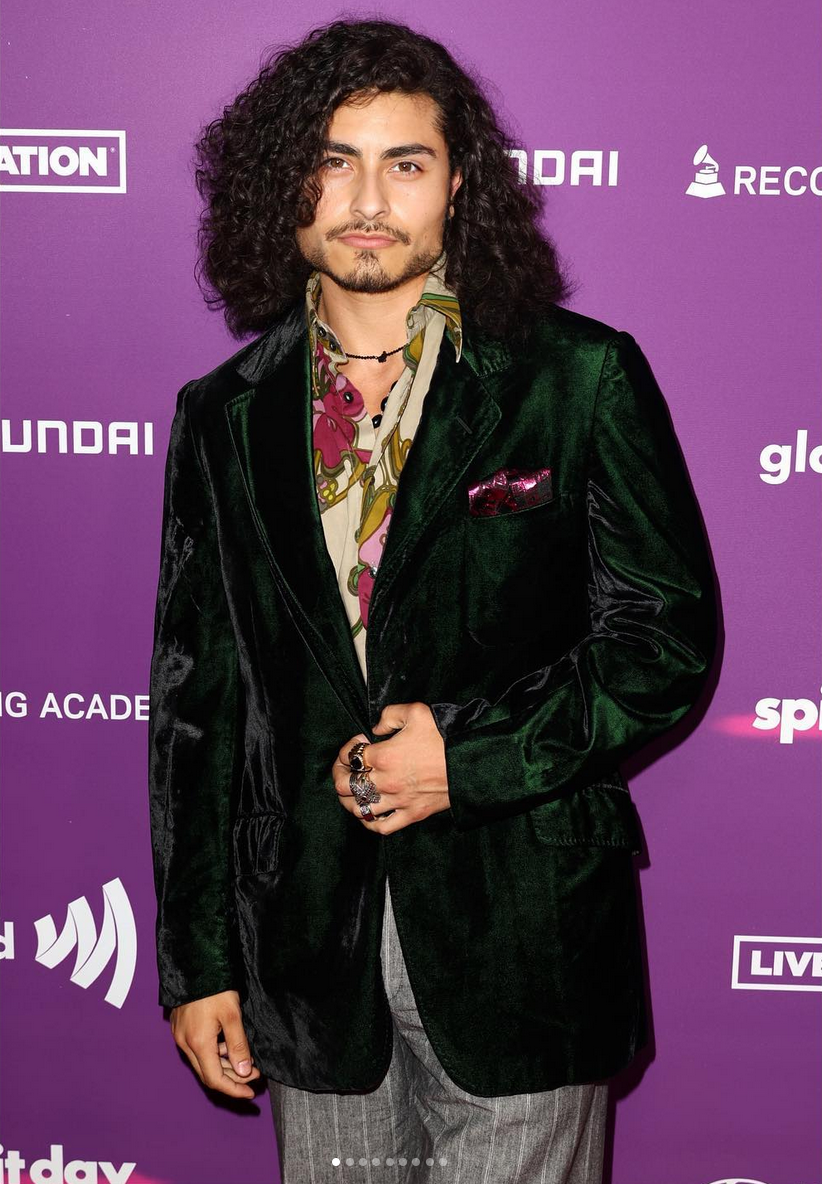
Emmett Preciado at the Glaad Spirit Concert, October 19, 2023

Emmett Preciado (born March 18, 1994), is an American actor, musician and activist for transgender rights, education and awareness. Preciado is best known for his recurring role as Rio Guitierrez in the popular ABC television show The Good Doctor and Rowan in Freeform/ABC Family television show Good Trouble.

== Early life ==
Preciado was born in Merced, California, and when he was a freshman in high school his family moved to South Sioux City, Nebraska. At age 19, Preciado left Nebraska to serve a full-time mission for The Church of Jesus Christ of Latter-day Saints. When Preciado returned from his mission, he attended a semester at Brigham Young University, Idaho.

== Career ==
Preciado received his first principal role in the spring of 2019. He is known for his role as Rowan on Freeform's Good Trouble. At the end of 2020, he shot his first guest star role as Rio Gutierrez on an episode of the ABC medical drama, The Good Doctor. Rio was well-received by fans and went on to become a recurring character.

In 2021, Preciado guest starred as Mateo Cruz on ABC's Rebel. It was announced in 2024 that Preciado will be in the LGBTQ film Affirmation.

=== Filmography ===
Film, television and video game roles
Year	Title	Role	Notes
2025	She's the He	Jacob	film
2024	Back to Basecamp	Tomas	Short
2023	Rainbow Six: Siege	Tubarão	Video Game
2023	Dead by Daylight	Tubarão	Video Game
2021-2022	Good Trouble	Rowan	TV Series
2021	Rebel	Mateo	TV Series
2021	The Good Doctor	Rio Guitierrez	TV Series
2020	The Wolf of Snow Hollow	Dorm Boy	Film
2020	Freeze Your Brain	Tommy	Short

== Personal life ==
Preciado is transgender. In 2015, Preciado discontinued his studies at BYU and moved to Utah to undergo his physical transition from female to male. He garnered millions of views and followers on social media from documenting his transition. Preciado is also an activist, making appearances and speaking in events and videos to raise awareness about LGBTQ issues.

Preciado changed his surname from 'Claren' when his family discovered their real name 'Preciado' using 23andMe DNA testing for ancestry.

== See also ==
- The Good Doctor
- Good Trouble (TV series)
