= Blue Film (2025 film) =

2025 American drama film

- Theatrical release poster
- Directed by: Elliot Tuttle
- Written by: Elliot Tuttle
- Produced by: Bijan Kazerooni; Will Youmans; Adam Kersh; Waylon Sall
- Starring: Kieron Moore; Reed Birney
- Cinematography: Ryan Jackson-Healy
- Edited by: Zach Clark
- Music by: Isaac Eiger
- Production company: Fusion Entertainment
- Distributed by: Obscured Releasing
- Release dates: August 16, 2025 (Edinburgh); May 8, 2026 (United States)
- Running time: 85 minutes
- Country: United States
- Language: English
- Box office: $155,000

Blue Film is a 2025 American drama film written and directed by Elliot Tuttle. It stars Kieron Moore as a sex worker and Reed Birney as a former middle school teacher — and self-admitted pederast — who reconnect.

It had its world premiere at the Edinburgh International Film Festival on August 16, 2025, and was released on May 8, 2026, by Obscured Releasing.

== Plot ==
Aaron Eagle, a Los Angeles camboy who specializes in financial domination, is offered $50,000 to spend a night with one of his viewers, who answers the door of his rental house wearing a balaclava to hide his identity. He sets up a camera and asks Aaron a series of increasingly personal questions. While Aaron eventually opens up, revealing that he was born in Bedford, Maine and describing a sexual encounter where he fulfilled one couple's rape fantasy which inspired him to become a professional dominant, he refuses to answer a question about a tattoo above his eye reading "Diablo." After a heated confrontation, Aaron's client reveals that he knows Aaron's real name, Alex McConnell; angrily, Aaron unmasks the client, revealing him to be his middle school English teacher, Hank Grant.

Hank is a pederast who was arrested for attempting to assault one of his students, James Scott, with the intention of molesting him; after a change of heart, he let the boy go, and served seven years in prison. He still lives in Bedford, working at a supermarket, and has turned to religion later in life. He says that he was in love with Aaron, who he remembers as a lonely young boy who was frequently in school detention, and flew out to Los Angeles to spend a night with him and learn about what became of him. Hank begins to perform oral sex on Aaron, but stops himself. After drinking a few beers and having an earnest conversation about the nature of perversion, Hank shaves Aaron's body hair and fulfills a perverted sexual fantasy until Aaron grows uncomfortable and physically forces Hank to stop.

Aaron and Hank converse further. Aaron says that his first sexual experience was being molested by his aunt, while Hank recalls a song Aaron performed at the school talent show and asks him to sing it again; Aaron refuses. Hank attributes his pedophilia to being raped by his grandfather, also named Hank, from a very young age, with the tacit approval of his mother, and laments that his life was consumed by meaningless sexual urges. Aaron admits that he was never molested by his aunt, defends his sex work, and tearfully attributes his "Diablo" tattoo to his ex-boyfriend, Rafael, with whom he is no longer on speaking terms. Hank and Aaron have sex, but Hank is unable to get an erection, and Aaron masturbates himself to completion. Cuddling afterwards, Hank confesses that he did not actually have a change of heart when assaulting James, and that the boy got away on his own.

The next morning, Hank leaves to return to Maine, giving Aaron the rest of his money as well as old yearbook photos of a young Alex and Hank. Aaron takes a shower in the rental property, singing to himself.

== Cast ==
- Kieron Moore as Aaron Eagle/Alex McConnell
- Reed Birney as Hank Grant

== Production ==
In December 2024, it was announced Kieron Moore and Reed Birney had joined the cast of the film, with Elliot Tuttle directing from a screenplay he wrote, and Mark Duplass serving as a consulting producer. Principal photography took place over the course of two weeks.

== Release ==
The film had its world premiere at the Edinburgh International Film Festival on August 16, 2025. It was previously rejected from multiple festivals, including the Sundance Film Festival and South by Southwest. The film also screened at Newfest on October 11, 2025. In February 2026, Obscured Releasing acquired U.S. distribution rights to the film. It was given a limited release from May to September 2026, and earned $144,000 in the United States from 13 theaters.

== Reception ==
=== Critical reception ===
On the review aggregator website Rotten Tomatoes, 91% of 56 critics' reviews are positive. The website's consensus reads: "Equal parts bracing and sensitive in its exorcism of the taboo, Blue Film is provocative without being exploitative thanks to phenomenal performances and writer-director Elliot Tuttle's emotional frankness." On Metacritic, the film has a weighted average score of 86 out of 100 based on 10 critics, which the site labels as "universal acclaim".
