= Julie's Greenroom =

American educational pre-school television series

- Genre: Educational; Puppetry; Musical; Children's
- Created by: Julie Andrews; Emma Walton Hamilton; Judy Rothman; Andrew Agnew
- Starring: Julie Andrews; Giullian Yao Gioiello
- Voices of: Stephanie D'Abruzzo; Jennifer Barnhart; Tyler Bunch; Frankie Cordero; Dorien Davies; John Kennedy; John Tartaglia
- Composer: Ryan Shore
- Country of origin: United States
- Original language: English
- No. of seasons: 1
- No. of episodes: 13

Production
- Executive producers: Julie Andrews; Emma Walton Hamilton; Judy Rothman; Steve Sauer; Andrew Agnew; Lisa Henson; Halle Stanford
- Running time: 30 minutes
- Production company: The Jim Henson Company

Original release
- Network: Netflix
- Release: March 17, 2017

Julie's Greenroom is an American educational pre-school television series that was released on Netflix on March 17, 2017.

== Characters ==
- Miss Julie (portrayed by Julie Andrews) – The director of the Wellspring Center for the Performing Arts. She teaches performing arts in its theater and "greenroom."
- Gus (portrayed by Giullian Yao Gioiello) – Miss Julie's assistant and a graduate of the Greenies workshop.
- The Greenies – A diverse group of kids that are mesmerized by all the arts and creativity that they are offered.
  - Hugo the Duck (performed by Tyler Bunch) – A domesticated duck.
  - Hank (performed by John Tartaglia) – A paraplegic member of the Greenies.
  - Fizz (performed by Dorien Davies) – Member of the Greenies.
  - Peri (performed by Stephanie D'Abruzzo) – A showy, starstruck, and aspiring singer and actress.
  - Riley (performed by Jennifer Barnhart) – a non-binary member who is an aspiring actor and mechanic.
  - Spike (performed by Frankie Cordero) – Hank's friend and a fan of words and rhyming.
  - Toby the Dog (performed by John Kennedy) – A dog.

== Production ==
The show stars British actress Julie Andrews (best known as the star of The Sound of Music and Mary Poppins), who is joined by her assistant Gus (Giullian Yao Gioiello) and "The Greenies", a cast of original puppets built by The Jim Henson Company.

The episodes include elements of the performing arts, such as an original song. Each episode features a guest star who engages the puppets in a specific area of the performing arts. Guest stars include Alec Baldwin, Sara Bareilles, Joshua Bell, Tituss Burgess, Carol Burnett, Chris Colfer, Robert Fairchild, Josh Groban, Bill Irwin, Ellie Kemper, Idina Menzel, Tiler Peck, David Hyde Pierce, Stomp, Mary Scheer, Rachel Tucker and the Story Pirates.

The thirteen 30-minute episodes on Netflix on March 17, 2017.

The series’ original score was composed by Ryan Shore.

== Episodes ==
No.	Title	Original release date
1	"The Show Must Go On"	March 17, 2017
Miss Julie and Gus welcome the Greenies to the Wellspring Center for Performing Arts. When a disaster happens on their first day, Miss Julie and the Greenies are able to get through with it with the help of Idina Menzel and the Broadway musical Wicked where current Elphaba, Rachel Tucker, gave them a backstage tour .
2	"The Write Stuff"	March 17, 2017
Chris Colfer helps the Greenies write an original show.
3	"Singin' in the Room"	March 17, 2017
As the Greenies plan a surprise birthday party for Miss Julie, Josh Groban teaches them all about singing.
4	"Hello from the Ogre Side"	March 17, 2017
At the time when Peri has become upset at having to be cast as an ogre for an upcoming show, Alec Baldwin gives the Greenies their first acting lesson.
5	"Barre None"	March 17, 2017
When Hank and Spike think that ballet is mostly for females, Robert Fairchild and Tiler Peck help to prove them wrong.
6	"Write...Write a Song"	March 17, 2017
Sara Bareilles teaches the Greenies on how to write a song. During this time, Hank and Spike discover that it's not easy for two people to write a song together.
7	"Morning at the Improv"	March 17, 2017
As the Greenies' rehearsals aren't going well, Ellie Kemper teaches them how to listen and how they can work together through improv.
8	"Quacktice Makes Perfect"	March 17, 2017
Joshua Bell helps to teach the Greenies on how practicing is more important and how to perform music together.
9	"Send in the WOW"	March 17, 2017
When Riley doesn't believe that they can be much of a jester, Bill Irwin shows them how to find their inner clown with some help from Cirque du Soleil.
10	"Rhythm is Gonna Get You"	March 17, 2017
When the Greenies learn that their instruments have been sent to the wrong address, they are shown by the percussion group Stomp how to use everyday items in order to make their own music.
11	"Costumer Service"	March 17, 2017
The Greenies receive help in making costumes for their upcoming show by Tituss Burgess where he shows them how clothes make the character.
12	"The Mess Rehearsal"	March 17, 2017
Following the Greenies' disastrous dress rehearsal, Miss Julie receives help from David Hyde Pierce to talk the Greenies into having a little faith in themselves.
13	"Mash-Up: The Musical"	March 17, 2017
The Greenies perform Mash-Up: The Musical for Edna Brightful (portrayed by Carol Burnett), who holds the future of the Wellspring Center for the Performing Arts in her hands.
