= Christian Nilsson (filmmaker) =

American filmmaker

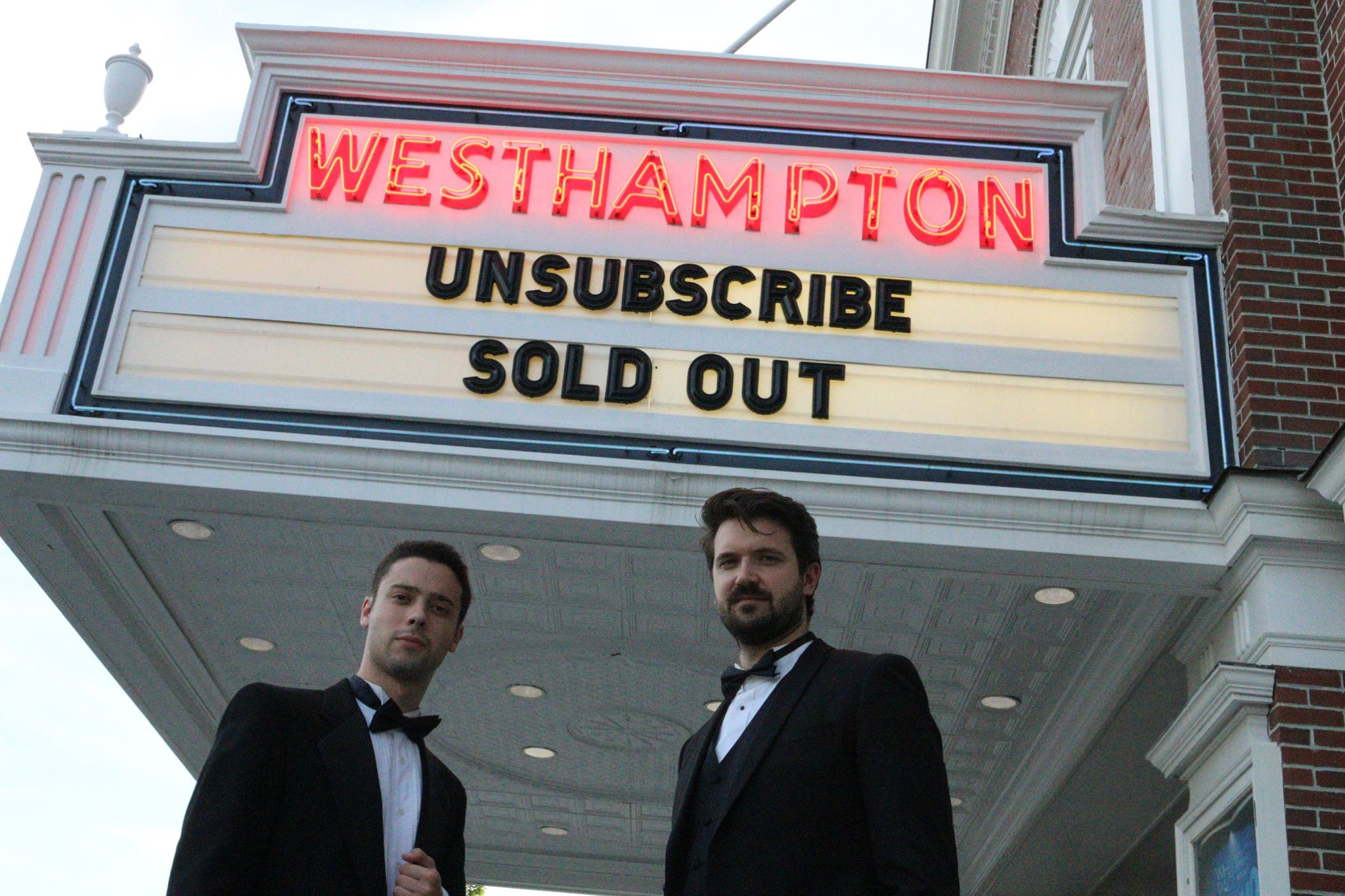
Eric Tabach (left) and Christian Nilsson (right) in 2020

Christian Nilsson (born December 31, 1987) is an American film director and screenwriter. He is best known for the meta-drama Westhampton (2025), psychological thriller Dashcam (2021) and his short Unsubscribe (2020), a 29-minute horror film that topped the U.S. box office in June 2020 after Nilsson and YouTuber Eric Tabach exploited a loophole during the COVID-19 pandemic.

== Career ==
=== Digital Media ===
Nilsson's career began in digital media, where he worked as a video journalist and content creator for various outlets like HuffPost, Esquire, BuzzFeed, and The Atlantic.

=== Unsubscribe ===
In May 2020, YouTuber Eric Tabach called Nilsson to ask how he could potentially get one of his own YouTube videos to become the number one film in the U.S. box office. Nilsson explained "four-walling", the distribution technique where a filmmaker rents out an entire theater which allows them to keep all the profits. Because theaters were closed due to the COVID-19 pandemic, Nilsson predicted they'd be able to rent out a closed theater for very little money, buy every ticket themselves for several showings, then keep the profits—essentially, breaking even.

Nilsson wrote the script for Unsubscribe in one day, and filming began the next day with Tabach's friends and fellow YouTubers including Charlie Tahan (Ozark, I Am Legend), Michelle Khare (HBO Max's Karma), Zach Kornfeld (Try Guys) and Thomas Brag (Yes Theory). A majority of the film was shot over Zoom in just three days

The film follows five YouTubers who hold a video-call for their friend's birthday only to find themselves hunted and haunted by an internet troll.

On June 20, 2020, Nilsson and Tabach premiered the film at the Westhampton Beach Performing Arts Center in Westhampton Beach, New York. They bought out five showings and racked up $25,488 in ticket sales. The following day, the film was listed on Box Office Mojo and The Numbers as the number one film in the U.S. box office.

The film garnered mostly positive reviews for its creation process and ability to gain high rankings during the COVID-19 pandemic. The Washington Post praised the film as "a testament to artistic ingenuity under lockdown", while NME called the film an "entertaining hoax", and Fox News opined that "garnering a No. 1 release – albeit short-lived since Unsubscribe failed to throw off weekend box office numbers – is a stout accomplishment in itself". Other sources were more ambivalent, such as Decider, which stated that "[w]hether this stunt is a stroke of brilliance or a stroke of shameless self-promotion is up to you", while Trillmag said that "Unsubscribe's status as a historical filmmaking achievement is indicated by the unorthodox (and deviously scheming) method through which it achieved box office success"

=== Dashcam ===
In December 2020, Deadline Hollywood announced Nilsson and Tabach partnered with production companies Kamikaze Dogfight and Hood River Entertainment to finance Nilsson's feature-length directorial debut, Dashcam. The psychological thriller stars Tabach with Giorgia Whigham, Larry Fessenden, Zachary Booth, Guillian Gioiello and Noa Fisher in supporting roles.

Dashcam world premiered virtually at Popcorn Frights Film Festival in Miami, Florida in August 2021, and was released by Gravitas Ventures in the US on October 19, 2021. The film was included on The New York Times list of "Five Horror Films To Stream" for November 2021, and wrote that the film is "at its creepiest when just audio and video clips, and Jake's surgical adjustments to them, steer the paranoia-driven story. Over 82 unnerving minutes, Nilsson squeezes big suspense out of seemingly throwaway moments, as when Jake just sits and listens to audio tracks."

On review aggregator Rotten Tomatoes, the film holds an approval rating of 100%. Critic Alexandra Heller-Nicholas wrote: "Dashcam is an extraordinary low-budget political thriller that does a lot with a little, and is a masterclass that sometimes, having the guts to punch above its weight can pay off just through sheer audacity alone." Another wrote, "Working with miniscule [sic] budget, writer/director Christian Nilsson upstages his better-financed moneyed counterparts with this gripping political thriller."

=== Westhampton ===
Nilsson wrote and directed the drama Westhampton, starring Finn Wittrock, RJ Mitte, Jake Weary, Amy Forsyth, Tovah Feldshuh and Dan Lauria. Wittrock plays Tom Bell, a struggling filmmaker who returns to his Long Island hometown years after causing a fatal accident in high school. There, he confronts the former friends whose lives were affected both by the tragedy and by the semi-autobiographical film he subsequently made about it. The narrative alternates between Tom’s homecoming and excerpts from his black-and-white 16mm film, gradually revealing how he altered the events he depicted onscreen.

The film had its world premiere in the Spotlight Narrative section of the 2025 Tribeca Festival. It later received the Jury Award for Directing at the Stony Brook Film Festival and was named Best Feature at the CineSol Film Festival. In December 2025, Obscured Releasing acquired the film’s North American distribution rights. It opened theatrically in the United States on July 10, 2026, followed by a digital release.

On Rotten Tomatoes, the film holds a 75% approval rating based on 12 reviews. Next Best Picture awarded it seven out of ten, calling it “tender, thoughtful, and film-literate” and praising Nilsson’s handling of the film-within-a-film structure, Wittrock’s performance and Dave Brick’s cinematography. ScreenAnarchy praised Nilsson’s screenplay for its dry humor and bittersweet irony, as well as the film’s refusal to simplify its characters’ unresolved conflicts. The Hollywood Reporter offered a more reserved assessment, praising Wittrock while finding the central character study thin and the homecoming narrative familiar.

=== Paparazzo ===
Nilsson's screenplay, Paparazzo, appeared on the 2024 The Black List, an annual survey conducted among Hollywood executives to identify the most well-liked unproduced movie scripts. According to Deadline Hollywood, the film follows an opportunistic outcast, desperate for fast cash to help his ailing mother, who partners with a wily paparazzo that entangles them in a homicide involving young celebutantes. In December 2025, the screenplay was picked up by Passage Pictures, the production company behind films White Noise and Marjorie Prime, and is now in development.

== Filmography ==
| Film | Year | Director | Writer | Notes |
|---|---|---|---|---|
| Unsubscribe | 2020 | Yes | Yes | Short film |
| Dashcam | 2021 | Yes | Yes | Feature-length directorial debut |
| Westhampton | 2025 | Yes | Yes | Feature film |
| Paparazzo | TBD | Yes | Yes | Feature film |

== Personal life ==
Nilsson married Stephanie Hains on October 10, 2020.
