= Giullian Yao Gioiello =

American actor and musician (born 1992)

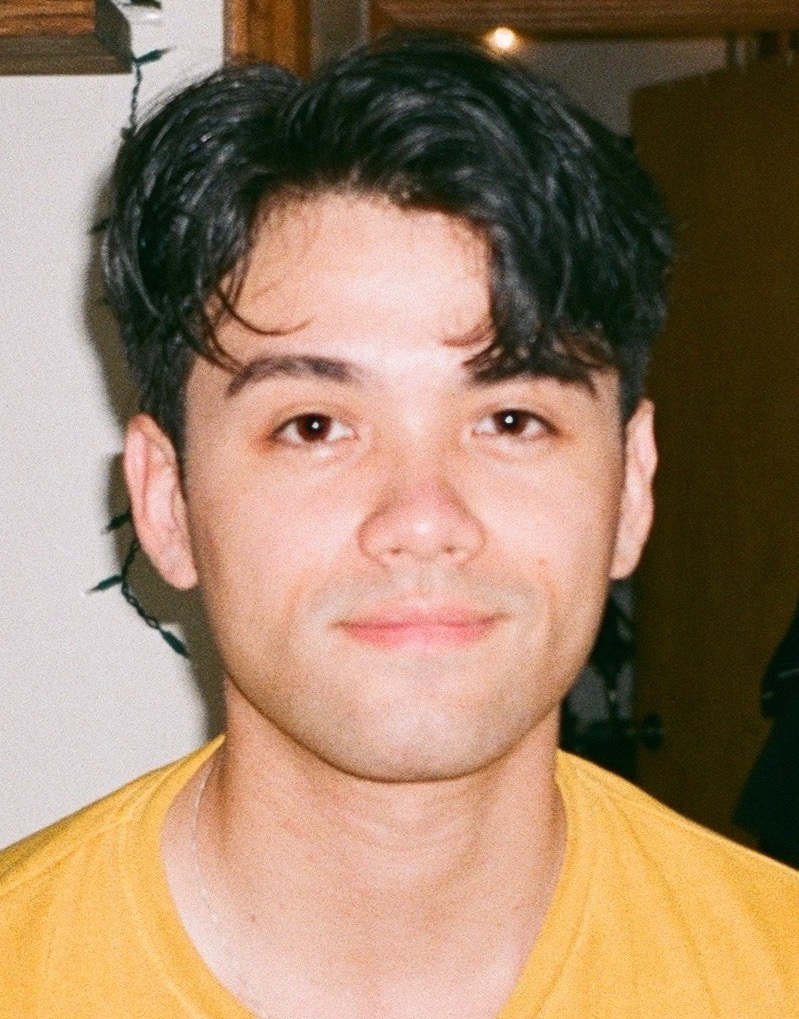
- Gioiello in 2019
- Born: September 24, 1992 (age 34); New York City, U.S.
- Other name: Tarune
- Education: Fiorello H. LaGuardia High School; New York University
- Occupations: Actor; musician; songwriter
- Years active: 2008–present

Giullian Yao Gioiello (born September 24, 1992) is an American actor, musician and songwriter. He is known for his portrayal of Gus in the Netflix series Julie's Greenroom, BB on Marvel's Iron Fist, and Manny in VH1's Scream. He also officially released his first single "Goodnight Baby" on January 16, 2019, on streaming platforms under the name Tarune through an Instagram post. He has since released several other singles as a singer-songwriter, which have accumulated over 13 million streams on Spotify as of June 10, 2024. In June 2024, in an interview with Wonderland Magazine, he teased the release of his full-length album "let him cry", set to be released in Summer 2024.

== Personal life and family ==
Gioiello was born and raised in Manhattan, New York. He has a fraternal twin sister, Lucia Gioiello. He was raised by his father, Rick Gioiello who is from The Bronx. His mother, Shu-Fen Yao (姚淑芬), is of Taiwanese descent, and is the founder of Century Contemporary Dance Company. He attended Fiorello H. LaGuardia High School in New York City, and graduated the Tisch School of the Arts BFA Acting program at New York University in 2014.

== Career ==
Gioiello played actress Sandra Oh's son in the independent film Catfight which had its global premiere at TIFF in 2016. On September 13, 2017, it was announced that Gioiello was cast in the third season of the VH1 slasher television series Scream. He would star in the role of Manny. The season premiered on July 8, 2019. Later in 2019, Gioiello starred alongside his old The Carrie Diaries co-star Stefania LaVie Owen in the independent film The Cat and the Moon, which received a 78% score on Rotten Tomatoes. He later went on to voice the character of Troy in the breakout Netflix animated series Kipo and the Age of Wonderbeasts, which was released to rave reviews, receiving a 100% score for all three of its seasons. In 2023, Gioiello was cast as Jack in the Apple TV+ and A24 film Sharper, directed by Benjamin Caron. He played alongside actor Justice Smith.

== Filmography ==
=== Film ===
Year	Title	Role	Notes
2012	Social Studies	Vern	Short Film
2013	Fine Print	Adam	Short Film
2013	Into the Woods	Joey	Short Film
2015	Jack of the Red Hearts	Prep School Boy	Feature
2016	Miles	Brian	Feature
2016	Catfight	Kip Salt	Feature
2018	The Cat and the Moon	Skyler	Feature
2019	Secrets at the Lake	Jared Hale	Feature
2020	A Nightmare Wakes	Percy Shelley	Feature
2021	Dashcam	Gareth	Feature
2023	Sharper	Jack	Feature

=== Television ===
Year	Title	Role	Notes
2014	The Carrie Diaries	Scott	3 episodes
2017	Bull	Lt. Chang	Episode: "It's Classified"
2017	Julie's Greenroom	Gus	Main role
2018	Iron Fist	BB	8 episodes
2019	Scream	Manny	3 episodes
2019	The Birch	Ryan Simmington	3 episodes
2020	NOS4A2	Nat	Episode: "Bats"
2020	Kipo and the Age of Wonderbeasts	Troy (voice)	8 episodes
