= Susan Powter =

Australian-American speaker, nutritionist, trainer, and author (born 1957)

- Born: Susan Jane Powter; December 22, 1957 (age 68); Sydney, New South Wales, Australia
- Occupations: Nutritionist; motivational speaker; writer; television personality
- Years active: 1988–present
- Spouse: Nic Villarreal (m. 1982; div. 1988) Lincoln Apeland (m. 1989; div. 1995)
- Children: 3

Susan Jane Powter (born December 22, 1957) is an Australian-born American motivational speaker, nutritionist, personal trainer, and author, who rose to fame in the 1990s with her catchphrase "Stop the Insanity!", the centerpiece of her weight-loss infomercial. Powter has been described as a cross between Richard Simmons and Betty Friedan and "the Lenny Bruce of Wellness".

An advocate of a whole-foods, organic, low-fat diet, and regular cardiovascular and strength-training exercise, Powter also has condemned the diet industry. Her platinum-white close-cropped haircut, emphatic speaking manner, and habit of being barefoot while speaking in public, became trademarks of her celebrity.

== Early life ==
Powter, who was born in Sydney, Australia, on December 22, 1957, immigrated to the United States at the age of 10. She left school in 9th grade, eventually obtaining a GED. In 1980, her family relocated to Dallas, Texas. A year later, she met her first husband, Nic Villarreal; they married in 1982 and had two sons. A month after giving birth to their second son, Powter discovered that Villareal had been having an affair. The couple separated in 1986 and Powter turned to food to alleviate her stress. She went from 130 pounds to 260. Powter turned to diet books and workout tapes and found neither to be helpful. She eventually managed to slim down to 114 pounds by walking and cutting out sugar and processed foods. In Dallas, prior to her fitness career taking off, Powter worked as a topless dancer to pay her bills.

== Career ==
=== Fitness studio and Stop the Insanity! infomercial ===
With the money she inherited after the death of her mother in 1988, Powter opened her own fitness studio in Dallas, the Susan Powter Wellness Center.

In 1990, Powter approached Dallas publicity representative Rusty Robertson to promote her studio, and Robertson booked her on local radio shows. Gerald "Jerry" Frankel and his brother Richard Frankel proposed a business partnership with Powter after hearing her on the radio and visiting her studio. At the time, Jerry Frankel owned Jerell Inc., a $60 million women's apparel manufacturer. The company had been embroiled in lawsuits with clothing designer Sandra Garratt (creator of Multiples and Units) for failing to pay royalties. These were charges he denied in court; similar to Powter, the designer was driven into bankruptcy fighting the legal case.

Together, Powter and the Frankels created the Susan Powter Corporation. The Frankels invested about $800,000 in the corporation, and Gerald was the president. The corporation paid Susan a salary based on profits, which started at $4,000 a month and later increased to $30,000 a month. Net profits were split, with Susan receiving 42.5%, the Frankel brothers splitting another 42.5%, and Robertson as Powter's personal manager, receiving the remaining 15%.

In December 1992, the corporation launched the Stop the Insanity! infomercial produced by USA Direct, a subsidiary of Fingerhut, selling an $80 kit developed by Robertson and Susan, which included motivational audiotapes, low-fat recipes, and calipers to measure body fat. At its peak, they were selling about 15,000 kits per week. Powter and her infomercial would go on to win three awards at the National Infomercial Marketing Association convention.

=== Other ventures under the Susan Powter Corporation ===
The aerobics studio in Dallas continued, and the corporation added a line of exercise clothes for larger sizes.

Powter became a national celebrity and published her first book, Stop the Insanity!, in 1993. It became a national bestseller in the first week. This was quickly followed by Pocket Powter, a paperback book for which she got a $2 million advance, and a third book titled Food. She also released four exercise videos under a contract with A*Vision, a unit of Atlantic Recording.

On television, she had a two-year contract as a health consultant on Home. She began her own talk show, The Susan Powter Show, which ran for one season and was carried by almost 200 television stations. It was syndicated by Multimedia Entertainment and produced by Woody Fraser, who produced Richard Simmons' first fitness show, The Richard Simmons Show in 1980. On the show, Powter discussed nutrition and fitness, as well as other topics, with her guests.

She was also a special guest on the first episode of Space Ghost Coast to Coast, titled "Spanish Translation." The creators of the television sitcom Women of the House planned to include Powter as a cast member in their show that first aired in 1995. The series was cancelled after just one season, with Powter appearing in one episode. Powter said in 2025 that she had declined an offer to star in Kevin Costner's 1995 film Waterworld after receiving a personal phone call from Costner. "My manager was livid," Powter said. She reportedly told Costner she didn't see herself in the character she was being asked to portray.

In 1994, the corporation's gross revenues were over $50 million.

=== Lawsuits and ventures of the mid-1990s ===
By early 1994, Powter and the Frankels entered into settlement negotiations over the division of money within the Susan Powter Corporation. By October, the corporation sued Susan for breach of contract, and then she filed a counter lawsuit against the Frankels and the corporation. In January 1995, with legal fees in the millions of dollars, Susan filed for personal bankruptcy.

In the end, the legal dispute with the Frankels cost her $6.5 million. She won the rights to her image, name, and trademarks but was concerned that the business ventures were increasingly inauthentic to her main aims. She later explained that she was not using the "Stop the insanity" tagline anymore because she felt it had become too cliche.

During this time, she continued to publish books. In 1996 and 1997, she published two cookbooks, and in 1997 she also published Sober... and Staying That Way.

In 1998, Powter hosted a syndicated radio talk show. It was short-lived: For example, WSAR added her show to their line-up on April 1 in part because the station's programming had no females and Powter planned to discuss serious issues affecting women; when she said the word "vagina" in her program that same month, they labelled her a "shock jock" and abruptly pulled her off the air. That same year, Powter released Susan Powter Live!, a set of 12 audio cassettes and CDs with content from her radio show.

=== The Susan Powter Online platform and other ventures of the 2000s ===
In 2002, Powter published The Politics of Stupid, a book that encouraged women to take control of their minds and bodies from food manufacturers, corrupt governments, and fitness/diet industries. While her motto in her early years was, "Eat, breathe, and move", by 2002 it had evolved to, "Eat, breathe, move, and think".

She also launched an online platform with message boards to foster an online community, free articles and other content; it also served as a vehicle to sell her book, videos, and subscription-based multimedia e-zine.

In 2004, while on the book tour for The Politics of Stupid, she filmed Trailer Park Yoga in her Winnebago motorhome to show exercise workouts that can be done in small spaces, and released it on DVD.

From 2005 to at least 2008, Powter also offered yoga and fitness classes for Rosie O'Donnell's R Family Vacations. During this time, she also started adding a series of videos, sold in DVD packages, styled as the "Lifestyle Exchange Program". She would later include in the packages additional options such as private consultations, online cooking classes, self-esteem seminars, and recipes.

In 2008, she was living in Seattle. She started the year by remaking her website to remove the community discussion boards. She also released a revised edition of The Politics of Stupid, and prepared to release a new set of workout videos for download. She signed with a new management company: Rosie O'Donnell's KidRo Productions.

=== Current activities ===
In October 2024, Powter released her memoir, And Then Em Died... Stop the Insanity! A Memoir. A documentary about her life, Stop the Insanity: Finding Susan Powter, co-produced by actress Jamie Lee Curtis, and directed by Zeberiah Newman, was released in 2025.

== Personal life ==
In 1982, Powter married Nic Villarreal and they had two sons: Damien (in 1983) and Kiel (in 1984). They divorced in 1988. In 1989, she met Lincoln Apeland in a music store and married him weeks later. They divorced in 1995. She adopted her third son, Gabriel, who was born in 1998.

In 1993, The New York Times said Powter's then current living situation could be the basis of a sitcom. So her children could have a close relationship with their father, while living in Dallas she financially supported her first husband and rented a duplex where her first husband, their shared children, and her second husband lived. Similarly, when she relocated to California, she rented a nearby apartment for her first husband.

Powter later came out as a lesbian, and in a 2004 interview with Curve magazine, she described herself as a "radical feminist housewife". That year, she dated Animal Prufrock and lived in Northampton, Massachusetts. She dated comedian Jessica Kirson in 2008.

By 2010, she was living off-the-grid in an earthship-style home in Taos, NM, and raising her youngest son.

In October 2024, Powter revealed that due to the series of lawsuits in the mid-1990s and poor financial planning, she had been left virtually destitute, living in an RV and delivering food for Grubhub and Uber Eats. After a health scare, she filed for Medicaid. At 66, she lived in a low-income senior community and applied for Social Security.

== Written works ==
- Stop the Insanity! (1993) ISBN 0-671-79598-8
- The Pocket Powter (1994) ISBN 0-671-89456-0
- Food (1995) ISBN 0-671-89225-8
- C'mon America, Let's Eat (1996)
- Sober…and Staying That Way: The Missing Link in the Cure for Alcoholism (1997)
- Hey, Mom! I'm Hungry!: Great-Tasting, Low-Fat, Easy Recipes to Feed Your Family (1997)
- The Politics of Stupid (2002)
- And Then Em Died -- Stop the Insanity!: A Memoir. Susan Powter. 2024. ISBN 979-8-3434-6724-6.

== Home media ==
=== Audio cassettes and CDs ===
Cassettes and CDs released in the 1998 Susan Powter Live! set:

- Volume 1, Whole Foods
- Volume 2, Fat Makes You Fat
- Volume 3, Body Image
- Volume 4, Working Within Your Fitness Level
- Volume 5, Preservatives and Your Kids
- Volume 6, What Makes You Get Up and Exercise?
- Volume 7, Artificial Sweeteners
- Volume 8, Metabolic Rates
- Volume 9, Quality of Life
- Volume 10, Stretching and Lengthening
- Volume 11, Food Recipes
- Volume 12, Being Your Own Physician

=== Video cassettes ===
- Moving With Susan (1992)
- Shopping with Susan (1993)
- Lean, Strong and Healthy with Susan Powter (1993)
- Abs and Oils (1993)
- Building Strength with Susan Powter (1994)
- Burn Fat & Get Fit with Susan Powter (1994)

=== DVDs ===
DVDs released in 2006 with the program name Susan Powter Lifestyle Ex-Change:

- Volume 1, Burn Fat
- Volume 2, Lean Muscle Mass
- Volume 3, Circuit Training Upper
- Volume 4, Circuit Training Lower
- Volume 5, Yoga
- Volume 6, Body Work
- Volume 7, Sprint Energy
- Volume 8, Yoga Step
- Fitness Stretch
- Men's Conditioning Volume 1
- Men's Conditioning Volume 2
- Weight Loss Program - Motivation Volume 1
- Weight Loss Program - Motivation Volume 2

== Filmography ==
Year	Title	Role	Notes	Refs.
1993	Shopping with Susan	Self	Video	
1994–2004	Space Ghost Coast to Coast	Self	1994 Episode: "Spanish Translation"; 2004 Episode: "Live At the Fillmore" (Archive Footage)	
1994	The Susan Powter Show	Self	Television series	
1994	The Fresh Prince of Bel-Air	Self	Episode: "Will Steps Out"	
1995	Women of the House	Representative Kirby Seizmore	Episode: "Dear Diary"	
1996	Diagnosis: Murder	Janet Block	Episode: "Murder by the Book"	
2004	I Love the 90s	Self		
2007	The Simple Life	Self	2 episodes	
2008	RuPaul's Drag Race	Self	Episode: "Totally Leotarded"; Guest judge	
2025	Stop the Insanity: Finding Susan Powter	Self	Documentary	
