= Zachary Booth =

American actor (born 1983)

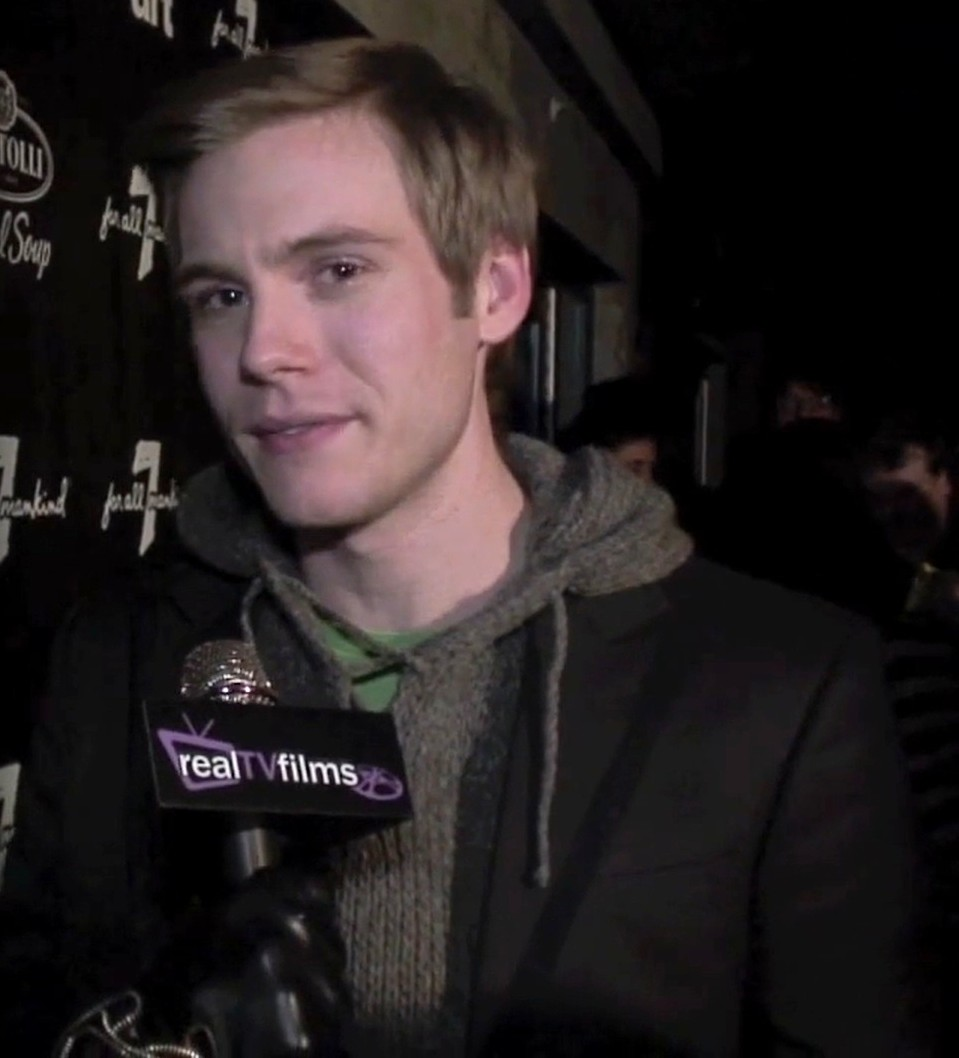
- Booth in 2012
- Born: 1983 (age 42–43)
- Education: University of Michigan (BFA)
- Occupation: Actor

Zachary Booth (born 1983) is an American actor. He appeared in several productions with the Peterborough Players in Peterborough, New Hampshire, before starring in The N's What Goes On and on FX's Damages. Booth is a 2004 BFA graduate of the University of Michigan.

== Career ==
Booth had supporting roles in the films Assassination of a High School President alongside Mischa Barton, and The Marc Pease Experience with Ben Stiller. In 2009, he had a role in the Ang Lee film Taking Woodstock as a member of a hippie naturist group.

In 2008, Booth co-starred alongside Victoria Clark, Michelle Park and Jonathan Groff in Prayer for My Enemy, a play by Craig Lucas at the Off-Broadway theater Playwrights Horizons in New York City. During the same year, he played the role of Gary in Nick and Norah's Infinite Playlist.

In September 2010, he starred in the New York production of the new Edward Albee play Me, Myself & I also at Playwrights Horizons.

He played a lead role in Ira Sachs' Keep the Lights On. The film opened on September 7, 2012.

From 2018 to 2021, Booth played Horace Gilmer in To Kill a Mockingbird at the Shubert Theatre on Broadway.

== Personal life ==
Booth is gay. "As an actor who has been embraced by the queer community, I can't hide who I am, my truth, and still benefit from that", he said in an interview to Logo TV.

== Filmography ==
=== Film ===
Year	Title	Role	Notes
2007	The Life Before Her Eyes	Boy swimming	Uncredited
2008	Assassination of a High School President	Rocky Raccoon	
2008	Venice	Levi	Short film
2008	Nick and Nora's Infinite Playlist	Gary	
2009	Taking Woodstock	Earthlight Player	
2009	The Marc Pease Experience	Craig	
2010	White Irish Drinkers	Todd	
2011	The Beaver	Jared	
2011	Dark Horse	Justin	
2012	Keep the Lights On	Paul Lucy	
2012	Allegiance	Carroll	
2012	The Blue Eyes	Paul	
2013	Big Words	Ben Shine	
2013	Syrup	Chet	
2013	The Blue Box	Jack	Short film
2014	Never	Denim	
2014	Last Weekend	Theo Green	
2015	Ava's Possessions	Roger	
2017	After Louie	Braeden Devries	
2017	The Revival	Daniel	
2020	T11 Incomplete	Jack	
2020	Boys on Film 20: Heaven Can Wait		
2021	Dashcam	Tim	
2023	Maestro	Mendy Wager	

=== Television ===
Year	Title	Role	Notes
2006	Law & Order: Special Victims Unit	Trevor Olsen	Episode: "Influence"
2007–2012	Damages	Michael Hewes	30 episodes
2007	What Goes On	Ethan Knowles	10 episodes
2008	New Amsterdam	Roosevelt/Alex Spoor	Episode: "Legacy"
2010	Royal Pains	Oliver Ambrose	2 episodes
2012	NYC 22	Gabe Atkins	Episode: "Jumpers"
2013	White Collar	Patrick Wolcott	Episode: "Master Plan"
2013	Elementary	Silas Cole	Episode: "Tremors"
2015	Blue Bloods	Lorenzo Colt	Episode: "All the News That's Fit to Click"
2015	Person of Interest	Chase Patterson	Episode: "Terra Incognita"
2015	South of Hell	David Abascal	8 episodes
2017–2018	The Good Fight	Jerry Warshofsky	3 episodes
2019	The Family	Luke	3 episodes
2019	Prodigal Son	Liam	Episode: "Annihilator"
2022	Bull	Noah Sinclair	Episode: "Dark Horse"
2025	The Lowdown	Elijah	3 episodes
