= Nico Carney =

Stand-up comedian, writer, and actor

- Born: October 14, 1997 (age 29)
- Occupations: Stand-up comedian; writer; actor
- Years active: 2021–present
- Known for: Stand-up performances
- Website: www.nicocarney.com

Nico Carney (born October 14, 1997) is an American stand-up comedian, writer, and actor. He is known for his stand-up material about his experiences as a transgender man. In 2024, he made his late-night stand-up debut on Late Night with Seth Meyers and was named to Vulture's list of "The Comedians You Should and Will Know." His debut stand-up special WEE LAD released on YouTube on October 15, 2026.

== Early life and education ==
Carney grew up in Savannah, Georgia. He attended Wake Forest University, where he played NCAA Division I women's soccer and came out as a lesbian in 2018. While in college, he was involved in sketch comedy. After moving to New York City in 2021, he began his social and medical transition.

== Career ==
=== Stand-up comedy ===
Carney began performing stand-up comedy in 2021 in Savannah, Georgia, before relocating to New York City. His stand-up material draws on his experiences as a transgender man, growing up in Georgia, and the process of transitioning.

In 2022, he was selected for the inaugural Netflix "Introducing..." showcase at the Netflix Is a Joke Festival. The following year, he was named a Just for Laughs New Face in the stand-up category. In 2024, Carney made his late-night debut on Late Night with Seth Meyers.

Carney has supported Jonathan Van Ness on tour and headlined shows at the New York Comedy Festival and Moontower Comedy Festival in Austin, Texas. In March 2025, he was a featured comedian in the 2025 CBS Showcase, a stand-up event marking the initiative's 20th anniversary. On October 15, 2026 Carney released his debut stand-up special WEE LAD on YouTube.

=== Television and podcasts ===
Carney co-hosts the podcast and monthly live show Boys Club with comedian Conor Janda at Club Cumming in the East Village. The show headlined at the 2022 New York Comedy Festival. In 2025 Carney and Janda released a webseries called Boys Club, spanning five episodes, on YouTube.

Carney has appeared on Comedy Central's The Gag. He and Janda are developing a half-hour comedy pilot titled Boys with Scott King supervising for Imagine Entertainment.

=== Film ===
In 2023 Carney starred in the short film Stick Bug (2023) as one of the two main characters. He made his feature film debut in She's the He (2025), an indie comedy directed by Siobhan McCarthy, in which he plays the role of Alex. The film premiered at the SXSW Film Festival in March 2025. A review in Variety praised Carney's performance, writing that he "delivers such an enormously funny performance that he swallows the movie whole."

== Reception and recognition ==
Carney was profiled as part of Vulture's 2024 list of "The Comedians You Should and Will Know." In December 2024, Deadline named him one of "The Future of Funny: 15 Comedians Ready to Break Out in 2025."
