= Kieron Moore (English actor) =

English actor (born 1996)

- Born: 23 December 1996 (age 29); Manchester, England, UK
- Occupation: Actor
- Years active: 2019–present

Kieron Moore (born 23 December 1996) is an English actor and former boxer. On television, he is known for his roles in the Peacock series Vampire Academy (2022), the ITVX series Code of Silence (2025–) and the Netflix series Boots (2025). His debut film debut in Blue Film (2025), a gay psychological thriller. He was named a 2025 Screen International Star of Tomorrow.

== Early life and education ==
Kieron Moore was born on 23 December 1996 in Manchester. He comes from a Polish and Russian family.

He studied acting at the Manchester School of Acting. In addition to acting, Moore also writes poetry and has shared that it's an important part of his creative life, with plans to publish a book of his verses. His transition from boxer to actor and how his physical and emotional past influenced his approach to acting are frequent topics of conversation.

== Career ==
Moore competed in boxing for 12 years, before deciding to pursue an acting career at the age of 21.

He made his acting debut in a 2019 episode of the series Emmerdale. In 2021, Moore was cast in a lead role for Peacock's television series Vampire Academy, and landed a role in Apple TV+'s war drama miniseries Masters of the Air.

Moore co-starred alongside Miles Heizer and Vera Farmiga in the Netflix series Boots which premiered on 9 October 2025.

== Filmography ==
=== Film ===
Year	Title	Role	Notes
2025	Blue Film	Aaron Eagle / Alex McConnell	
2026	Vampire Carnival	Eric	

=== Television ===
Year	Title	Role	Notes
2019	Emmerdale	Nav	1 episode
2021	Sex Education	Dylan	2 episodes
2022	The Sandman	Crispin	1 episode
2022	Vampire Academy	Dimitri Belikov	Main role, 10 episodes
2024	Masters of the Air	Sgt. Clifford Starkey	Miniseries, 3 episodes
2025	Code of Silence	Liam "Hoodie" Barlow	Main role, 6 episodes
2025	Boots	Nicholas Slovacek	Main role, 8 episodes
