= Westhampton (film) =

2025 Independent Feature Film

- Directed by: Christian Nilsson
- Written by: Christian Nilsson
- Produced by: Christian Nilsson; Saraleah Cogan; Rob Hinderliter; Alex Robbins; Terence Krey; Eric Tabach; Dave Brick
- Starring: Finn Wittrock; RJ Mitte; Jake Weary; Amy Forsyth; Tovah Feldshuh; Dan Lauria
- Cinematography: Dave Brick
- Edited by: Terence Krey
- Music by: Nicholas Marks
- Production company: TXE
- Distributed by: Obscured Releasing
- Release dates: June 7, 2025 (Tribeca Festival); July 10, 2026 (United States)
- Running time: 94 minutes
- Country: United States
- Language: English

Westhampton is a 2025 American drama film directed by Christian Nilsson and written by Nilsson from a story by Nilsson and Terence Krey. It stars Finn Wittrock as Tom Bell, a damaged filmmaker haunted by a fatal car accident he caused in high school. Years later, Tom returns to his Long Island hometown, where he must confront the former friends whose lives were altered by the tragedy and a community that regards him as a pariah. The narrative alternates between Tom's homecoming and the black-and-white film he made about the accident, gradually revealing that the events unfolded differently from the version he placed onscreen.

The film premiered in the Spotlight Narrative section of the Tribeca Festival on June 7, 2025. It subsequently received the Jury Award for Directing at the Stony Brook Film Festival and was named Best Feature at the CineSol Film Festival. Obscured Releasing acquired the North American distribution rights and released the film in select United States theaters on July 10, 2026, followed by a digital release on July 31. Critical response was generally favorable, with particular praise for Wittrock's performance, Dave Brick's cinematography and Nilsson's writing and direction.

== Plot ==
Filmmaker Tom Bell remains haunted by a car accident he caused during high school that killed his girlfriend, Beth, and devastated the lives of their closest friends. He later turned the experience into his debut feature, Westhampton, a semi-autobiographical film that brought him professional recognition but presented a substantially altered version of the tragedy.

Now, years later, Tom learns that his childhood home has been sold and that he must retrieve the belongings stored inside. For the first time since the accident, he returns to the real Westhampton.

Tom arrives at the house and discovers that he is locked out. His attempt to obtain a key draws him through the town and back into contact with people he has spent years avoiding. Among them are Dickie, Beth's older brother and Tom's former friend, and Avery, Beth's much younger sister, whose resemblance to Beth unsettles him. His return also attracts the attention of other residents who resent both his role in the accident and his decision to fictionalize their experiences.

Scenes from Tom's black-and-white film are intercut with his present-day encounters. As the differences between the two narratives emerge, it becomes apparent that Tom reshaped the people and events surrounding the accident into a story that made his own actions easier to endure. His effort to collect the physical remnants of his past becomes a broader confrontation with the harm he caused and with people who are unwilling to offer him forgiveness simply because he has returned to seek it.

== Cast ==
- Finn Wittrock as Tom Bell
- RJ Mitte as Fitz
- Jake Weary as Dickie
- Amy Forsyth as Avery
- Roxanne Schiebergen as Beth
- Sam Strike as Jay
- Mary Mallen as Kim
- Joy Suprano as Nicole
- Dan Lauria as Mr. Romney
- Tovah Feldshuh as Mrs. Lucas
- Ritchie Coster as the Film Chair
- Luke Slattery as Movie Tom
- Chris Gray as Movie Dickie
- Emily Jayne as Movie Beth
- Gabrielle Manna as Movie Kim
- Joshua Screen as Movie Jay

== Production ==
=== Development ===
Nilsson began developing Westhampton around 2017. The project was initially conceived during a period in which independent coming-of-age dramas were receiving greater industry attention. RJ Mitte became involved in 2018, and much of the eventual cast was attached to an earlier version of the production.

After several years of unsuccessful financing efforts, Nilsson and the producers reworked the film for independent production in 2023. The story was reduced in scale while retaining its central characters, themes and film-within-a-film structure. Members of the previously attached cast subsequently returned for the revised production, with Finn Wittrock also serving as an executive producer.

=== Principal photography ===
The film was made under SAG-AFTRA's Ultra Low Budget Agreement. It was also approved for a SAG-AFTRA Interim Agreement during the 2023 actors’ strike, allowing its performers to work on the production while the strike remained in effect.

Filming took place in New York and used the actual Westhampton area as the story's setting. Nilsson said that shooting in the real community offered both practical benefits and a greater sense of authenticity, allowing the town's streets, houses and off-season atmosphere to become part of Tom's uneasy relationship with his past.

Nilsson and cinematographer Dave Brick established distinct visual styles for the film's two narrative levels. Tom's present-day return is photographed in color, using restrained compositions, long wide shots and limited camera movement. His fictionalized film is presented in black-and-white 16 mm, with more pronounced movement and a dreamlike quality that reflects his romanticized reconstruction of the past.

== Release ==
Westhampton had its world premiere on June 7, 2025, in the Spotlight Narrative section of the Tribeca Festival. It screened at the Stony Brook Film Festival in July, where Nilsson received the Jury Award for Directing. and was subsequently included in the Twin Cities Film Fest program. In December 2025, it was named Best Feature at the CineSol Film Festival.

Obscured Releasing acquired the film's North American distribution rights in December 2025.The film opened theatrically on July 10, 2026, including engagements at Village East by Angelika in New York and the Laemmle Royal in Los Angeles. It was released through digital platforms in the United States on July 31.

== Reception ==
Critical response was generally favorable. As of August 7, 2026, Rotten Tomatoes reported an approval rating of 75% based on 12 reviews.

Wittrock's performance received consistent praise. Glenn Kenny of The New York Times commended his portrayal of a filmmaker who attempts to use art to escape personal accountability, while The Contending described the performance as a career best. The publication also praised Nilsson's use of the black-and-white film-within-the-film to distinguish Tom's version of the past from the experiences of those around him.

Nilsson's screenplay and direction were also positively received. Loud and Clear Reviews called the film a strongly written examination of accountability and praised the complexity of its central character. ScreenAnarchy highlighted its dry humor, bittersweet tone, wide compositions and refusal to offer simple resolutions, while Next Best Picture praised the film as thoughtful and resonant and singled out Brick's cinematography.

More reserved reviews focused on the familiarity of the homecoming narrative. Stephen Farber of The Hollywood Reporter praised Wittrock but described the character study as comparatively thin, while other reviewers found some dramatic relationships less developed than the film's central exploration of guilt, authorship and forgiveness.

== Accolades ==
Year	Organization	Category	Recipient	Result
2025	Tribeca Festival	Spotlight Narrative	Westhampton	Selection
2025	Stony Brook Film Festival	Jury Award for Directing	Christian Nilsson	Won
2025	CineSol Film Festival	Best Feature Film	Westhampton	Won
