= Dashcam (2021 thriller film) =

2021 American thriller film

- Directed by: Christian Nilsson
- Written by: Christian Nilsson
- Produced by: Andrew van den Houten; Han Soto; Christian Nilsson; Eric Tabach; Saraleah Cogan; Rob Hinderliter; Alex Robbins
- Starring: Eric Tabach; Giorgia Whigham; Larry Fessenden; Zachary Booth; Guillian Gioiello; Noa Fisher
- Cinematography: Dave Brick
- Edited by: Terence Krey
- Music by: Nicholas Marks
- Production company: TXE
- Distributed by: Kamikaze Dogfight; Gravitas Ventures
- Release date: 2021
- Country: United States
- Language: English

Dashcam is a 2021 American psychological thriller written and directed by Christian Nilsson. It stars YouTuber Eric Tabach with Giorgia Whigham, Larry Fessenden, Zachary Booth, Giullian Gioiello and Noa Fisher in supporting roles. The film merges "screenlife" with conventional filmmaking to allow the audience to get into the head of the protagonist.

The film premiered at the 2021 Popcorn Frights Film Festival on August 16, 2021 and was released by Gravitas Ventures in the US on October 19, 2021.

== Premise ==
Jake (Tabach) is a reclusive video editor at a local news channel who fantasizes about becoming a reporter. While editing a piece on a routine traffic stop that resulted in the death of a police officer and a major political official, Jake is inadvertently sent dash cam video evidence that tells a completely different story. Working alone from his small apartment in NYC, Jake uses his skills as an editor to analyze the footage and figure out the truth behind what actually happened.

== Cast ==
- Eric Tabach as Jake Caul
- Giorgia Whigham as Mara
- Larry Fessenden as Lieberman
- Zachary Booth as Tim
- Giullian Gioiello as Gareth
- Noa Fisher as Rachel
- Rich Vience as Meyers
- Scott Aiello as Woods
- Jacob A. Ware as Dispatch

== Release ==
Dashcam premiered at the Popcorn Frights Film Festival on August 16, 2021 and was released by Gravitas Ventures in the US on October 19, 2021.

The release of the film caused some confusion as it shares its title with another 2021 film, Dashcam, which premiered a month later on September 13, 2021, at the 2021 Toronto International Film Festival.

== Reception ==
On Rotten Tomatoes, the film has an approval rating of 89% based on reviews from 9 critics. Alexandra Heller-Nicholas of The Blue Lenses wrote: "Dashcam is an extraordinary low-budget political thriller that does a lot with a little, and is a masterclass that sometimes, having the guts to punch above its weight can pay off just through sheer audacity alone." Another wrote, "Working with miniscule [sic] budget, writer/director Christian Nilsson upstages his better-financed moneyed counterparts with this gripping political thriller."

The New York Times included Dashcam on its list of "Five Horror Films To Stream" for the month of November and wrote the film is "at its creepiest when just audio and video clips, and Jake’s surgical adjustments to them, steer the paranoia-driven story. Over 82 unnerving minutes, Nilsson squeezes big suspense out of seemingly throwaway moments, as when Jake just sits and listens to audio tracks."

== See also ==
- List of American films of 2021
- List of films featuring surveillance
