= Abductions =

- The White Lotus episode
- Episode no.: Season 2 Episode 6
- Directed by: Mike White
- Written by: Mike White
- Cinematography by: Xavier Grobet
- Editing by: Heather Persons
- Original air date: December 4, 2022
- Running time: 60 minutes

Guest appearances
- Paolo Camilli as Hugo; Bruno Gouery as Didier; Eleonora Romandini as Isabella; Francesco Zecca as Matteo

Episode chronology
← Previous "That's Amore"	Next → "Arrivederci"
- The White Lotus season 2

"Abductions" is the sixth episode of the second season of the American black comedy drama anthology television series The White Lotus. It is the twelfth overall episode of the series and was written and directed by series creator Mike White. It originally aired on HBO on December 4, 2022.

The series follows the guests and employees of the fictional White Lotus resort chain. The season is set on Taormina, Sicily, and follows the new guests, which include Ethan and his wife Harper; Cameron and his wife Daphne; Bert, his son Dominic, and grandson Albie; and Tanya and her husband Greg. The season explores the characters' conflicts, along with the short-tempered manager Valentina. In the episode, Ethan's marriage continues to fall apart, while the Di Grassos visit their blood relatives.

According to Nielsen Media Research, the episode was seen by an estimated 0.684 million household viewers and gained a 0.10 ratings share among adults aged 18–49. The episode received extremely positive reviews from critics, who praised its dark tone, revelations, writing and performances.

== Plot ==
Ethan (Will Sharpe) confronts Harper (Aubrey Plaza) for humiliating him by discussing their sex life in front of Cameron (Theo James) and Daphne (Meghann Fahy). They discuss their mutual lack of attraction, with Harper asking Ethan if he still desires her. Ethan is also confronted by Lucia (Simona Tabasco) and Mia (Beatrice Grannò) as neither he nor Cameron fully paid for their services, which is witnessed by Harper.

Before Dominic (Michael Imperioli), Bert (F. Murray Abraham) and Albie (Adam DiMarco) leave to meet their relatives in their ancestral village of Testa dell'Acqua, Albie suggests that Lucia accompanies them as their translator. Lucia briefly stops to speak to a hotel employee and then joins the family. On the way, Lucia notices that they are being followed by Alessio. Not wanting to cause trouble, Lucia agrees to leave with him. Without their translator, the Di Grassos meet their Italian relatives, who respond with suspicion and hostility. They return to the resort, where Bert praises Mia for playing the piano. After the performance, Valentina (Sabrina Impacciatore), alone on her birthday and having learned that Isabella, a concierge she was interested in, is engaged to Rocco, takes Mia up on her offer and they have sex in one of the vacant guest rooms.

Ethan witnesses Harper flirting with Cameron and becomes increasingly convinced she has cheated on him. Albie is visited by Lucia, who explains that she owes money to Alessio.

Quentin (Tom Hollander) hosts a party at his house, where he introduces Tanya (Jennifer Coolidge) to his cocaine dealer, Niccolò (Stefano Gianino), whom he implies works for the Mafia and whom Tanya notices is carrying a gun. Drunk and under the influence of cocaine, Tanya sees an old photo of Quentin with a man resembling her husband Greg before sleeping with Niccolò.

Elsewhere, Portia (Haley Lu Richardson) becomes increasingly tired of Jack's (Leo Woodall) drunken antics. Jack states Quentin and his friends have spent all their money on their luxuries, but some new money will soon be coming in. He cryptically implies Quentin rescued him from dire circumstances.

== Production ==
=== Development ===
The episode was written and directed by series creator Mike White. This was White's twelfth writing and directorial credit for the series.

== Reception ==
=== Viewers ===
In its original American broadcast, "Abductions" was seen by an estimated 0.684 million household viewers with a 0.10 in the 18-49 demographics. This means that 0.11 percent of all households with televisions watched the episode. This was a slight increase from the previous episode, which was watched by 0.641 million household viewers with a 0.11 in the 18-49 demographics.

=== Critical reviews ===
"Abductions" received extremely positive reviews from critics. The review aggregator website Rotten Tomatoes reported a 100% approval rating for the episode, based on 2 reviews.

Manuel Betancourt of The A.V. Club gave the episode an "A" grade and wrote, "I always knew this season of The White Lotus would belong to Aubrey Plaza. But I was hardly ready for the way in which her Harper would take a chokehold on this HBO anthology series. Plaza, who's long been known and often underestimated because of her uncanny ability to channel deadpan 'evil hag' energy, has here yet again proven why she's one of the most fascinating performers around."

Tom Smyth of Vulture gave the episode a 4 star rating out of 5 and wrote, "Few shows welcome rabid theorizing more than The White Lotus does, between its promise of impending death and every episode's ominous ambiguity. If you've been on the internet at any point over the last five weeks you've probably seen a lot of those theories, because everybody's watching this show with a suspicious eye. And while we've had our guard up this whole time, it seems like our characters have finally caught up — reading into every little interaction and developing suspicions of their own." Paul Dailly of TV Fanatic gave the episode a perfect 5 star rating out of 5 and wrote, "'Abductions' was a perfect hour of this HBO drama because it continued to peel away at these individuals on their vacation in Italy."

Henry Wong of Esquire wrote, "It's been such a pleasure to watch these various couples mess around, break up, and get together, that it will be difficult to watch next week's finale. Still, you have to check out sometime." Shawn Laib of Den of Geek gave the episode a 4 star rating out of 5 and wrote, "We still have hardly an idea who will remain dead or alive going into next week, but it certainly seems like the lack of communication between these four characters will have a lot to do with their fates."
