= That's Amore (The White Lotus) =

- The White Lotus episode
- Episode no.: Season 2 Episode 5
- Directed by: Mike White
- Written by: Mike White
- Cinematography by: Xavier Grobet
- Editing by: John M. Valerio
- Original release date: November 27, 2022
- Running time: 59 minutes

Guest appearances
- Federico Ferrante as Rocco; Eleonora Romandini as Isabella; Paolo Camilli as Hugo; Bruno Gouery as Didier; Francesco Zecca as Matteo

Episode chronology
← Previous "In the Sandbox"	Next → "Abductions"
- The White Lotus season 2

"That's Amore" is the fifth episode of the second season of the American black comedy drama anthology television series The White Lotus. It is the eleventh overall episode of the series and was written and directed by series creator Mike White. It originally aired on HBO on November 27, 2022.

The series follows the guests and employees of the fictional White Lotus resort chain. The season is set on Taormina, Sicily, and follows the new guests, which include Ethan and his wife Harper; Cameron and his wife Daphne; Bert, his son Dominic, and grandson Albie; and Tanya and her husband Greg. The season explores the characters' conflicts, along with the short-tempered manager Valentina. In the episode, Quentin takes Tanya and Portia to accompany him to Palermo, while Harper discovers what happened on Ethan's and Cameron's night.

According to Nielsen Media Research, the episode was seen by an estimated 0.641 million household viewers and gained a 0.11 ratings share among adults aged 18–49. The episode received mostly positive reviews from critics, who praised the character development, performances (particularly Aubrey Plaza) and ending.

== Plot ==
Harper (Aubrey Plaza) leaves the condom wrapper by the bathroom sink for Ethan (Will Sharpe) to find when he wakes. When he asks her about it, she says she found it on the couch. He finally reveals the details of his partying, confessing that Cameron (Theo James) had sex with two prostitutes. Ethan swears that while he was drunk and on MDMA, and one of the girls tried to kiss him, he never had sex with either of the girls. Although Harper is angry that he lied, she accepts his apology.

After having sex, Lucia (Simona Tabasco) asks for payment from Albie (Adam DiMarco), who until then was unaware she is a prostitute. When he asks Dominic (Michael Imperioli) if he can go to the bank, Dominic deduces his interest in Lucia and tells her to stay away from Albie, as he previously slept with her. Ethan and Harper join Cameron and Daphne (Meghann Fahy) on a wine-tasting trip near Mount Etna, with Harper hinting at their night's events. During their talk, Ethan brings up "mimetic desire", feeling that Cameron wanted to seduce all the girls Ethan was interested in at college to prove his superiority. Cameron tells Ethan of his annoyance at telling Harper about their night, but Ethan says he had no choice. During dinner, a drunker Harper opens up about her sex life, humiliating Ethan. Cameron, sensing interest from Harper, grasps her thigh behind the table but she quietly swats him away.

Quentin (Tom Hollander) invites Tanya (Jennifer Coolidge) and Portia (Haley Lu Richardson) to stay at his home in Palermo, and Tanya accepts. While Portia and Jack (Leo Woodall) leave to explore the town, Quentin takes Tanya to see a performance of Madama Butterfly at the Teatro Massimo. During dinner, Dominic finally opens up to Bert (F. Murray Abraham), blaming Bert’s affairs for his condition and only thinking about himself; Bert rejects blame and insists that he and his late wife (Dominic’s mother) loved each other. In Giuseppe’s absence, Mia (Beatrice Grannò) tries to get Valentina (Sabrina Impacciatore) to hire her as the new lounge pianist. When she refuses, Mia offers to exchange sex for the job, deducing that she is a lesbian. Under Mia’s premise of helping a woman, Valentina finally allows her to play, at least until Giuseppe recovers.

While going out with Albie, Lucia is approached by a man, whom she identifies as Alessio, her pimp, but she refuses to elaborate. They return to his room to have sex, despite Lucia having said she doesn’t want payment from Albie. That night, Tanya awakens and decides to walk the house. She stumbles upon a room, where she sees Jack having sex with Quentin. Shocked, she quietly leaves.

== Production ==
=== Development ===
The episode was written and directed by series creator Mike White. This was White's eleventh writing and directorial credit for the series.

== Reception ==
=== Viewers ===
In its original American broadcast, "That's Amore" was seen by an estimated 0.641 million household viewers with a 0.11 in the 18-49 demographics. This means that 0.11 percent of all households with televisions watched the episode. This was a 54% increase from the previous episode, which was watched by 0.416 million household viewers with a 0.07 in the 18-49 demographics.

=== Critical reviews ===
"That's Amore" received extremely positive reviews from critics. The review aggregator website Rotten Tomatoes reported a 100% approval rating for the episode, based on 2 reviews.

Manuel Betancourt of The A.V. Club gave the episode a "B+" grade and wrote, "Have you picked up your jaw from the floor? That's where mine was when Mike White finally revealed the twist we all should've seen coming. After all, for a 'naughty nephew,' Jack was, perhaps, too odd of a guest in Quentin's gay-filled yacht and palazzo. And if the impact of that final scene gets to be blunted by the way we get to refer to it as 'this season's rimming reveal,' there's no denying writer-director Mike White made sure to make it as operatic (and eye-searing) as he could be. Almost as if he'd heard complaints about the way that season one Armond moment was a tad too demure for the sex position it was depicting. Because boy did he deliver on this front (or, back, I guess) this time around."

Tom Smyth of Vulture gave the episode a perfect 5 star rating out of 5 and wrote, "We've reached that point in a White Lotus season where shit is hitting the fan, and it's fair to assume that most of our guests have probably perused Expedia once or twice already for early flights home. Questions are finally being answered and our characters' secrets are being revealed, not just to us but to each other. And at this resort, information is yet another form of power, so with every chaotic secret exposed, we're watching the power dynamics shift more and more." Paul Dailly of TV Fanatic gave the episode a 4.75 star rating out of 5 and wrote, "Well, that was unexpected. 'That's Amore' sent all of the storylines in exciting directions, preparing us for the final two episodes of the season."

Henry Wong of Esquire wrote, "Was anyone expecting the second season of The White Lotus to play out, so often, like a romantic comedy? There are so many couples to root for, each charming and messed-up in their own ways: Albie and Lucia, Ethan and Harper, Jack and Portia. In this episode alone, there were tearful goodbyes in hotel corridors, swimming pool kisses, jaunty string music. It's been a delightful, surprising change of pace from show creator Mike White." Shawn Laib of Den of Geek gave the episode a 4 star rating out of 5 and wrote, "The cliffhanger entering next week is one of the oddest things I've ever seen on TV, a peak into what appears to be a sex scene between Jack and Quentin that Tanya becomes privy to. Incest is something that HBO has never been afraid to show but this act comes completely out of nowhere. The purpose it serves could make or break the final two episodes of the season."
