= Italian Dream =

- The White Lotus episode
- Episode no.: Season 2 Episode 2
- Directed by: Mike White
- Written by: Mike White
- Cinematography by: Xavier Grobet
- Editing by: Heather Persons
- Original release date: November 6, 2022
- Running time: 54 minutes

Guest appearances
- Federico Ferrante as Rocco; Eleonora Romandini as Isabella; Federico Scribani Rossi as Giuseppe

Episode chronology
← Previous "Ciao"	Next → "Bull Elephants"
- The White Lotus season 2

"Italian Dream" is the second episode of the second season of the American black comedy drama anthology television series The White Lotus. It is the eighth overall episode of the series and was written and directed by series creator Mike White. It originally aired on HBO on November 6, 2022.

The series follows the guests and employees of the fictional White Lotus resort chain. The season is set on Taormina, Sicily, and follows the new guests, which include Ethan and his wife Harper; Cameron and his wife Daphne; Bert, his son Dominic, and grandson Albie; and Tanya and her husband Greg. The season explores the characters' conflicts, along with the short-tempered manager Valentina. In the episode, Dominic helps Lucia and Mia in getting into the hotel, while Harper wonders about her status with Ethan.

According to Nielsen Media Research, the episode was seen by an estimated 0.421 million household viewers and gained a 0.08 ratings share among adults aged 18–49. The episode received very positive reviews from critics, who praised the performances, character development and cinematography.

== Plot ==
Harper (Aubrey Plaza) walks in on Ethan (Will Sharpe) masturbating to internet porn, suggesting their sexual chemistry is lacking. After sleeping with Lucia (Simona Tabasco), Dominic (Michael Imperioli) gets her and Mia (Beatrice Grannò) registered as guests, frustrating Valentina (Sabrina Impacciatore). Lucia and Mia enjoy the hotel, charging clothes and alcohol to Dominic's room.

Greg (Jon Gries) rents a Vespa to drive with Tanya (Jennifer Coolidge) as part of her romantic Italian fantasy. That evening, Greg tells Tanya he has to return to the U.S. for work. Tanya is devastated and sobs dramatically, certain that Greg no longer loves her.

Portia (Haley Lu Richardson) has lunch with Dominic, Bert (F. Murray Abraham) and Albie (Adam DiMarco), and Bert invites her to join them for a tour at the ancient theatre of Taormina. The tour proves to be uncomfortable as Bert continues embarrassing Dominic and making uncouth remarks. During dinner, Ethan and Harper are once again frustrated when Cameron (Theo James) and Daphne (Meghann Fahy) gloat about their sex life.

Mia encounters Giuseppe (Federico Scribani Rossi) again, and decides to prove her skills by playing the piano and singing, which is met with applause. Bert also talks with Dominic over his infidelities, chiding him for not properly shielding his wife from it as Bert supposedly did. At dinner with Portia, Albie explains to her that Dominic's numerous infidelities are the main reason why his mother and sister did not accompany them to Italy. Despite having signed a non-disclosure agreement with Tanya, Portia opens up about her past. Albie expresses romantic interest; when he asks if he can kiss her, she allows it. However, he then abruptly says good night after the kiss, leaving Portia confused.

Harper opens up to Ethan that the encounters with Cameron made her reconsider her actions, and promises to be more active with him during their vacation. She suggests sex, but he says he is tired. That night, Dominic is visited by Lucia and Mia. Despite Dominic wanting to control his sexual addiction, he eventually accepts their offer of a threesome. Tanya wakes to see Greg talking quietly on the phone, saying "I love you" to an unknown person.

== Production ==
=== Development ===
The episode was written and directed by series creator Mike White. This was White's eighth writing and directorial credit for the series.

== Reception ==
=== Viewers ===
In its original American broadcast, "Italian Dream" was seen by an estimated 0.421 million household viewers with a 0.08 in the 18-49 demographics. This means that 0.08 percent of all households with televisions watched the episode. This was a 9% decrease from the previous episode, which was watched by 0.460 million household viewers with a 0.06 in the 18-49 demographics.

=== Critical reviews ===
"Italian Dream" received positive reviews from critics. The review aggregator website Rotten Tomatoes reported a 100% approval rating for the episode, based on 4 reviews.

Manuel Betancourt of The A.V. Club gave the episode a "B" grade and wrote, "How all of these unruly desires will unfurl in the next few episodes — and how they'll likely unravel many of these characters' lives — is no doubt what'll keep us coming back week in and week out as we live out another week at the White Lotus: Sicily."

Tom Smyth of Vulture gave the episode a 4 star rating out of 5 and wrote, "Last week, we were introduced to the Sicilian legend of “Teste di Moro,” about a woman scorned who beheaded her duplicitous lover. But this week, focus seems to be on cutting off a different body part. “I think some women cut off their husband's balls and then they wonder why they’re not attracted to them anymore,” Daphne says, speculating to her husband about the relationship dynamic of their travel companions, Harper and Ethan. This notion of emasculation is a thread that runs throughout 'Italian Dream'. Who's wearing the (designer) pants, and what implications does that have?" Paul Dailly of TV Fanatic gave the episode a 4 star rating out of 5 and wrote, "The White Lotus excels when it puts terrible people in awkward scenarios. 'Italian Dream' was another stand-up example of it."

Henry Wong of Esquire wrote, "Season 2's second episode, 'Italian Dream', does a good job at showing just how quickly the sheen of luxury can fade. Those opulence suites have become a mess overnight, less five-star hotel, more teenage bedroom." Shawn Laib of Den of Geek gave the episode a 4 star rating out of 5 and wrote, "You'd think there would be nothing but merriment and laughs between affluent people, but I guess money doesn't always buy happiness, or even middle-of-the-road contentment. As the romantic couples start to really get into the meat and potatoes of their stays in Sicily, unsteady waters start to rock their marital foundations in heavy waves."
