= Bull Elephants =

- The White Lotus episode
- Episode no.: Season 2 Episode 3
- Directed by: Mike White
- Written by: Mike White
- Cinematography by: Xavier Grobet
- Editing by: John M. Valerio
- Original release date: November 13, 2022
- Running time: 58 minutes

Guest appearances
- Federico Ferrante as Rocco; Eleonora Romandini as Isabella; Federico Scribani Rossi as Giuseppe; Paolo Camilli as Hugo; Bruno Gouery as Didier; Francesco Zecca as Matteo

Episode chronology
← Previous "Italian Dream"	Next → "In the Sandbox"
- The White Lotus season 2

"Bull Elephants" is the third episode of the second season of the American black comedy drama anthology television series The White Lotus. It is the ninth overall episode of the series and was written and directed by series creator Mike White. It originally aired on HBO on November 13, 2022.

The series follows the guests and employees of the fictional White Lotus resort chain. The season is set on Taormina, Sicily, and follows the new guests, which include Ethan and his wife Harper; Cameron and his wife Daphne; Bert, his son Dominic, and grandson Albie; and Tanya and her husband Greg. The season explores the characters' conflicts, along with the short-tempered manager Valentina. In the episode, Cameron and Ethan go on their own, while Harper and Daphne stay at Noto. Meanwhile, Tanya tries to find guidance in her marriage's problems.

According to Nielsen Media Research, the episode was seen by an estimated 0.474 million household viewers and gained a 0.06 ratings share among adults aged 18–49. The episode received positive reviews from critics, who praised the performances (particularly Theo James), writing and revelations.

== Plot ==
After their night together, Dominic (Michael Imperioli) has Lucia (Simona Tabasco) and Mia (Beatrice Grannò) leave his room. As they leave, they are seen leaving by Bert (F. Murray Abraham). He tells Dominic he knows about their night, so Dominic asks him not to say anything to Albie (Adam DiMarco).

Wanting to show Ethan (Will Sharpe) she can be fun and spontaneous, Harper (Aubrey Plaza) decides to be more positive with him, Cameron (Theo James) and Daphne (Meghann Fahy). She agrees to spend the day in Noto with Daphne, but is surprised when Daphne reveals that they'll be staying in a palazzo for the night. This news also frustrates Cameron, who goes jetskiing with Ethan. Albie insists a resistant Portia (Haley Lu Richardson) go on a day trip with him and his family, remembering her comments about being more assertive. However, shortly into the trip, Tanya (Jennifer Coolidge) recalls her to the hotel. After Greg (Jon Gries) leaves, Tanya consults a tarot reader, who tells her Greg loves another woman and that her madness will lead to her suicide. This annoys Tanya, causing her to end the session. At the bar, she notices a mysterious man (Tom Hollander) staring at her.

That night, Dominic tells Lucia that he cannot see her again as he wants to overcome his sex addiction. Whilst sitting by the pool, Portia sees a young English man (Leo Woodall) before being approached and unexpectedly kissed by Albie, who walks her back to her room. While dining, Cameron tries to persuade Ethan to cheat on Harper, claiming it is something that everyone does, and also tries to get him to invest with his company. They are approached by Lucia and Mia, who take an interest in them.

At the palazzo, Daphne reveals to Harper that she knows Cameron often cheats on her, but doesn't let it get to her and instead does what she has to do to "feel better". Later, Mia and Lucia party with Cameron and Ethan at their rooms. While Cameron and Lucia have sex, Ethan gently rejects Mia's advances and leaves the room. Harper attempts to call Ethan, who does not answer his phone.

== Production ==
=== Development ===
The episode was written and directed by series creator Mike White. This was White's ninth writing and directorial credit for the series.

== Reception ==
=== Viewers ===
In its original American broadcast, "Bull Elephants" was seen by an estimated 0.474 million household viewers with a 0.06 in the 18-49 demographics. This means that 0.06 percent of all households with televisions watched the episode. This was a slight increase from the previous episode, which was watched by 0.421 million household viewers with a 0.08 in the 18-49 demographics.

=== Critical reviews ===
"Bull Elephants" received positive reviews from critics. The review aggregator website Rotten Tomatoes reported a 100% approval rating for the episode, based on 2 reviews.

Manuel Betancourt of The A.V. Club gave the episode a "B" grade and wrote, "There is an elegance to the construction of every episode of The White Lotus: Sicily. As with his first season, writer-director Mike White has made it so that each new hour of his series takes us through one full day in the lives of the guests at the namesake hotel. This allows every new entry to have a contained quality to it; there's no stretching or compressing of time, just its gentle march forward. This also means we always begin anew. It's morning after all, a time for new beginnings but also a time to reassess what's come to pass."

Tom Smyth of Vulture gave the episode a 4 star rating out of 5 and wrote, "We see a shift for several of our characters this episode, in which they're confronted with who they are and are challenged to change, either by themselves or by others. But are these efforts sustainable? Can they really change?" Paul Dailly of TV Fanatic gave the episode a 3.75 star rating out of 5 and wrote, "'Bull Elephants' wasn't as much about the mystery as you would expect at this point of the season, but it was a nice deep dive into the psyche of these characters, most of whom are just terrible."

Henry Wong of Esquire wrote, "The resulting nights out, the girls on edibles, the boys on MDMA, provide The White Lotus' second season with its first stand-out moment, and a reminder – as if you needed one – to never go on a couples holiday." Shawn Laib of Den of Geek gave the episode a 4 star rating out of 5 and wrote, "The White Lotus boldly throws these same questions into viewers' faces throughout the third episode of the second season, 'Bull Elephants'. The hour essentially takes two of the most fascinating characters in the new season, Dominic and Ethan, and puts them on a juxtaposed path of transformation. Both men have had their key tendencies etched out in hints during the previous two weeks."
