= In the Sandbox =

- The White Lotus episode
- Episode no.: Season 2 Episode 4
- Directed by: Mike White
- Written by: Mike White
- Cinematography by: Xavier Grobet
- Editing by: Heather Persons
- Original release date: November 20, 2022
- Running time: 58 minutes

Guest appearances
- Federico Ferrante as Rocco; Eleonora Romandini as Isabella; Federico Scribani Rossi as Giuseppe; Paolo Camilli as Hugo; Bruno Gouery as Didier; Francesco Zecca as Matteo

Episode chronology
← Previous "Bull Elephants"	Next → "That's Amore"
- The White Lotus season 2

"In the Sandbox" is the fourth episode of the second season of the American black comedy drama anthology television series The White Lotus. It is the tenth overall episode of the series and was written and directed by series creator Mike White. It originally aired on HBO on November 20, 2022.

The series follows the guests and employees of the fictional White Lotus resort chain. The season is set on Taormina, Sicily, and follows the new guests, which include Ethan and his wife Harper; Cameron and his wife Daphne; Bert, his son Dominic, and grandson Albie; and Tanya and her husband Greg. The season explores the characters' conflicts, along with the short-tempered manager Valentina. In the episode, Harper suspects Ethan is hiding details behind his night with Cameron, while Mia decides to further her musical career.

According to Nielsen Media Research, the episode was seen by an estimated 0.474 million household viewers and gained a 0.07 ratings share among adults aged 18–49. The episode received mostly positive reviews from critics, who praised the dark humor, performances and themes.

== Plot ==
After a night of sex, Cameron (Theo James) awakens Lucia (Simona Tabasco) and Mia (Beatrice Grannò). He cannot pay them their complete fee, so he promises to give them the rest of the cash in the coming days. Ethan (Will Sharpe) feels hungover after taking MDMA, and decides not to tell Harper (Aubrey Plaza) about the previous evening. When she returns, she finds a condom wrapper in their room.

Tanya (Jennifer Coolidge) is approached by Quentin (Tom Hollander), a wealthy gay Englishman who lives in Palermo. He invites her and Portia (Haley Lu Richardson) to hang out with his friends, Matteo (Francesco Zecca), Hugo (Paolo Camilli) and Didier (Bruno Gouery). Portia is also introduced to Quentin's nephew, Jack (Leo Woodall), whom she previously met by the pool. Albie (Adam DiMarco) is frustrated by this. Albie meets Lucia and hits it off with her, unaware she is a sex worker, and they spend the day together.

Motivated to further her musical career, Mia approaches Giuseppe (Federico Scribani Rossi), agreeing to have sex with him if he helps her. They head to a chapel for sex. However, Giuseppe is unable to perform sexually, so Mia leaves to get Viagra from Lucia, but accidentally retrieves MDMA from her bag instead. She gives the pills to Giuseppe, who ultimately collapses and is taken away in an ambulance.

Harper confronts Ethan about his night alone with Cameron. He dodges her questions and they meet Cameron and Daphne (Meghann Fahy) for dinner. In the bar, Albie witnesses Portia and Jack kissing. Lucia, sensing his jealousy, kisses him to help him retaliate against Portia. Portia and Jack leave to have sex, while Lucia performs oral sex on Albie in his room.

== Production ==
=== Development ===
The episode was written and directed by series creator Mike White. This was White's tenth writing and directorial credit for the series.

== Reception ==
=== Viewers ===
In its original American broadcast, "In the Sandbox" was seen by an estimated 0.416 million household viewers with a 0.07 in the 18-49 demographics. This means that 0.07 percent of all households with televisions watched the episode. This was a 13% decrease from the previous episode, which was watched by 0.474 million household viewers with a 0.06 in the 18-49 demographics.

=== Critical reviews ===
"In the Sandbox" received mostly positive reviews from critics. The review aggregator website Rotten Tomatoes reported a 100% approval rating for the episode, based on 2 reviews.

Manuel Betancourt of The A.V. Club gave the episode a "B+" grade and wrote, "It's probably best The White Lotus: Sicily doesn't constantly remind us that we're careening toward a finale wherein guests (plural!) meet their ends. Just as in season one, we're just given that frame on episode one and then we're asked to live day in and day out following the guests and workers at the hotel. So much so that there are times when I forget the pall of death is what's constantly hovering every interaction we witness."

Tom Smyth of Vulture gave the episode a perfect 5 star rating out of 5 and wrote, "It's the midpoint in the season, which by extension means that our guests are halfway through their Sicilian vacations. And for most of them, the trip they find themselves on looks a lot different than the one they’d planned. For some, it even looks different than the trip they were on just yesterday. Good vacations have turned bad, and bad ones have turned good. All the while, our characters are navigating these unexpected changes in circumstance, and loss of control, with mixed success." Paul Dailly of TV Fanatic gave the episode a 4.25 star rating out of 5 and wrote, "Is it just me, or is the resort becoming a pressure cooker environment? Secrets were revealed, and relationships crumbled on 'In the Sandbox', making this tranquil location feel more like hell than a vacation destination."

Henry Wong of Esquire wrote, "Being hungover on holiday is both a blessing and a curse: your resort might be a good place to sweat out the booze, but that alcohol-induced anxiety also really gets in the way of those views, that sparkling pool, and the breakfast buffet. It is, as one of this show's boisterous Americans might say, the not so dolce vita. This week, show creator Mike White pushes that tension to luxurious extremes." Shawn Laib of Den of Geek gave the episode a 3.5 star rating out of 5 and wrote, "As we reach the midway point of Mike White's unique social satire, it's clear to see these characters are hornier than multi-pimpled teenagers sitting in math class. Everyone needs a piece of somebody else, and while it makes for some humorous scenarios and awkward conversations, the lack of ingenuity in the storytelling this season is starting to pale in comparison to the show's brilliant first act in the summer of 2021."
