= Ciao (The White Lotus) =

- The White Lotus episode
- Ethan and Harper Spiller join Cameron and Daphne Sullivan on a trip to Sicily
- Episode no.: Season 2 Episode 1
- Directed by: Mike White
- Written by: Mike White
- Cinematography by: Xavier Grobet
- Editing by: John M. Valerio
- Original release date: October 30, 2022
- Running time: 57 minutes

Guest appearances
- Federico Ferrante as Rocco; Eleonora Romandini as Isabella; Federico Scribani Rossi as Giuseppe

Episode chronology
| ← Previous "Departures" | Next → "Italian Dream" |
- The White Lotus season 2

"Ciao" is the first episode of the second season of the American black comedy drama anthology television series The White Lotus. The episode was written and directed by series creator Mike White. It originally aired on HBO on October 30, 2022.

The series follows the guests and employees of the fictional White Lotus resort chain. The season is set on Taormina, Sicily, and follows the new guests, which include Ethan and his wife Harper; Cameron and his wife Daphne; Bert, his son Dominic, and grandson Albie; and Tanya and her husband Greg. The season explores the characters' conflicts, along with the short-tempered manager Valentina.

According to Nielsen Media Research, the episode was seen by an estimated 0.460 million household viewers and gained a 0.06 ratings share among adults aged 18–49. The episode received very positive reviews from critics, who praised the new characters, setting, cinematography and humor.

== Plot ==
At a beach near Taormina, Sicily, a woman named Daphne (Meghann Fahy) talks with some tourists, remarking that she had a great vacation stay at a White Lotus resort. She then swims in the sea, where she is shocked to stumble upon a body. She quickly returns to the beach for help. The White Lotus' manager, Valentina (Sabrina Impacciatore) is informed by her concierge, Rocco (Federico Ferrante), that more bodies were retrieved from the beach, all of which were guests at their resort.

One week earlier, Valentina welcomes the newest guests at the resort. These include married couple Ethan (Will Sharpe) and Harper Spiller (Aubrey Plaza), who are accompanying Ethan's brash college roommate Cameron Sullivan (Theo James) and his wife Daphne; the Di Grasso family, which consists of Bert (F. Murray Abraham), his son Dominic (Michael Imperioli), and his grandson Albie (Adam DiMarco); and Tanya (Jennifer Coolidge), who is now married to Greg (Jon Gries), but their relationship is strained. Tanya has also brought her young assistant Portia (Haley Lu Richardson), which annoys Greg as he wanted a romantic getaway, so she orders Portia to stay in her room. At the dock, sex worker Lucia (Simona Tabasco) and her friend Mia (Beatrice Grannò) await the arrival of Lucia's newest client, one of the guests.

Harper is annoyed by Cameron and Daphne, despite Ethan's insistence that they are very kind. During lunch, Harper's disdain grows, especially when she learns that Cameron and Daphne are ignorant of global affairs. Later on, Harper goes to her bathroom, where Cameron (as the couples live in an adjacent room) exposes himself when changing clothes. Portia is upset about Tanya's treatment of her, and ends up meeting Albie by the pool. Dominic is trying to fix his marriage after multiple infidelities, and also has to keep Bert in check as he sexually harasses many of the employees at the hotel.

That night, Lucia sneaks into the resort, avoiding Valentina who wants to kick her out. She meets with her client, Dominic. Mia, meanwhile, stays at the bar, where she meets the resort's pianist, Giuseppe (Federico Scribani Rossi). However, Giuseppe takes her for a sex worker, and she throws her drink in his face. As Cameron and Daphne spend time together in their room, Harper tells Ethan about Cameron exposing himself, which Ethan downplays. In Dominic's room, he and Lucia have sex.

== Production ==
=== Development ===
The episode was written and directed by series creator Mike White. This was White's seventh writing and directorial credit for the series.

== Reception ==
=== Viewers ===
In its original American broadcast, "Ciao" was seen by an estimated 460,000 household viewers with a 0.06 in the 18-49 demographics. This means that 0.06 percent of all households with televisions watched the episode. This was a 46% decrease from the previous episode, which was watched by 850,000 household viewers with a 0.2 in the 18-49 demographics.

=== Critical reviews ===
"Ciao" received very positive reviews from critics. The review aggregator website Rotten Tomatoes reported an 86% approval rating for the episode, based on 7 reviews.

Manuel Betancourt of The A.V. Club gave the episode a "B+" grade and wrote, "How their stories (oh, and the Italian escort, who's already gotten on the bad side of the hotel's manager) will all intertwine as the episodes unfold is yet to be revealed. But I will say this about this latest White sojourn: His eye and ear for how privileged folks move through the world continue to be unmatched, especially within the trappings of a very funny black comedy that looks and sounds as sumptuous as its titular hotel."

Tom Smyth of Vulture gave the episode a perfect 5 star rating out of 5 and wrote, "It's finally time to check back into The White Lotus. After the success of last year's Hawaii-set season, what was originally supposed to be a limited series is now an anthology, with this second season following a (mostly) new set of characters at the White Lotus's Sicily location. While the new locale means a new Italian twist on the opening credits, one element of the show that stays the same in its opening moments? Somebody's dead." Paul Dailly of TV Fanatic gave the episode a 4 star rating out of 5 and wrote, "If there were any concerns that The White Lotus Season 2 wouldn't be able to find a compelling enough bunch of characters to kickstart a new mystery, 'Ciao' washed them away."

Erik Kain of Forbes wrote, "It all feels devilishly delightful so far, a splendid, glitzy, menacing return to what made the first season so great. Terrific writing, complicated, well-drawn characters who we still know so little about, and enough mystery to keep us guessing." Shawn Laib of Den of Geek gave the episode a 4.5 star rating out of 5 and wrote, "What makes The White Lotus special is when all of these people start interacting and affecting each other's trips. The first season only did this sparingly, which made it simultaneously fulfilling when it happened and disappointing when it wasn't exploited more. This is something I'll keep an eye on as the second episode comes around next week."

=== Accolades ===
TVLine named Meghann Fahy as an honorable mention as the "Performer of the Week" for the week of November 5, 2022, for her performance in the episode. The site wrote, "The White Lotus specializes in churning out fresh variations of painfully oblivious rich people, and Season 2 has a great one in chipper wife Daphne, played to smiley perfection by Meghann Fahy. Daphne is happily married and very wealthy and just can't understand why everyone isn't enjoying life as much as she is. Her awkward breakfast with the cynical Harper was a masterclass in how blinding privilege can be, with Daphne merrily laughing off Harper's worries about the grim state of the world. Daphne did earnestly try to understand Harper, though, with Fahy employing a few sympathetic grimaces before falling back on Daphne's sunny grin. We also loved how her eyes lit up talking about morbid true crime TV — and Ted Lasso! It'd be easy to hate Daphne, but Fahy's subtly layered performance has already made her one of our favorite guests."
