= The White Lotus season 2 =

Season of television series

The White Lotus
- Season 2
- Promotional poster
- Showrunner: Mike White
- Starring: F. Murray Abraham; Jennifer Coolidge; Adam DiMarco; Meghann Fahy; Beatrice Grannò; Jon Gries; Tom Hollander; Sabrina Impacciatore; Michael Imperioli; Theo James; Aubrey Plaza; Haley Lu Richardson; Will Sharpe; Simona Tabasco; Leo Woodall
- No. of episodes: 7

Release
- Original network: HBO
- Original release: October 30 – December 11, 2022

Season chronology
- ← Previous; Season 1 Next → Season 3

The second season of The White Lotus, an American satirical comedy drama anthology television series created, written, and directed by Mike White, premiered on HBO on October 30, 2022. The season was greenlit in August 2021, filmed in Sicily in early 2022, and features an ensemble cast of F. Murray Abraham, Jennifer Coolidge, Adam DiMarco, Meghann Fahy, Beatrice Grannò, Jon Gries, Tom Hollander, Sabrina Impacciatore, Michael Imperioli, Theo James, Aubrey Plaza, Haley Lu Richardson, Will Sharpe, Simona Tabasco, and Leo Woodall. Coolidge and Gries reprise their roles from the previous season.

The plot follows the lives of the staff and wealthy guests at a luxury resort in Sicily. The season received critical acclaim, earning 12 nominations at the 75th Primetime Emmys and 11 nominations at the Creative Arts Emmys, winning five awards across both ceremonies.

== Cast and characters ==
=== Main ===
- F. Murray Abraham as Bert Di Grasso, Dominic's elderly, womanizing father
- Jennifer Coolidge as Tanya McQuoid-Hunt, reprising her role from the first season
- Adam DiMarco as Albie Di Grasso, Dominic's son and a recent Stanford graduate
- Meghann Fahy as Daphne Sullivan, Cameron's stay-at-home wife
- Beatrice Grannò as Mia, a local aspiring singer who initially resists her friend Lucia's attempts to introduce her to sex work
- Jon Gries as Greg Hunt, Tanya's husband
- Tom Hollander as Quentin, a wealthy, gay British expat living in Sicily
- Sabrina Impacciatore as Valentina, the manager of the White Lotus in Sicily
- Michael Imperioli as Dominic Di Grasso, a sex-addicted Hollywood producer traveling with his father, Bert, and son, Albie
- Theo James as Cameron Sullivan, a cocky and scheming investments manager, Daphne's husband and Ethan's college friend
- Aubrey Plaza as Harper Spiller, a straight-laced employment lawyer and Ethan's wife
- Haley Lu Richardson as Portia, Tanya's young assistant whom she brings on her vacation
- Will Sharpe as Ethan Spiller, a newly wealthy tech entrepreneur, Harper's husband and Cameron's college friend
- Simona Tabasco as Lucia Greco, a local hustler and sex worker
- Leo Woodall as Jack, a young man from Essex, whom Quentin introduces as his "naughty nephew"

=== Recurring ===
- Federico Ferrante as Rocco, a concierge at the White Lotus to whom Valentina has taken an inordinate dislike
- Eleonora Romandini as Isabella, a concierge at the White Lotus
- Federico Scribani Rossi as Giuseppe, a lecherous middle-aged lounge singer and pianist at the White Lotus
- Francesco Zecca as Matteo, Quentin's friend
- Paolo Camilli as Hugo, Quentin's friend
- Bruno Gouery as Didier, Quentin's friend
- Nicola Di Pinto as Tommaso, the captain of Quentin's yacht

=== Guest ===
- Laura Dern as the voice of Abby, Dominic's estranged wife
- Angelina Keeley and Kara Kay as two hotel guests.

== Episodes ==
No. overall	No. in season	Title	Directed by	Written by	Original release date	U.S. viewers (millions)
7	1	"Ciao"	Mike White	Mike White	October 30, 2022	0.460
A body is found floating off the beach club of the White Lotus in Taormina, Sicily. A week earlier, a group of guests arrives at the White Lotus, greeted by its short-tempered manager, Valentina. Among them is Tanya, now in a strained marriage with Greg. Greg is angered to learn that Tanya brought her assistant Portia along on a romantic getaway; to appease him, while still retaining Portia's services, Tanya orders Portia to stay in her room, out of sight. An upset Portia later meets and bonds with Albie Di Grasso, a recent Stanford graduate who is exploring his ancestral roots in Sicily alongside his father, Dominic—a Hollywood producer whose marriage is failing due to his numerous infidelities—and lecherous grandfather, Bert. Meanwhile, married couple Ethan and Harper Spiller are vacationing with Ethan's brash college roommate Cameron Sullivan and his wife, Daphne, at the Sullivans' invitation. Harper is put off by Cameron and Daphne, believing their constant displays of affection to be insincere. While Cameron changes into swimming trunks, he exposes himself to Harper. Ethan dismisses Harper's concerns and says Cameron probably did not realize she could see him. Lucia, a local sex worker, sneaks into the resort with her friend Mia to meet her latest client, Dominic.
8	2	"Italian Dream"	Mike White	Mike White	November 6, 2022	0.421
Dominic registers Lucia and Mia with the hotel as his guests, to the annoyance of Valentina, the manager. Portia joins the Di Grasso family on a visit to the ancient theatre of Taormina, where Bert continues to make inappropriate conversation. Albie and Portia discuss their romantic preferences over dinner, and Portia later violates her non-disclosure agreement with Tanya by divulging sordid details of Tanya's past to Albie. Albie awkwardly kisses Portia at the end of their night. Bert, meanwhile, chastises Dominic for being "sloppy" in how he conducts his extramarital affairs. Dominic later explains to Lucia that he wants to overcome his sex addiction, but relents when she and Mia offer to "thank" him for letting them enjoy the hotel's amenities on his tab. Ethan and Harper struggle to build sexual chemistry while on the trip, in contrast to Cameron and Daphne. Harper later apologizes to Ethan for being a "shrew" and promises to enjoy their trip. Greg tells Tanya he has to fly back to Denver for work. She later overhears him on the phone with his possible lover.
9	3	"Bull Elephants"	Mike White	Mike White	November 13, 2022	0.474
Bert tells Dominic he spotted Lucia and Mia leaving his room; Dominic, feeling guilty and ashamed, severs ties with Lucia. Albie tries to impress Portia on a day trip with his family, but Tanya calls her away; she is very upset about Greg's departure and needs Portia's support. Tanya consults a tarot reader, who tells her that Greg is in love with someone else. That evening, Albie attempts to be more sexually forward with Portia, but she finds herself more attracted to an English man she spots at the hotel pool. Daphne and Harper visit Noto while Cameron and Ethan spend the day jetskiing. Daphne has secretly rented a palazzo in Noto for the night, where she tells Harper that although she is aware of Cameron's infidelities, she chooses not to see herself as a victim, and implies that she also has her own affairs. Disappointed that Ethan did not give him any insider trading tips, Cameron attempts to persuade him to invest with his company. They spend the night drinking, taking MDMA and partying with Lucia and Mia; Cameron has sex with Lucia, but Ethan turns down Mia.
10	4	"In the Sandbox"	Mike White	Mike White	November 20, 2022	0.416
Cameron does not pay Lucia and Mia in full. Harper and Daphne return from Noto. When Harper presses Ethan about the previous night, he admits only to getting drunk, concealing Cameron's infidelity. Harper is shocked to discover a condom wrapper in their room but spends the day pondering it rather than confronting Ethan. Tanya is befriended by Quentin, a wealthy English gay man who lives in Palermo. He introduces her to his friends and she has a great time. Portia meets his nephew Jack, whom she had earlier seen at the pool, and they hit it off. Albie, meanwhile, meets Lucia while waiting for Portia. Unaware that she is a sex worker who slept with his father, he gets on well with her. As Lucia begins to question her life choices, Mia suddenly decides to have sex with Giuseppe in order to further her musical career, ignoring Lucia's attempts to dissuade her. This backfires when Giuseppe, unable to perform sexually, takes a pill Mia says is Viagra, then collapses during his evening gig and is taken away in an ambulance. Shortly after Jack and Portia leave the bar to sleep together, Albie and Lucia go back to his room, where she performs oral sex on him.
11	5	"That's Amore"	Mike White	Mike White	November 27, 2022	0.641
Ethan finally comes clean with Harper after discovering the condom wrapper; she grudgingly accepts his apology. The two couples go on a wine-tasting trip on which an increasingly drunk Harper drops various hints that she knows what happened. Ethan accuses Cameron of "mimetic desire" for seducing every woman Ethan was interested in at college. Throughout the day Harper continually undermines and embarrasses Ethan. At dinner, Cameron puts his hand on Harper's leg under the table. Albie is surprised when Lucia asks for payment for the previous night's sex. Dominic attempts to dissuade Albie and Lucia from seeing each other, but Albie seems to have fallen for her. Lucia is accosted by a man named Alessio, whom she says is her pimp. Albie and Lucia again spend the night together. Discerning that Valentina is gay, Mia offers her sexual favors in exchange for Giuseppe's piano gig until he recovers. Tanya and Portia visit Palermo with Quentin and his friends. Tanya accompanies Quentin to a performance of Madama Butterfly at the Teatro Massimo. Meanwhile Jack and Portia explore the town, doing a dine and dash after sampling the arancini at a local restaurant. Tanya is later shocked to discover Jack having sex with Quentin.
12	6	"Abductions"	Mike White	Mike White	December 4, 2022	0.684
Ethan and Harper discuss their mutual lack of attraction, with Harper asking Ethan if he still desires her. After seeing Harper interacting with Cameron on the beach, Ethan becomes increasingly suspicious that Harper is cheating on him with Cameron. The Di Grassos go to visit the home of their apparent relatives. Albie brings Lucia along as a translator, but Alessio follows them; Lucia eventually agrees to go with him, over the Di Grassos' protests. The Di Grassos arrive at their ancestral village and locate a Di Grasso family there, whom they visit unannounced, without a translator. The family members are three women of different generations, who angrily turn them away. Bert is despondent, having hoped for a happier "homecoming". Lucia returns to the hotel and tells Albie that she can only placate Alessio once she pays him the money she owes. Valentina enjoys her first lesbian tryst with Mia, after Isabella, a concierge with whom Valentina has been infatuated, reveals her engagement to fellow concierge Rocco, whom Valentina had reassigned to the beach club to get closer to Isabella. Tanya hints to Portia that Jack may not be Quentin's nephew. Quentin sets up Tanya with his cocaine dealer, Niccolò; before they have sex, Tanya finds a framed photo of a young Quentin with a man who resembles a young Greg. Drunk, Jack tells Portia that Quentin and his friends have spent all their money on their luxuries, and cryptically implies that Quentin rescued him from dire circumstances in exchange for sex.
13	7	"Arrivederci"	Mike White	Mike White	December 11, 2022	0.854
Harper admits to Ethan that Cameron kissed her. He furiously attacks Cameron, nearly drowning him before a bystander intervenes. Ethan shares his suspicions with Daphne, who repeats the advice she gave Harper, to do whatever makes him feel better; she then invites him to join her on a walk to a nearby island, possibly to have sex. An invigorated Ethan later has sex with Harper, reigniting the passion in their marriage. Albie convinces Dominic to wire €50,000 to Lucia to save her from Alessio, in exchange for Albie's help in salvaging Dominic's marriage. Lucia quietly leaves Albie the next morning. Valentina restores Rocco to reception, at Isabella's request, and hires Mia as the resort's new piano player, angering Giuseppe. Portia wakes up to find her phone missing. She calls Tanya on Jack's phone to alert her that something is wrong. Tanya suspects that Greg hired Quentin and his associates to kill her so that he can inherit her fortune. Panicking and paranoid after finding duct tape and rope in Niccolò's bag, she retrieves his gun and kills him, Quentin, and Didier. While attempting to board a dinghy to escape, she slips, hits her head, and drowns. Her body washes up to shore the next day and is discovered by Daphne, and the other bodies on the yacht are found soon after. Portia confronts Jack about his role as a sex worker with Quentin; he says he will take her back to Taormina but leaves her near Catania–Fontanarossa Airport, telling her not to return to the hotel. Albie and Portia reunite at the airport. Lucia and Mia celebrate their successful scam with Alessio, who is actually a hotel worker.

== Production ==
=== Development ===
On August 10, 2021, HBO renewed The White Lotus for a second season. White initially envisioned the second season taking place in a political setting, such as a Bilderberg conference, but scrapped that idea and chose Italy instead. He said, "The kind of mythology of Sicily, at least from the point of view of Americans, is the archetypal sexual politics and role play that you associate with, like, opera and the mafia and Italian romance. I felt like it should be more focused on men and women and relationships and adultery and have an operatic feel to it, so I pivoted." Asked to describe the second season, White likened it to "a bedroom farce with teeth". Kim Neundorf served as an additional composer for the season. White was inspired for the season by a trip he took with Jennifer Coolidge to Africa.

=== Casting ===
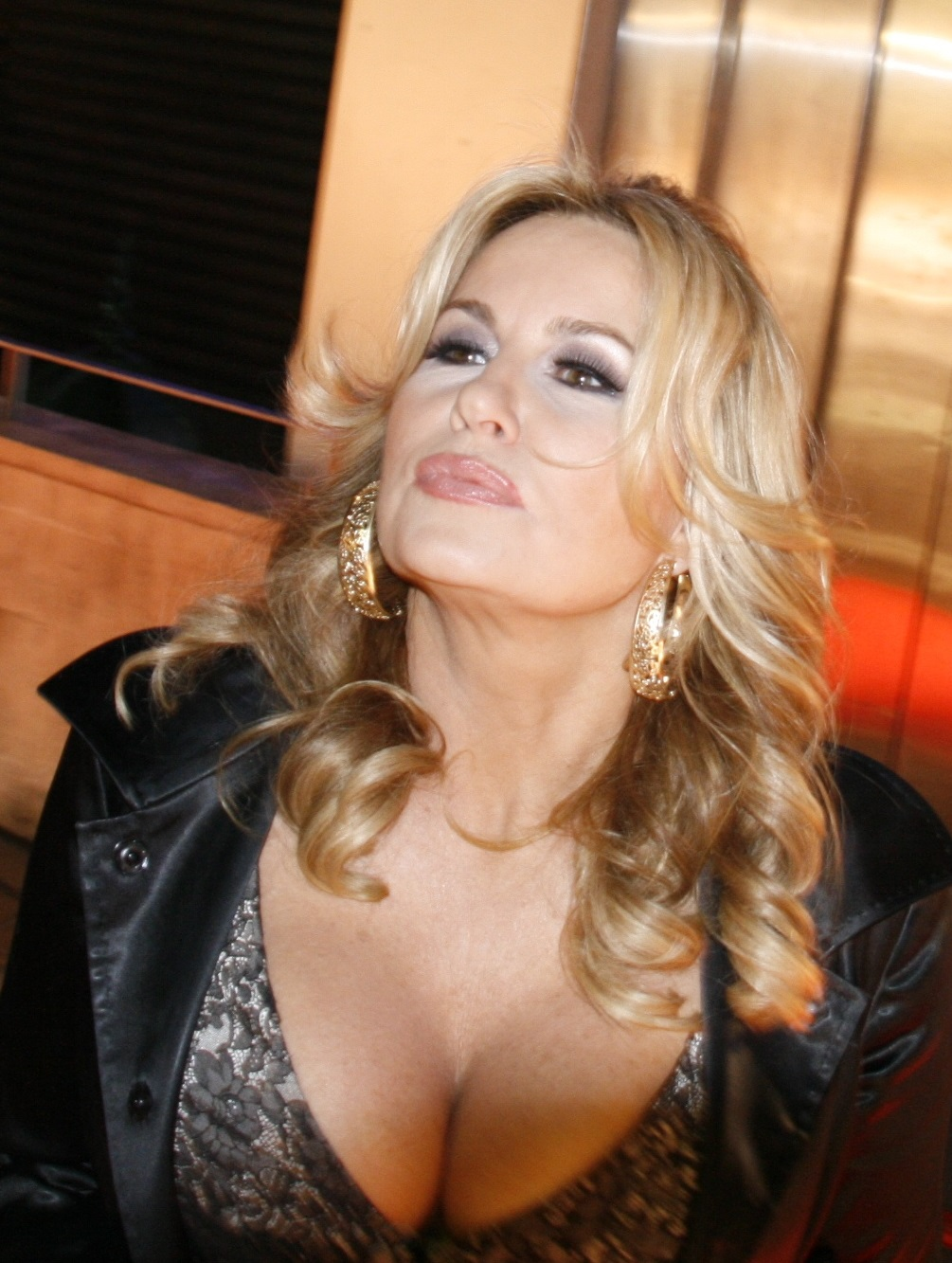
Jennifer Coolidge reprises her role from the first season.

HBO announced that a predominantly new cast of characters would be at another White Lotus property for the second season, though White had said it was possible that a few characters from season 1 would return. On October 15, 2021, Coolidge was reported to be set to return for the second season. She and Jon Gries are the only actors in the season to reprise their roles from the previous season. In January 2022, Michael Imperioli, Aubrey Plaza, F. Murray Abraham, Adam DiMarco, Tom Hollander, and Haley Lu Richardson were confirmed to star in the season. In February 2022, Theo James, Meghann Fahy, and Will Sharpe joined the cast as series regulars, with Leo Woodall in a recurring role. In March 2022, Beatrice Grannò, Sabrina Impacciatore, and Simona Tabasco joined the cast. The season features White's fellow Survivor: David vs. Goliath contestants Kara Kay and Angelina Keeley in cameo roles.

=== Filming ===
On January 20, 2022, the second season was reported to be filmed at the Four Seasons San Domenico Hotel in Taormina, Sicily, Italy; on February 28, HBO confirmed that production had begun there. The opening theme of the second season, accompanied by a chorus of voices, shows scenes inspired by the frescoes of Villa Tasca in Palermo. Filming took place in various locations in Sicily: throughout Taormina, notably the San Domenico Palace hotel, which represents the main location, and in the ancient theatre of Taormina; in Cefalù, with the long beach and the view of the Norman Cathedral; in Fiumefreddo di Sicilia (with the famous Slave Castle); in Palermo, in particular at the Teatro Massimo and Villa Tasca; the interior scenes of the Opera house in Catania at the Teatro Massimo Bellini; in the city of Noto, in particular Villa Elena; Giardini Naxos; and different views of the seafront of Sicily and Mount Etna.

=== Music ===
For the season, Cristobal Tapia de Veer collaborated with his manager Kim Neundorf to finish original compositions due to his own scheduling conflicts. For the theme tune, Tapia de Veer wanted to keep elements of the first season theme but rework it to better fit the Italian setting, including making it more harmonious. The season's theme, "Renaissance", begins with oscillating notes on a harp, and orchestral strings, piano chords, and cymbals are layered in before the return of ululating vocals. This reaches a high pitch before a synthetic EDM dance beat builds and drops. Tapia de Veer credits Neundorf for bringing a more organic sound to the production. Singer Stephanie Osorio provided the vocals, holding a long note as she wavered the sound through her hand. Tapia de Veer sampled this and played different versions of it on a keyboard.

=== Budget ===
According to Vulture, the costs of production for the season remained at under US$3 million per episode, the same as the first season. Italy, where the season was filmed, offers up to 40% tax credit to foreign productions taking place in the country.

== Release ==
The second season premiered on October 30, 2022, on HBO and HBO Max, with episodes released every week until December 11.

== Reception ==
=== Critical response ===
For the second season, Rotten Tomatoes reported a 94% approval rating with an average score of 8.2/10, based on 122 reviews. The website's critical consensus reads, "Swapping its tropical trappings for Euro chic while focusing primarily on the corrosive influence of carnal desire, The White Lotus remains a cookie full of arsenic that goes down smooth." On Metacritic, the season has a score of 81 out of 100 based on 40 critics, indicating "universal acclaim".

Many critics said that White repeated the first season's success with sharp writing, his ensemble cast, and more focused plotlines, with some calling it an improvement on the first season. Lucy Mangan of The Guardian rated it 5 out of 5 and wrote, "The writing is as dense and layered as ever, the plotting is immaculate and the viewers' sympathies—or loathings—are never allowed to rest in one place for too long." For The New Yorker, Inkoo Kang wrote, "the airless sociological fatalism of Season 1, which was matched by a claustrophobic production due to COVID-19 restrictions, gives way to a more mature drama, as well as a deeper exploration of how the characters' class concerns converge with gendered angst." Brian Tallerico of RogerEbert.com wrote, "Mike White is a writer that is as thrilled with a fascinating dinner conversation as he is a murder mystery, and so even as the plotting sags more than it did the first time, the way that his characters bounce off each other, unpacking their social constructs, remains fascinating."

Alison Herman of The Ringer praised the series' pivot to the theme of gender politics, writing, "White knows that sex, like money, is a form of power, and that each is intimately bound up in the other." Melanie McFarland of Salon wrote, "You may not want to be in the same room with the people you're watching, but the sights alone provided a level of escapism like nothing else on TV." For The Washington Post, Travis M. Andrews wrote, "though these new episodes meander at times, Season 2 is more tightly plotted and there are enough new ideas, with even the most staid insights heightened by White's razor-sharp writing, for it to feel fresh." Some critics welcomed the characters Mia and Lucia, two Sicilian sex workers whose plotlines intersect with many of the hotel guests', saying their presence felt like a response by White to criticisms of the previous season's focus on its well-off leads. Others noted how the second season "has invested in horror imagery in a way the previous outing didn't, and it's been one of this installment's best through lines."

Some critics thought the shift from the themes of class criticism to gender roles made for a less riveting watch. For Vulture, Roxana Hadadi wrote that season two "centers infidelity, to diminished effect", and that "there's also a new bluntness, and a noticeable tentativeness, that keeps this second season from hitting as hard and bruising as immediately as its predecessor." Vanity Fair's Richard Lawson called season two a "vibrant set of plates to set spinning, which White does with his usual mix of acerbic bite and melancholy. Though, things do feel a little less pointed this season." Shirley Li of The Atlantic wrote, "Season 2 is as juicy as season 1, but it's not as caustic in its approach." Of the diminished role of the hotel staff, Linda Holmes of NPR wrote, "Thematically, without that tension between how the guests see themselves and how the staff sees them, The White Lotus seems adrift. With all the criticism of the first season and the fair questions about whether it was satirizing its rich and white characters' lack of interest in the people around them or just reproducing it, it was always clear what the show was trying to be about, or thought it was about. It was trying to be about the foibles of wealth and carelessness; it's much less clear where White is going with this story." Coneer Reed, writing for the left-wing magazine Jacobin, praised the series’ exploration of class issues, adding "In a cultural moment where limp 'eat the rich' sentiment is lacquered over any property that would like to appear progressive in the long wake of Parasite’s Best Picture Oscar win, The White Lotus is the rare production that actually merits applause."

The second season appeared in the top ten on numerous publications' "Best of 2022" lists, including first for Good Morning America, The Independent, and San Antonio Express-News; second for I; and third for Cleveland Plain-Dealer, Irish Independent, LA Weekly, Newsday, Radio Times, TV Insider, USA Today, and The Washington Post, among others.

=== Accolades ===
The second season received 12 nominations at the 75th Primetime Emmy Awards in five categories and 11 nominations at the Primetime Creative Arts Emmy Awards in 10 categories, moving from limited/ anthology series to drama. It won four awards at the Creative Arts Emmys. For the Primetime Emmys, Coolidge won Outstanding Supporting Actress. Other nominations included Outstanding Drama Series; F. Murray Abraham, Michael Imperioli, Theo James and Will Sharpe for Outstanding Supporting Actor; Meghann Fahy, Sabrina Impacciatore, Aubrey Plaza, and Simona Tabasco for Outstanding Supporting Actress; and White for Outstanding Directing and Outstanding Writing for the episode "Arrivederci".
