= The White Lotus =

2021 American television series

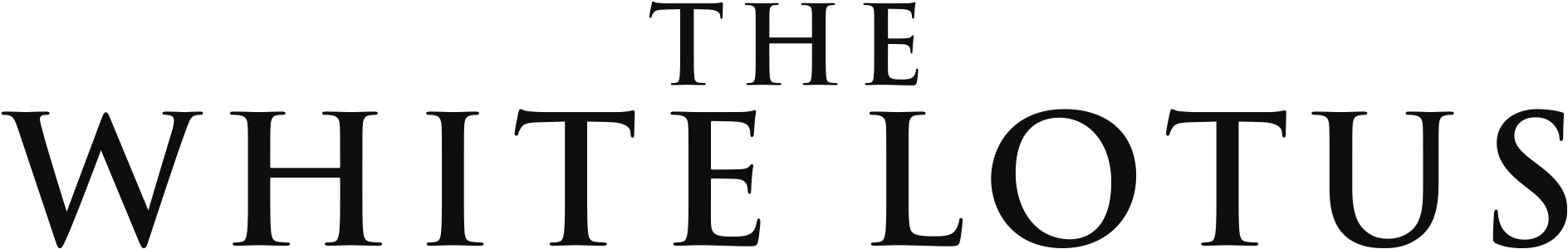
- Genre: Black comedy; Comedy drama; Satire; Tragicomedy
- Created by: Mike White
- Written by: Mike White
- Directed by: Mike White
- Starring: Jennifer Coolidge; Natasha Rothwell; Jon Gries; Additional below
- Music by: Cristobal Tapia de Veer; Kim Neundorf
- Country of origin: United States
- Original languages: English; Italian (s. 2); Thai (s. 3)
- No. of seasons: 3
- No. of episodes: 21

Production
- Executive producers: Nick Hall; David Bernad; Mike White; Mark Kamine
- Producers: John M. Valerio; Heather Persons; Todd Brown
- Production locations: Hawaii; Sicily; Thailand; Southern France
- Cinematography: Ben Kutchins; Xavier Grobet
- Editors: Heather Persons; John M. Valerio; Scott Turner
- Running time: 54–90 minutes
- Production companies: HBO Entertainment; Hallogram; The District; Rip Cord Productions

Original release
- Network: HBO
- Release: July 11, 2021 – present

The White Lotus is an American black and tragi-comedy drama anthology television series created, written, and directed by Mike White that premiered on HBO on July 11, 2021. The series follows the exploits of the guests and staff during a week spent at the White Lotus, a fictional luxury global resort hotel chain. Each season features a mostly different ensemble cast. The first season was filmed and set in Hawaii, the second in Sicily, and the third in Thailand. The upcoming fourth season will be filmed and set in Saint-Tropez, France.

The White Lotus was greenlit in October 2020 as a miniseries but was adapted to an anthology series by HBO in August 2021: its second season aired from October 30 to December 11, 2022, and its third season from February 16 to April 6, 2025, after being delayed by the 2023 Writers Guild of America strike.

The series has been acclaimed by critics for its writing, acting, characters, humor, and production values and has received several accolades: it has won 16 Primetime Emmy Awards—including Outstanding Limited or Anthology Series—and 2 Golden Globes, including Best Limited or Anthology Series or Television Film. Coolidge won several awards for her performance in the first two seasons, including two Primetime Emmys and a Golden Globe. Murray Bartlett also won an Emmy for his performance in the first season, while White won three Emmys for his writing, directing, and producing.

== Premise ==
Each season is set at a different White Lotus resort hotel, and is mostly self-contained, with some characters returning. Each season tells the story of the guests and staff during a week at the hotel. Their interactions are affected by various personal and social issues. As the days pass, a darker complexity emerges in the hotel's employees, their wealthy guests, and the idyllic locale.

== Cast and characters ==
Each season of The White Lotus features a different ensemble cast, with only the following three actors featured in more than one season:

- Jennifer Coolidge as Tanya McQuoid (seasons 1–2)
- Natasha Rothwell as Belinda Lindsey (seasons 1 and 3)
- Jon Gries as Greg Hunt / "Gary" (seasons 2–3, recurring season 1)

=== Season 1 ===
- Murray Bartlett as Armond
- Connie Britton as Nicole Mossbacher
- Alexandra Daddario as Rachel Patton
- Fred Hechinger as Quinn Mossbacher
- Jake Lacy as Shane Patton
- Brittany O'Grady as Paula
- Sydney Sweeney as Olivia Mossbacher
- Steve Zahn as Mark Mossbacher
- Molly Shannon as Kitty Patton

=== Season 2 ===
- F. Murray Abraham as Bert Di Grasso
- Adam DiMarco as Albie Di Grasso
- Meghann Fahy as Daphne Sullivan
- Beatrice Grannò as Mia
- Tom Hollander as Quentin
- Sabrina Impacciatore as Valentina
- Michael Imperioli as Dominic Di Grasso
- Theo James as Cameron Sullivan
- Aubrey Plaza as Harper Spiller
- Haley Lu Richardson as Portia
- Will Sharpe as Ethan Spiller
- Simona Tabasco as Lucia Greco
- Leo Woodall as Jack

=== Season 3 ===
- Leslie Bibb as Kate Bohr
- Carrie Coon as Laurie Duffy
- Walton Goggins as Rick Hatchett
- Sarah Catherine Hook as Piper Ratliff
- Jason Isaacs as Timothy Ratliff
- Lalisa Manobal as Mook
- Michelle Monaghan as Jaclyn Lemon
- Sam Nivola as Lochlan Ratliff
- Lek Patravadi as Sritala Hollinger
- Parker Posey as Victoria Ratliff
- Patrick Schwarzenegger as Saxon Ratliff
- Tayme Thapthimthong as Gaitok
- Aimee Lou Wood as Chelsea
- Sam Rockwell as Frank
- Scott Glenn as Jim Hollinger

=== Season 4 ===
- Chloe Bennet as Brynn
- Sandra Bernhard
- Vincent Cassel
- Steve Coogan
- Charlie Davis
- Laura Dern
- Caleb Jonte Edwards
- Dylan Ennis
- Corentin Fila
- Heather Graham
- Ari Graynor
- Max Greenfield as Mitchell
- Frida Gustavsson
- Charlie Hall as Zach
- Kamilla Karthigesu
- Ben Kingsley
- Marissa Long
- Alexander Ludwig
- Chris Messina
- AJ Michalka
- Max Minghella
- Kumail Nanjiani
- Jarrad Paul
- Rosie Perez
- Tobias Santelmann
- Ben Schnetzer
- Laura Smet
- Pekka Strang
- Nadia Tereszkiewicz

== Episodes ==
| Season | Episodes | Originally released | |
| Season | Episodes | First released | Last released |
|---|---|---|---|
| 1 | 6 | July 11, 2021 | August 15, 2021 |
| 2 | 7 | October 30, 2022 | December 11, 2022 |
| 3 | 8 | February 16, 2025 | April 6, 2025 |

=== Season 1 (2021) ===
| No. overall | No. in season | Title | Directed by | Written by | Original release date | U.S. viewers (millions) |
|---|---|---|---|---|---|---|
| 1 | 1 | "Arrivals" | Mike White | Mike White | July 11, 2021 | 0.420 |
| 2 | 2 | "New Day" | Mike White | Mike White | July 18, 2021 | 0.459 |
| 3 | 3 | "Mysterious Monkeys" | Mike White | Mike White | July 25, 2021 | 0.478 |
| 4 | 4 | "Recentering" | Mike White | Mike White | August 1, 2021 | 0.515 |
| 5 | 5 | "The Lotus-Eaters" | Mike White | Mike White | August 8, 2021 | 0.541 |
| 6 | 6 | "Departures" | Mike White | Mike White | August 15, 2021 | 0.850 |

=== Season 2 (2022) ===
| No. overall | No. in season | Title | Directed by | Written by | Original release date | U.S. viewers (millions) |
|---|---|---|---|---|---|---|
| 7 | 1 | "Ciao" | Mike White | Mike White | October 30, 2022 | 0.460 |
| 8 | 2 | "Italian Dream" | Mike White | Mike White | November 6, 2022 | 0.421 |
| 9 | 3 | "Bull Elephants" | Mike White | Mike White | November 13, 2022 | 0.474 |
| 10 | 4 | "In the Sandbox" | Mike White | Mike White | November 20, 2022 | 0.416 |
| 11 | 5 | "That's Amore" | Mike White | Mike White | November 27, 2022 | 0.641 |
| 12 | 6 | "Abductions" | Mike White | Mike White | December 4, 2022 | 0.684 |
| 13 | 7 | "Arrivederci" | Mike White | Mike White | December 11, 2022 | 0.854 |

=== Season 3 (2025) ===
| No. overall | No. in season | Title | Directed by | Written by | Original release date | U.S. viewers (millions) |
|---|---|---|---|---|---|---|
| 14 | 1 | "Same Spirits, New Forms" | Mike White | Mike White | February 16, 2025 | 0.420 |
| 15 | 2 | "Special Treatments" | Mike White | Mike White | February 23, 2025 | 0.687 |
| 16 | 3 | "The Meaning of Dreams" | Mike White | Mike White | March 2, 2025 | 0.507 |
| 17 | 4 | "Hide or Seek" | Mike White | Mike White | March 9, 2025 | 0.677 |
| 18 | 5 | "Full-Moon Party" | Mike White | Mike White | March 16, 2025 | 0.828 |
| 19 | 6 | "Denials" | Mike White | Mike White | March 23, 2025 | 0.744 |
| 20 | 7 | "Killer Instincts" | Mike White | Mike White | March 30, 2025 | 0.956 |
| 21 | 8 | "Amor Fati" | Mike White | Mike White | April 6, 2025 | 1.370 |

== Production ==
=== Development ===
Development of The White Lotus began after the COVID-19 lockdowns in 2020, when HBO head of programming Casey Bloys asked Mike White whether he had any ideas for a show that could be shot in a bubble environment under lockdown conditions. The show's concept was "partly inspired" by White's work on an earlier proposed series, The Tears of St. Patsy, that was not picked up by a network and would have featured Jennifer Coolidge "as a frustrated actor navigating a dangerous world".

The initial problem White faced was where to set and shoot the show. White did not like commuting to a San Fernando Valley studio to shoot Enlightened and wanted to take his next HBO project to exotic locations. The first idea was Australia, but eight-week-long work visas (the longest available in 2020) were not long enough to shoot a full season. The second idea was Hawaii. At the time, Four Seasons Hotels and Resorts was the only hotel operator in Hawaii willing to allow HBO to take over a property for 13 weeks to shoot a new television series with an unknown plot. No scripts had been finished and all the production team had was a "nondescript first episode", but the show promised to bring the hotel some money, which it preferred to staying closed.

At the beginning, "there was no money to make the show", so the producers staffed it with an ensemble cast where "everyone is treated the same", paid the same, and gets "alphabetical billing". All actors (regardless of prominence) have to audition for the show, and they audition separately; there are no chemistry tests. The cast has to make it work when they finally meet at a Four Seasons resort. All regular cast members work "at scale"—reportedly, roughly $40,000 per episode as of season 3—and that rule is "not negotiable". The producers know some actors cannot accept such conditions and "can't hold it against people who need to make a living", but imposing this system up front and continuing it into subsequent seasons enabled them to focus on casting "people who want to do the project for the right reasons".

The show has changed locations and casts each season, with very little continuity between them apart from the show's basic elements: "a social satire and a murder mystery" set at a White Lotus resort that begins with an unidentified corpse. The consistent theme is a "semi-satirical" tone, but each season has been radically different from the others, requiring "fans to transfer their loyalty to an almost entirely new show". Of the lack of continuity, White said: "This is, like, my dream gig. Because I can burn down the house at the end of every season and begin again". Before production began on each season, White stayed at the resort to do research and write the scripts.

On October 19, 2020, HBO gave The White Lotus a limited series order that consisted of six episodes. The series was created, written and directed by White, who also serves as executive producer alongside David Bernad and Nick Hall.

On August 10, 2021, HBO renewed the series for a second season, which has seven episodes.

On November 18, 2022, HBO renewed the series for a third season. It was announced that the season would take place in Thailand. The third season's production was disrupted by the 2023 Writers Guild of America strike, resulting in its release being delayed to 2025. The story that season originally mentioned that one character had a nonbinary child, but this was cut due to a political "vibe shift" coinciding with the 2024 election of President Donald Trump. White said "there's a lot of stuff that ended up being cut" from every episode. As written and filmed, the episodes were coming in at about an hour and 40 minutes. He needed to be "hard on the material", speed the narrative, and get episode lengths down to about 60 minutes, though they were still "bulging" with plot points.

During filming in Thailand, White pitched a fourth season over dinner in Phuket to Bloys, now the chairman and chief executive officer of HBO, and Francesca Orsi, executive vice president for drama programming. On January 22, 2025, ahead of the third-season premiere, HBO renewed the series for a fourth season, on which production began the next month.

=== Casting ===
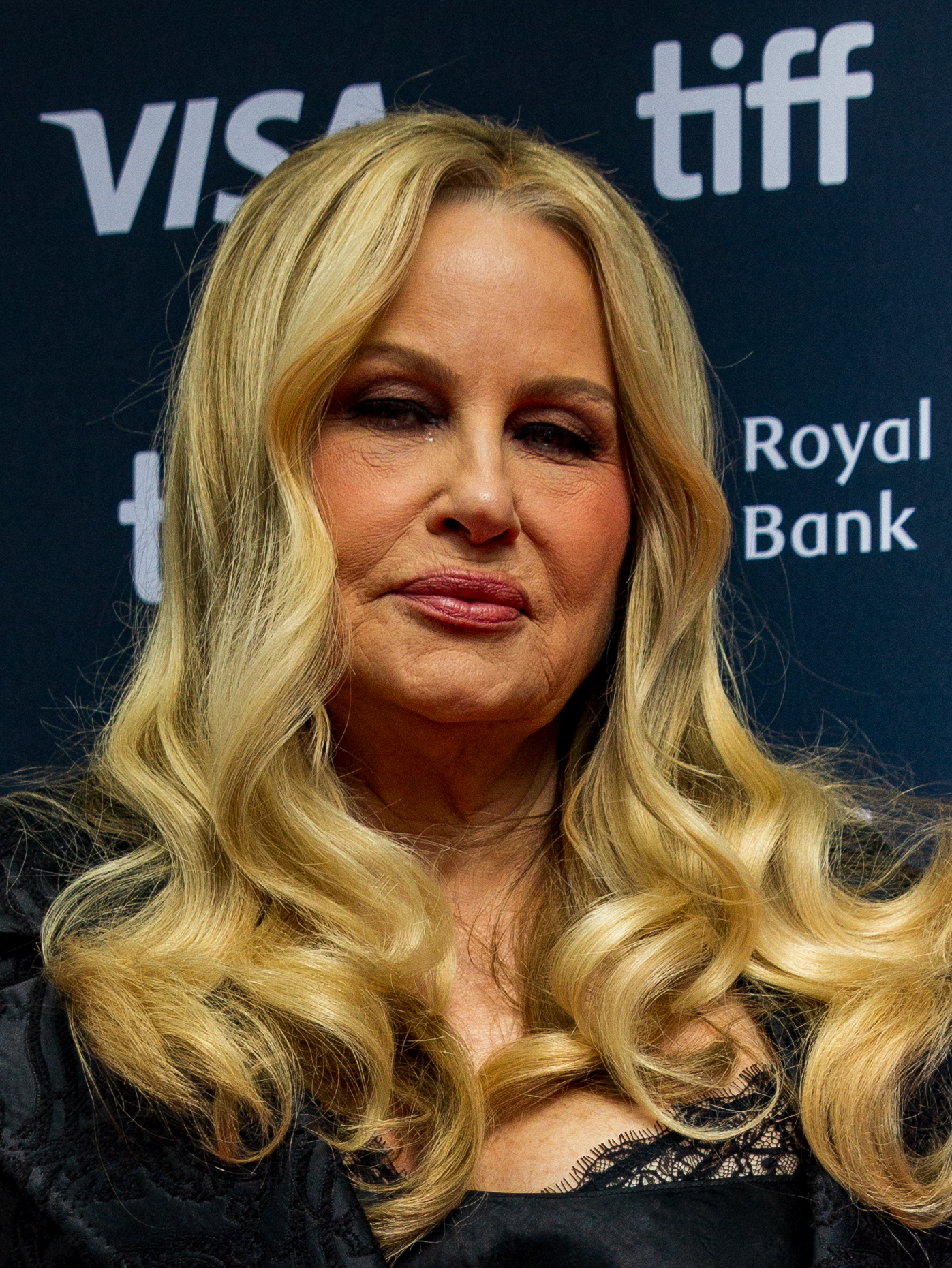
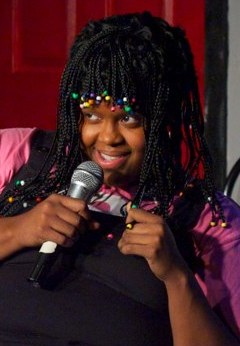
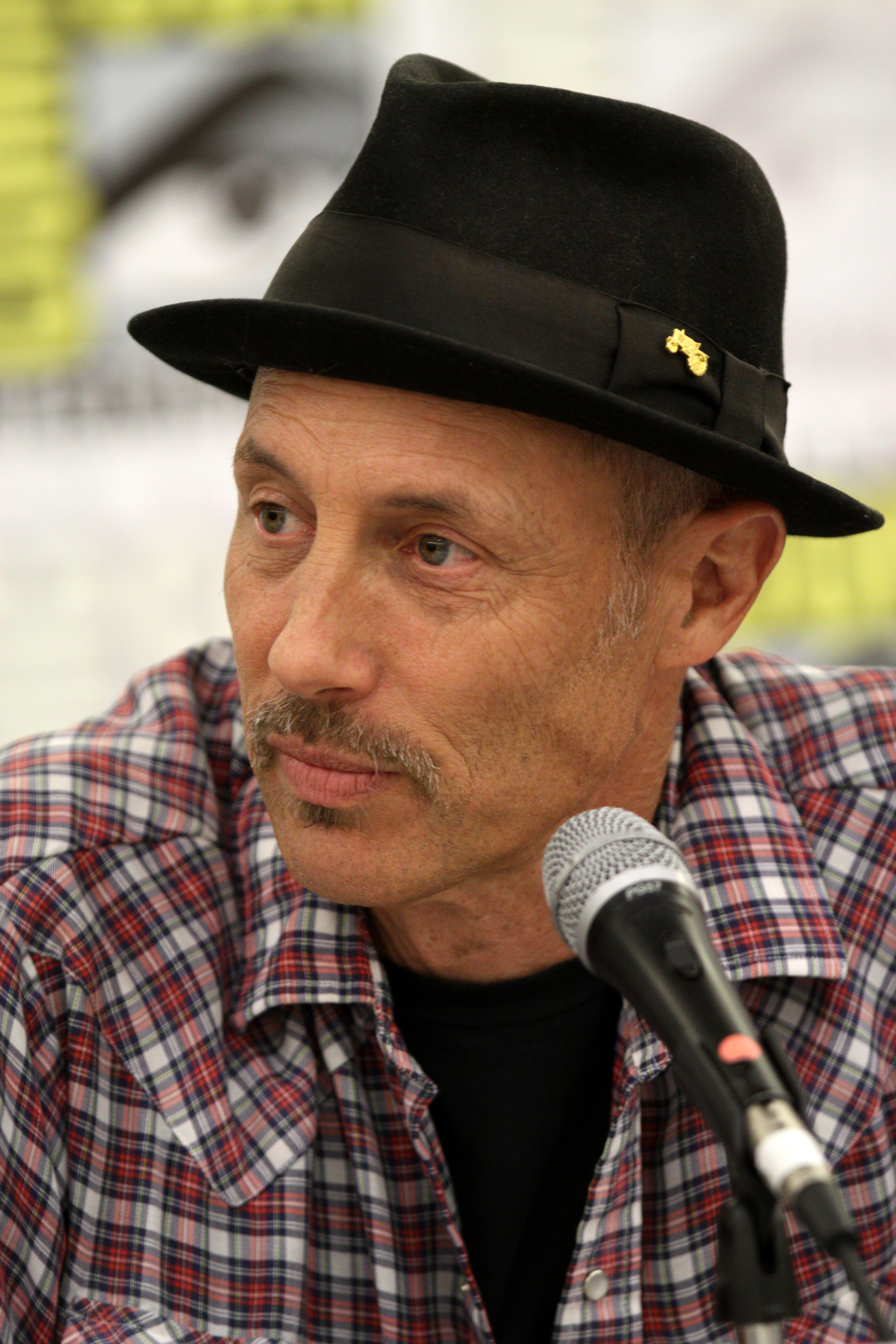
(L-R) Jennifer Coolidge, Natasha Rothwell, and Jon Gries are the only actors from The White Lotus to appear in multiple seasons, with only Gries appearing in all three.

Upon the limited series order announcement, Murray Bartlett, Connie Britton, Jennifer Coolidge, Alexandra Daddario, Fred Hechinger, Jake Lacy, Brittany O'Grady, Natasha Rothwell, Sydney Sweeney, and Steve Zahn were cast. On October 30, 2020, Molly Shannon, Jon Gries, Jolene Purdy, Kekoa Kekumano, and Lukas Gage joined the cast in recurring roles.

Upon the announcement of the second season, HBO announced that a predominantly new cast of characters would be at another White Lotus property for the second season, though White had said a few cast members from the first season might return as their characters. On October 15, 2021, Coolidge was reported to be set to return for the second season. In January 2022, Michael Imperioli, Aubrey Plaza, F. Murray Abraham, Adam DiMarco, Tom Hollander, and Haley Lu Richardson were confirmed to star in the second season. In February 2022, Theo James, Meghann Fahy, Will Sharpe, and Leo Woodall joined the cast. In March 2022, Beatrice Grannò, Sabrina Impacciatore, and Simona Tabasco joined the cast.

Upon the third-season renewal, producers confirmed that there would be a new cast of characters at another White Lotus resort. In April 2023, Rothwell was reported to be reprising her role as Belinda for the season. In January 2024, it was announced that Leslie Bibb, Jason Isaacs, Michelle Monaghan, Parker Posey, Dom Hetrakul, Tayme Thapthimthong, Carrie Coon, Miloš Biković, Christian Friedel, Morgana O'Reilly, Lek Patravadi, Shalini Peiris, Walton Goggins, Sarah Catherine Hook, Sam Nivola, Patrick Schwarzenegger, Aimee Lou Wood, Francesca Corney, Nicholas Duvernay, and Arnas Fedaravičius had joined the cast. Biković was dropped from the cast on February 2 due to his alleged support of Russia's invasion of Ukraine, and replaced by Julian Kostov. In February 2024, Scott Glenn and Lalisa Manobal were cast. In March 2024, Charlotte Le Bon joined the cast to replace Corney, as the producers wanted an actor who played older.

In December 2025, Alexander Ludwig and AJ Michalka were cast for the fourth season. In January 2026, Steve Coogan, Caleb Jonte Edwards, Helena Bonham Carter, Chris Messina, and Marissa Long joined the cast. In February 2026, Sandra Bernhard, Ari Graynor, and Dylan Ennis joined the cast. In March 2026, Vincent Cassel, Corentin Fila, Nadia Tereszkiewicz, Max Greenfield, Kumail Nanjiani, Chloe Bennet, Charlie Hall, Jarrad Paul, Heather Graham, Rosie Perez, Ben Schnetzer, Tobias Santelmann, Frida Gustavsson, and Laura Smet were cast. Bonham Carter left the cast in April 2026, shortly after filming began, when White decided that her character "did not align once on set". Variety reported that Bonham Carter and White had "creative differences" over White's demand for a boisterous performance. That same month, it was announced that Laura Dern would replace Bonham Carter, playing a new character White developed specifically for her; Dern had an uncredited voice cameo in season 2 as Michael Imperioli's character's wife. In May 2026, Ben Kingsley, Max Minghella, and Pekka Strang joined the cast, which HBO cited as the final major cast announcement for season 4. Later that month, during the Survivor 50 finale, White revealed that two fellow Survivor contestants, Charlie Davis and Kamilla Karthigesu, would appear in season 4.

=== Filming ===
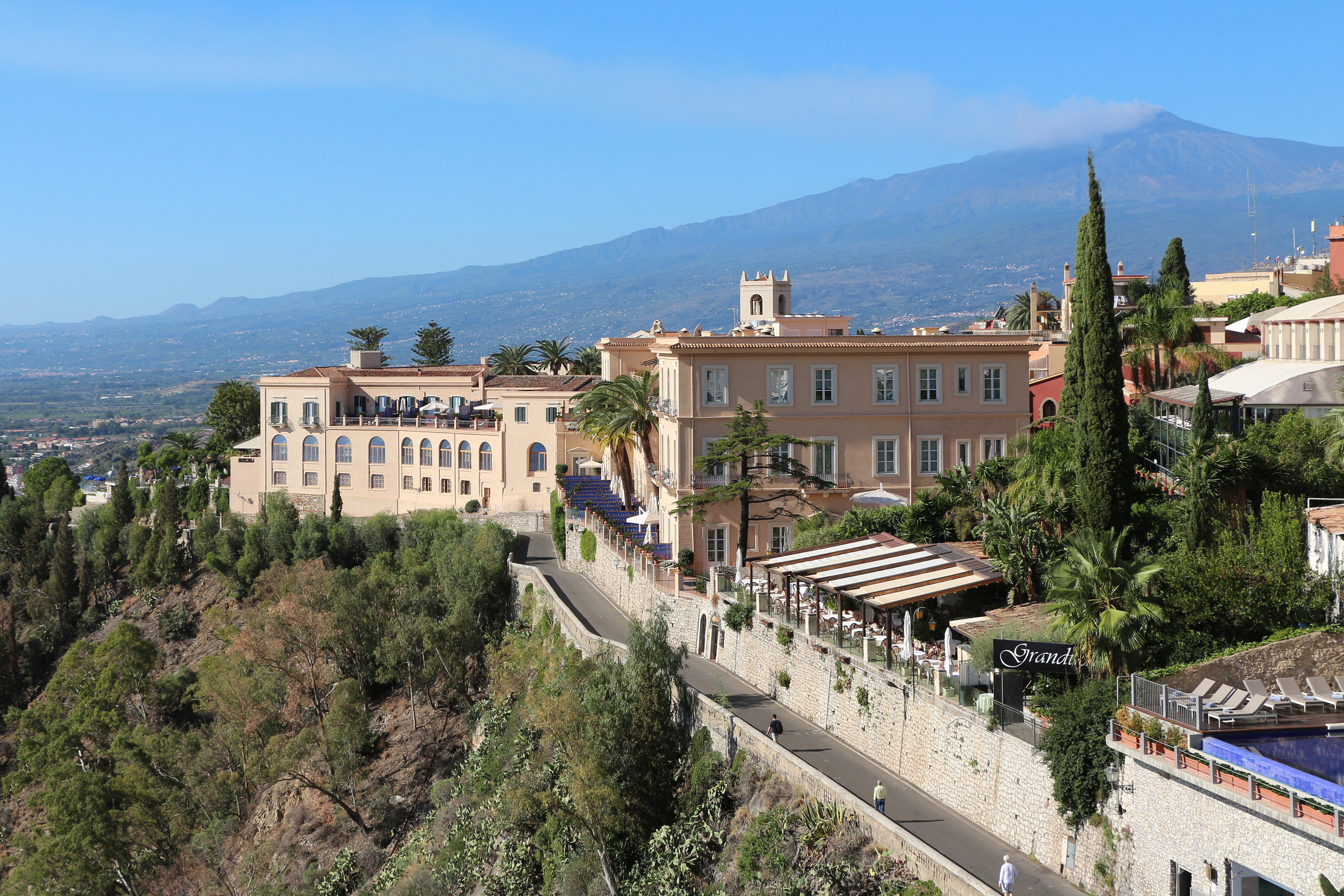
The second season was filmed at the Four Seasons San Domenico in Taormina, Sicily, Italy.

The series is mainly filmed at Four Seasons Hotels and Resorts. The creation of the show during the pandemic resulted in two major differences from the traditional process for shooting American television shows. First, American filmmakers often control costs by filming establishing shots at expensive locations and other shots on sound stages in cheaper locations. Second, when a lengthy shoot on location is necessary, the cast normally stays in long-term rented accommodations away from the set. In the case of The White Lotus, the first season's success meant that White was able to insist on continuing to shoot on location at Four Seasons resorts despite the cost. Another change carried over from season 1 is that the cast stays at the Four Seasons resort for the duration of filming, meaning they actually live together on set for several months in a luxury "theatre camp" atmosphere. This became expensive for some of the regular cast members, since HBO pays for hotel rooms but not incidental expenses. Principal photography for the first season began in October 2020 in Hawaii under COVID-19 guidelines. By November 21, 2020, the series was halfway through filming at the Four Seasons Resort Maui at Wailea and was scheduled to film in December at locations around Maui.

Season 2 was filmed at the Four Seasons San Domenico Hotel in Taormina, Sicily, Italy. Having filmed in a tightly secured bubble in season 1, the producers were not strict enough with script security during season 2; for example, too many people on set knew it was the final season for Coolidge's character, Tanya. For season 3, the script supervisor wrote "crazy fake endings" that were distributed on set, and only the actors involved in the scenes knew which endings were real.

Season 3 was filmed in Thailand, in part because the series received a $4.4 million tax incentive for filming there. Filming began in February 2024, mainly at the Four Seasons Resort Koh Samui, with other locations including Bangkok and Phuket, and wrapped in August. This was the first season for which Four Seasons openly promoted its connection to the show, since the company had seen increased web traffic, bookings, and occupancy rates at its Maui and Sicily resorts after they were featured on the show.

In November 2025, HBO confirmed that the fourth season is set in France. Filming began in April 2026 and is expected to end in October, with the Airelles Saint-Tropez, Château de la Messardière resort and the Hôtel Martinez in Cannes as the season's two White Lotus properties, with a focus on the Cannes Film Festival.

=== Music ===
White hired Chilean and Canadian composer Cristobal Tapia de Veer to score season 1. For season 2, Tapia de Veer collaborated with his manager Kim Neundorf to finish original compositions due to his own scheduling conflicts. Singer Stephanie Osorio provided the vocals. Tapia de Veer returned for the third season, but announced he would not return for later seasons due to creative differences.

=== Budget ===
According to Vulture, the second season's production costs remained under $3 million per episode, the same as season 1. Italy, where season 2 was shot, offers up to a 40% tax credit to foreign productions filmed there.

According to The Hollywood Reporter, episodes in season 3 cost between $6 million and $7 million. The third season's post-production work occurred on Kauai, in an improvised editing bay in a timeshare unit across the street from White's house, which qualified for a $550,000 tax credit from the Hawaiian government.

== Release ==
The series premiered on July 11, 2021, on HBO and HBO Max. In the United Kingdom and the Republic of Ireland, it premiered on Sky Atlantic on August 16, 2021. Season 2 premiered on October 30, 2022. Season 3 premiered on February 16, 2025, with episodes airing weekly.

=== Home media ===
The first season was released on DVD on September 13, 2022.

== Reception ==
=== Critical response ===
Critical response of The White Lotus
| Season | Rotten Tomatoes | Metacritic |
|---|---|---|
| 1 | 90% (97 reviews) | 82 (39 reviews) |
| 2 | 94% (124 reviews) | 81 (40 reviews) |
| 3 | 86% (190 reviews) | 77 (46 reviews) |

==== Season 1 ====
Review aggregator Rotten Tomatoes reports an approval rating of 90% for the first season of The White Lotus based on 97 critic reviews. The website's critics consensus reads, "Though its true intentions can get a bit murky, gorgeous vistas, twisty drama, and a pitch perfect cast make The White Lotus a compelling—if uncomfortable—viewing destination." On Metacritic, the season has a score of 82 out of 100 based on 39 critics, indicating "universal acclaim".

==== Season 2 ====
For the second season, Rotten Tomatoes reported a 94% approval rating based on 124 reviews. The website's critics consensus reads, "Swapping its tropical trappings for Euro chic while focusing primarily on the corrosive influence of carnal desire, The White Lotus remains a cookie full of arsenic that goes down smooth." On Metacritic, the season has a score of 81 out of 100 based on 40 critics, indicating "universal acclaim".

==== Season 3 ====
For the third season, Rotten Tomatoes reported an 86% approval rating based on 190 reviews. The website's critics consensus reads, "Darker and more patient with its storytelling than previous seasons while brandishing a superb new ensemble full of acidic performances, The White Lotus' third season offers a spiritual respite that shivs the soul." On Metacritic, the season has a score of 77 out of 100 based on 46 critics, indicating "generally favorable" reviews.

=== Accolades ===
The first season received 11 nominations at the 74th Primetime Emmy Awards in the limited or anthology series categories. It was also nominated for nine Primetime Creative Arts Emmy Awards across eight categories, winning five. The series won the most Emmys across both ceremonies, including Outstanding Limited or Anthology Series, Murray Bartlett for Primetime Emmy Award for Outstanding Supporting Actor, Jennifer Coolidge for Outstanding Supporting Actress, and Mike White for both Outstanding Directing and Outstanding Writing. Connie Britton, Alexandra Daddario, Jake Lacy, Natasha Rothwell, Sydney Sweeney, and Steve Zahn also received acting nominations.

The second season received 12 nominations at the 75th Primetime Emmy Awards across five categories and 11 nominations at the Primetime Creative Arts Emmy Awards across 10 categories, moving from limited/anthology series to drama series. It won four awards at the Creative Arts Emmys. For the Primetime Emmys, Coolidge won for Outstanding Supporting Actress. Other nominations included Outstanding Drama Series; F. Murray Abraham, Michael Imperioli, Theo James, and Will Sharpe for Outstanding Supporting Actor; Meghann Fahy, Sabrina Impacciatore, Aubrey Plaza, and Simona Tabasco for Outstanding Supporting Actress; and White for Outstanding Directing and Outstanding Writing for the episode "Arrivederci".

The third season received 10 nominations at the 77th Primetime Emmy Awards and 13 nominations at the 77th Primetime Creative Arts Emmy Awards. It was nominated for Outstanding Drama Series, and received several acting nominations, including Walton Goggins, Jason Isaacs, and Sam Rockwell for Outstanding Supporting Actor in a Drama Series; Carrie Coon, Parker Posey, Natasha Rothwell, and Aimee Lou Wood for Outstanding Supporting Actress in a Drama Series; and Scott Glenn for Outstanding Guest Actor in a Drama Series. Mike White was nominated for Outstanding Directing (for the episode "Amor Fati") and Outstanding Writing (for "Full-Moon Party"). The series' only win at the Emmys was for Outstanding Original Main Title Theme Music composed by Cristobal Tapia de Veer.

The series was included in the American Film Institute Awards' top ten Programs of the Year list for 2021 and 2022. Other nominations include three Critics' Choice Television Awards (winning all), five Golden Globe Awards (winning two), and a People's Choice Award.

== See also ==
- List of Primetime Emmy Awards received by HBO
