= Leo Woodall =

British actor (born 1996)

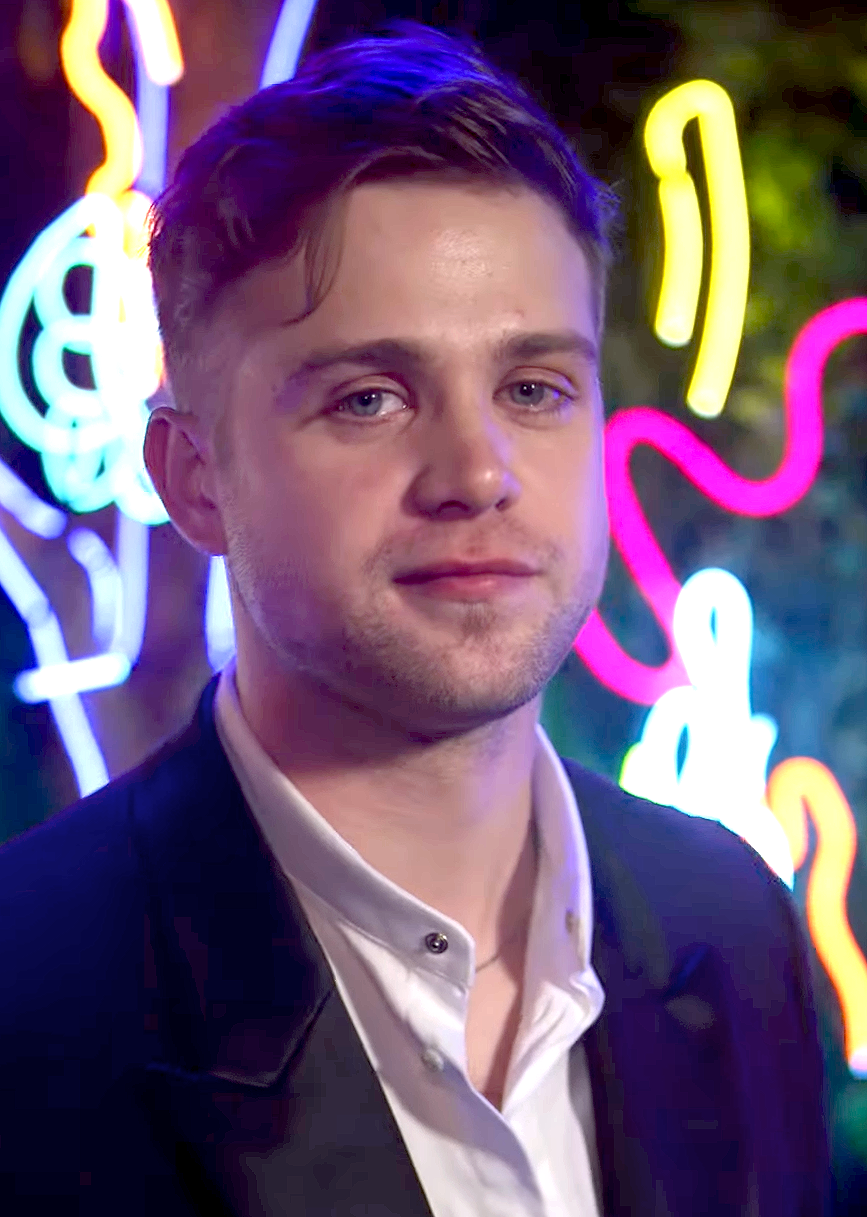
- Woodall in 2024
- Born: Leo Vincent Woodall; 14 September 1996 (age 30); London, England
- Education: ArtsEd (BA)
- Occupation: Actor
- Years active: 2019–present
- Partner: Meghann Fahy

Leo Vincent Woodall (born 14 September 1996) is an English actor. He gained recognition with his roles in the second season of the HBO black comedy drama anthology television series The White Lotus and in the Netflix romantic drama miniseries One Day. Woodall has since starred in the Apple TV+ thriller series Prime Target, and in films including the romantic comedy Bridget Jones: Mad About the Boy and the crime thriller Tuner.

== Early life and education ==
Leo Vincent Woodall was born in Hammersmith, London, and grew up in Shepherd's Bush, London. He comes from a family of actors, including his father Andrew, stepfather, and grandmother; his parents met at drama school. His mother, Jane, was married to actor Alexander Morton until his death in 2026.

He has said he is a descendant of Maxine Elliott.

Woodall attended Richmond Park Academy (previously named Shene School). He wanted to go into sports, but decided to pursue acting after seeing the series Peaky Blinders when he was 19. He graduated with a Bachelor of Arts in acting from Arts Educational School (ArtsEd) in 2019.

== Career ==
Woodall made his television debut with a guest appearance in a 2019 episode of the BBC One medical soap opera Holby City. He also appeared in the short film Man Down. That summer he was cast in the upcoming feature film Nomad out of 28,000 submissions. Filming took place in more than 20 countries.

In the meantime Woodall made his feature film debut in Cherry, directed by the Russo brothers. He played Adrian Ivashkov in the Peacock series Vampire Academy. He joined the main cast of the HBO anthology series The White Lotus for its second season in Sicily as Jack, a young man from Essex. To prepare for the role and adopt the character's accent, he watched videos of television personality Joey Essex. He was named a 2023 Screen International Star of Tomorrow. He had a recurring role in the Amazon Prime series Citadel in 2023.

Woodall starred in his first lead role as Dexter Mayhew, opposite Ambika Mod, in One Day, the 2024 Netflix adaptation of David Nicholls's novel of the same name. The series tells the story of two young people who become best friends after a platonic one-night stand. Woodall received critical acclaim for his performance. Writing for IndieWire, Proma Khosla called him "especially devastating" and "a tornado of charisma with a permanent yet never smug smirk and a romcom smolder that should send his forbears cowering at the notion". The role was a breakthrough in Woodall’s career.

In 2025, Woodall played the lead role of a mathematician in the Apple TV+ thriller series Prime Target and starred in Bridget Jones: Mad About the Boy with Renée Zellweger, playing Roxster, Jones's younger and brazen new love interest. Also in 2025, Woodall portrayed American army Sgt. Howie Triest, a German-English interpreter, in the movie Nuremberg.

== Personal life ==
In November 2023, Woodall confirmed being in a relationship with his The White Lotus costar Meghann Fahy.

== Filmography ==
=== Film ===
Key
†	Denotes films that have not yet been released

Year	Title	Role	Notes
2021	Cherry	Rodgers	
2025	Bridget Jones: Mad About the Boy	Roxster McDuff	
2025	Tuner	Niki White	
2025	Nuremberg	Sgt. Howie Triest	
2026	Tony	Sal	
2027	The Lord of the Rings: The Hunt for Gollum †	Halvard	Filming
TBA	Nomad †	Ben	Post-production
TBA	The Custom of the Country †		Post-production

=== Television ===
Year	Title	Role	Notes
2019	Holby City	Jake Reader	Episode: "Things My Mother Told Me"
2022	Vampire Academy	Adrian Ivashkov	2 episodes
2022	The White Lotus	Jack	Recurring role (Season 2)
2023	Citadel	Duke	2 episodes
2024	One Day	Dexter Mayhew	Nominated—National Film Award UK for Best Actor in a TV Series
2025	Prime Target	Edward Brooks	Main cast
2026	Vladimir	Vladimir Vladinski	Main cast

=== Audio ===
Year	Title	Role	Notes
2025	Harry Potter: The Full-Cast Audio Editions	Bill Weasley	Audible
