= Sabrina Impacciatore =

Italian actress (born 1968)

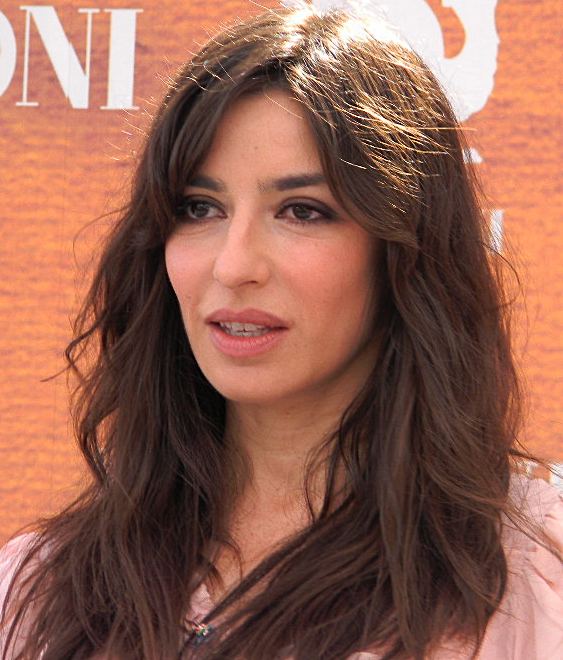
- Impacciatore at the 2010 Giffoni Film Festival
- Born: 29 March 1968 (age 58); Rome, Lazio, Italy
- Occupation: Actress
- Years active: 1988–present
- Known for: Napoleon and Me (2006); Miss F (2007); The White Lotus (2022); The Paper (2025)

Sabrina Impacciatore (Italian pronunciation: [saˈbriːna impattʃaˈtoːre]; born 29 March 1968) is an Italian actress. She is known internationally for her roles as Valentina on season two of the HBO black comedy drama series The White Lotus (2022), which earned her a Primetime Emmy Award nomination, and as Esmeralda Grand in The Paper. Impacciatore opened the 2026 Winter Olympics opening ceremony alongside international stars such as Mariah Carey and Andrea Bocelli.

== Life and career ==
Born in Rome in the Lazio Region, to a father from Abruzzo and a mother from Sardinia, Impacciatore studied acting at the Actors Studio in New York and enrolled in several other acting courses in Rome. She debuted as a teenager star, in roles of comedian and singer, in the Gianni Boncompagni's television shows Non è la RAI and Macao. She also appeared as an impersonator in several variety shows. While studying acting, she self-funded her studies working as a cleaning lady, vacuuming and preparing staging sets.

Impacciatore made her film debut in 1999, in Francesco Maselli's Il compagno.

She spoke about the challenges she faced in obtaining leading roles; especially in Sergio Castellitto's 2004 film Non ti muovere, of which she was convinced she had the leading role that ultimately went to Penelope Cruz.

In 2007, she was nominated for a David di Donatello for Best Supporting Actress her performance in Paolo Virzì's 2006 film Napoleon and Me, and one year later she received a second nomination for the same award for Wilma Labate's 2007 film Miss F.

In 2022, Impacciatore starred as Valentina in the second season of the HBO anthology series The White Lotus. She and the rest of the cast won the Screen Actors Guild Award for Outstanding Performance by an Ensemble in a Drama Series in 2023. She also received an Emmy Award nomination in 2023 for Outstanding Supporting Actress in a Drama Series for her portrayal (75th Emmy Awards), ultimately losing to co-star Jennifer Coolidge.

In early 2024, Impacciatore portrayed a fictionalized version of herself in season two of Call My Agent - Italia. In April 2024, it was announced that she had been cast as a lead in the upcoming American comedy series The Paper. In 2025, Impacciatore portrayed Elena Romano in the film G20, and Dr. Susanna Pulice in In the Hand of Dante. She participated in the 2026 Winter Olympics opening ceremony, held in Milan's San Siro stadium.

== Brand ambassador ==
She was among the performers of the 2026 Winter Olympics opening ceremony along stars like Mariah Carey, Andrea Bocelli, Cecilia Bartoli and Ghali.

In 2026, she served as a testimonial/brand ambassador alongside actor Michael Fassbender for the Italian fragrance house Acqua di Parma, appearing in “The Art of Living Italian” campaign celebrating the 110th anniversary of the brand’s Colonia fragrance.

== Filmography ==
=== Film ===
Year	Title	Role	Notes
2001	The Last Kiss	Livia	
2001	Unfair Competition	Matilde	
2003	People of Rome	Maria	
2003	Instructing the Heart	Paola	
2004	The Passion of the Christ	St. Veronica	
2005	Manual of Love	Luciana	
2006	Napoleon and Me	Diamantina Papucci	
2007	Miss F	Magda	
2007	2061: An Exceptional Year	Mara Pronesti	
2010	Kiss Me Again	Livia	
2010	18 Years Later	Mirella	
2013	Amiche da morire	Crocetta	
2014	Pane e burlesque	Mimì la Petite	
2015	Ever Been to the Moon?	Mara	
2018	There's No Place Like Home	Sara	
2021	Dog Years	Rita	
2021	7 Women and a Murder	Agostina	
2022	Turning Red	Lily	Italian dub
2022	Across the River and into the Trees	Agostina	
2022	Ragazzaccio	Cinzia	
2025	G20	Elena Romano	
2025	In the Hand of Dante	Dr. Susanna Pulice	
2026	Gail Daughtry and the Celebrity Sex Pass	Ludovica	

=== Television ===
Year	Title	Role	Notes
1997	Disokkupati	Caterina	Main cast
1997 - 2004	Ciro, il figlio di Target	Lara Croft	Parody
2002	Le ragioni del cuore	Rosamaria Ciccone	6 episodes
2008	Donne assassine	Veronica	Season 1, episode 8
2018	The Immature: The Series	Serena Serafini	Main cast
2021	Inspector Coliandro	Thea Zahra	Season 8, episode 2
2022	The White Lotus	Valentina	Main cast (season 2)
2024	Call My Agent - Italia	Herself	Season 2, episode 6
2024	Belve	Herself	Interview (season 12)
2025–present	The Paper	Esmeralda Grand	Main cast

=== Music videos ===
Year	Title	Artist	Role	Ref.
2008	"Drammaturgia"	Le Vibrazioni		
2009	"Io che amo solo te"	Fiorella Mannoia		
2019	"Baciami ancora"	Jovanotti	Livia	
2019	"Scusate se non piango"	Daniele Silvestri		

== Theatre ==
Year	Title	Role	Notes
1988	Noi, Ripellino e lo Zar		Lead role; Director: Gianfranco Evangelista
1991	Garage		Lead role; Director: A. Belforte
1993	Il boss di Bogotà		Director: Carlo Alighiero
1993	Finalmente soli		Director: Carlo Alighiero
1994	Carne di struzzo		Main cast; Director: Adriano Vianello; Teatro Tordinona, Rome
1996	Il mio boss ovvero Il boss di Bogotà		Director: Carlo Alighiero
1996	Forever Blues		Director: Maurizio Panici
1998	Telefonami in teatro		Director: Nora Venturini
1999	Il cappello di carta		Main cast; Director: Nora Venturini
2012	È stato così	The woman	Lead role; Director: Valerio Binasco
