= Meghann Fahy =

American actress (born 1990)

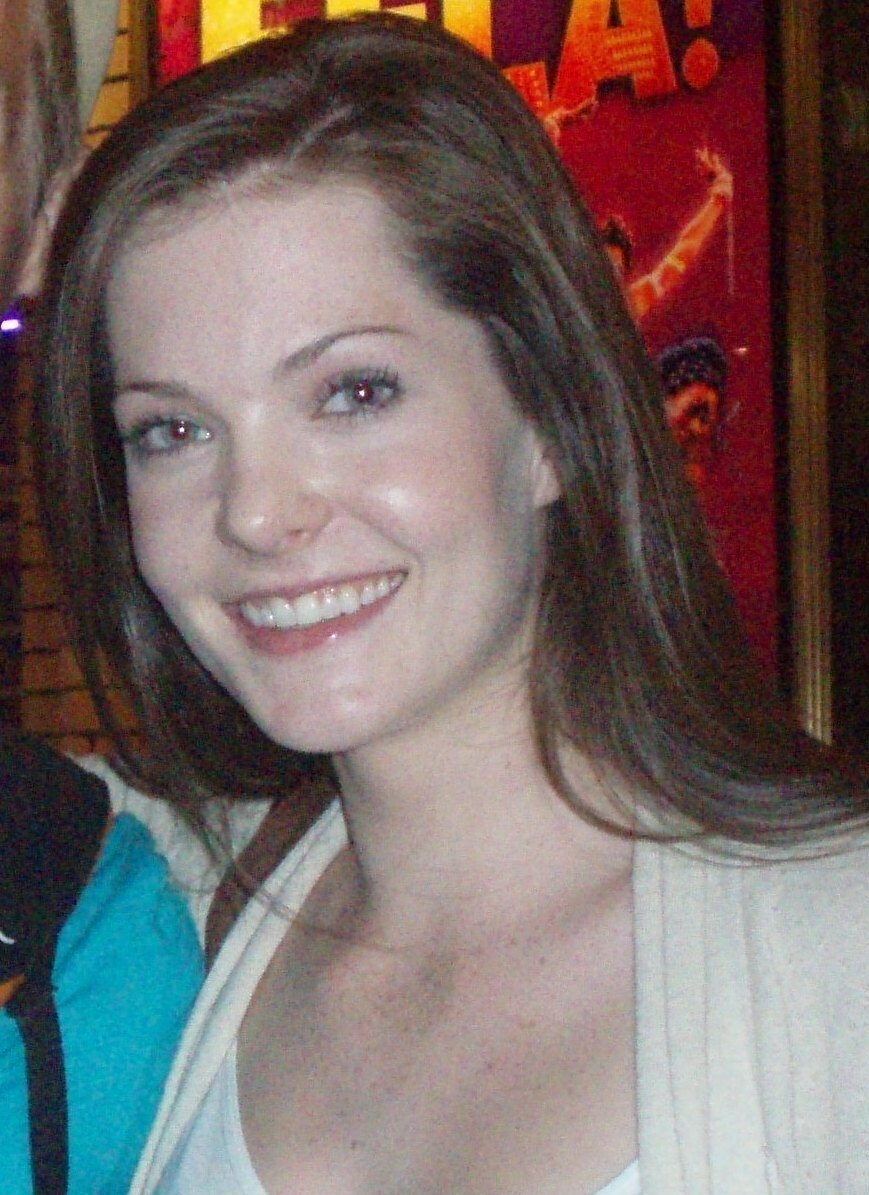
- Fahy in 2010
- Born: Meghann Alexandra Fahy; April 25, 1990 (age 36); Longmeadow, Massachusetts, U.S.
- Occupation: Actress
- Years active: 2008–present
- Partner: Leo Woodall

Meghann Alexandra Fahy (/ˈfeɪhi/; born April 25, 1990) is an American actress. She had her first prominent role playing Hannah O'Connor on the ABC daytime soap opera One Life to Live (2010–2012) and made her Broadway debut in the musical Next to Normal (2010–2011). After her first two film roles in the 2015 dramas Those People and Burning Bodhi, Fahy had her breakthrough with a starring role in the Freeform drama series The Bold Type (2017–2021).

In 2022, Fahy received critical acclaim for her starring role in the second season of the HBO anthology series The White Lotus, for which she was nominated for Primetime Emmy Award for Outstanding Supporting Actress in a Drama Series. She has since starred in the Netflix mystery series The Perfect Couple (2024), the thriller film Drop (2025), and the limited series Sirens (2025), lattermost for which she was nominated for Primetime Emmy Award Outstanding Lead Actress in a Limited or Anthology Series or Movie.

== Career ==
=== Theater ===
During the summer of 2008, Fahy attended open calls and was cast as the standby for Jennifer Damiano as Natalie Goodman in Arena Stage's production of Next to Normal in late 2008. She remained with the cast during its transfer to the Booth Theatre on Broadway, which began previews on March 27, 2009. On July 19, 2010, after Damiano departed the cast to prepare for the Broadway musical Spider-Man: Turn Off the Dark, Fahy took over as the principal actor for Natalie along with Marin Mazzie as mother Diana and Jason Danieley as father Dan. MacKenzie Mauzy replaced her as the standby for Natalie. Fahy played the role on Broadway until its closing on January 16, 2011.

In December 2010, it was announced that Fahy had been cast in readings of a stage adaptation based upon the 1992 Disney cult classic Newsies. Paper Mill Playhouse took on the musical for its 2011–12 season, with the production running from September 15 to October 16, 2011, though Fahy did not participate in that production. She has also recorded demos for composers' works, such as Bree Lowdermilk and Kait Kerrigan's The Unauthorized Autobiography of Samantha Brown in 2009, and continues to perform in concert revues as the title character as recently as March 1, 2011.

In May 2011, Fahy briefly reprised her role as Natalie Goodman in the first national tour of Next to Normal in the first week of the St. Paul, Minnesota stop. Emma Hunton, who had been cast in the tour, took a leave of absence to complete a workshop in New York City. Fahy joined the rest of the principal tour cast for her stint: Alice Ripley as Diana, Asa Somers as Dan, Jeremy Kushnier as Dr. Madden, and Preston Sadleir as Henry. In July 2011, it was announced that Fahy had been cast in The Unauthorized Autobiography of Samantha Brown at Goodspeed Opera House. She reprised her role as the title character when performances began August 4, 2011, and continued through August 28, 2011.

In January 2012, Fahy appeared in a one-night concert reading of Twilight: The Musical at New World Stages as Bella. In January 2015, Fahy participated in a production of We Are The Tigers at Feinstein's/54 Below, singing as Riley Williams.

In fall 2015, Fahy starred off-Broadway in Lost Girls at MCC Theater playing the role Penny.

In winter 2017, Fahy starred in Penelope Skinner's play Linda at Manhattan Theatre Club off-Broadway, playing a rock singer.

=== Television and film ===
Fahy first appeared on ABC's One Life to Live in February 2010 as college student Hannah O'Connor. She has described her character in these terms: "stalked an ex-boyfriend; overdosed on painkillers; has a fixation on a coed; witnessed a crime." The role ended in November 2010, with Fahy appearing as Hannah in two subsequent episodes in January 2012.

Other television credits include a guest appearance on the series Gossip Girl as Devyn. In 2011, Fahy appeared in the Hallmark Hall of Fame film The Lost Valentine as a young 1940s-era mother, Caroline Thomas, with Betty White as Caroline in present-day and Jennifer Love Hewitt as a reporter learning of Caroline's story. The following year, Fahy appeared in the miniseries Political Animals as ambitious blogger Georgia, and guest starred on Necessary Roughness as Olivia DiFlorio, tutor-turned-girlfriend of the main character's son.

In 2016, Fahy was cast as Sutton Brady in the Freeform drama series The Bold Type, which premiered on June 20, 2017. She has won praise for her performance in this role, with one reviewer noting that "Fahy, giving one of TV's most charming and underrated performances, continues to define the show's fizzy, occasionally bawdy comic streak with exquisite timing and a particular aptitude for punchlines that hurt just a little bit". In November 2020, she was cast in a co-starring role in the drama film The Unbreakable Boy.

In February 2022, Fahy was cast in a starring role playing Daphne Sullivan, a woman vacationing with her husband, in the second season of the HBO drama anthology series The White Lotus. She had auditioned for Alexandra Daddario's role in the first season of The White Lotus. Her performance in the second season was praised, with Vanity Fair proclaiming that Fahy would be the "breakout" star of the series' second season. Adrian Horton of The Guardian also lauded Fahy and declared that it was "Fahy's performance that elevates her [character] from dimensional to thrillingly unpredictable and inscrutable." Along with her castmates, in February 2023, Fahy garnered an SAG Award for Outstanding Performance by an Ensemble in a Drama Series. She also received a nomination for Outstanding Supporting Actress in a Drama Series at the 75th Primetime Emmy Awards for her performance.

In 2025, Fahy starred as the lead in the thriller film Drop. Fahy earned praise for her performance as a survivor of domestic violence, with Empire proclaiming that "her groundedness is the antidote to the film’s silliness". In November 2025, it was announced that Fahy will star in the thriller film Banquet, directed by Galder Gaztelu-Urrutia, alongside Alfie Williams, Corey Mylchreest, and Finbar Lynch, and will be produced by David Yates.

== Personal life ==
From a young age, Fahy sang at various events around her hometown of Longmeadow, Massachusetts. However, her first stage role was playing Dorothy Gale in her Longmeadow High School senior class performance of The Wizard of Oz. Fahy waited tables at The Grey Dog in New York City and nannied at the outset of her career.

In November 2023, Fahy publicly confirmed her relationship with The White Lotus costar Leo Woodall.

== Filmography ==
=== Film ===
Key
†	Denotes films that have not yet been released

Year	Title	Role	Notes
2015	Those People	London	
2015	Burning Bodhi	Lauren	
2016	Miss Sloane	Clara Thomson	
2016	Our Time	Jen	
2024	Your Monster	Jackie Dennon	
2025	Rebuilding	Ruby Rose	
2025	The Unbreakable Boy	Teresa LeRette	
2025	Drop	Violet Gates	
TBA	You Deserve Each Other †	Naomi Westfield	Post-Production
TBA	Banquet †	Jenny Cochrane	Post-Production

=== Television ===
Year	Title	Role	Notes
2009	Gossip Girl	Devyn	Episode: "The Lost Boy"
2010–2012	One Life to Live	Hannah O'Connor	Recurring role
2011	The Lost Valentine	Young Caroline Robinson Thomas	Television film (Hallmark Hall of Fame)
2011	The Good Wife	Shelby Hale	Episode: "Affairs of State"
2012	Necessary Roughness	Olivia DiFlorio	4 episodes
2012	Political Animals	Georgia Gibbons	Miniseries; 4 episodes
2012	Chicago Fire	Nicki Rutkowski	3 episodes
2013	It Could Be Worse	Joy	Episode: "What's Your Secret?"
2014	Law & Order: Special Victims Unit	Jenny Aschler	Episode: "Downloaded Child"
2015	The Jim Gaffigan Show	Maria	Episode: "Maria"
2015	Blue Bloods	Lacey Chambers	Episode: "Worst Case Scenario"
2017–2021	The Bold Type	Sutton Brady	Main role
2018	Deception	Alicia Davis	Episode: "The Unseen Hand"
2019	Just Add Romance	Carly	Television film (Hallmark)
2022	The White Lotus	Daphne Sullivan	Main role; season 2
2024	The Perfect Couple	Merritt Monaco	Main role; 6 episodes
2025	Sirens	Devon DeWitt	Main role; 5 episodes
2026	The Good Daughter	Charlotte Quinn	Main role; 6 episodes

=== Theater ===
Year	Title	Role	Venue	Ref.
2010–2011	Next to Normal	Natalie Goodman (replacement)	Booth Theatre, Broadway	
2015	We Are the Tigers	Riley Williams	54 Below, Off-Broadway	
2015	Lost Girls	Penny Lefebvre	Lucille Lortel Theatre, Off-Broadway	
2017	Linda	Stevie	New York City Center Stage I, Off-Broadway	

== Awards and nominations ==
Year	Association	Category	Project	Result	Ref.
2018	Teen Choice Awards	Choice Summer TV Actor	The Bold Type	Nominated	
2023	Screen Actors Guild Awards	Outstanding Ensemble in a Drama Series	The White Lotus	Won	
2023	Primetime Emmy Awards	Outstanding Supporting Actress in a Drama Series	The White Lotus (episode: "Arrivederci")	Nominated	
2025	Primetime Emmy Awards	Outstanding Lead Actress in a Limited or Anthology Series or Movie	Sirens	Nominated	
