= Beatrice Grannò =

Italian actress (born 1993)

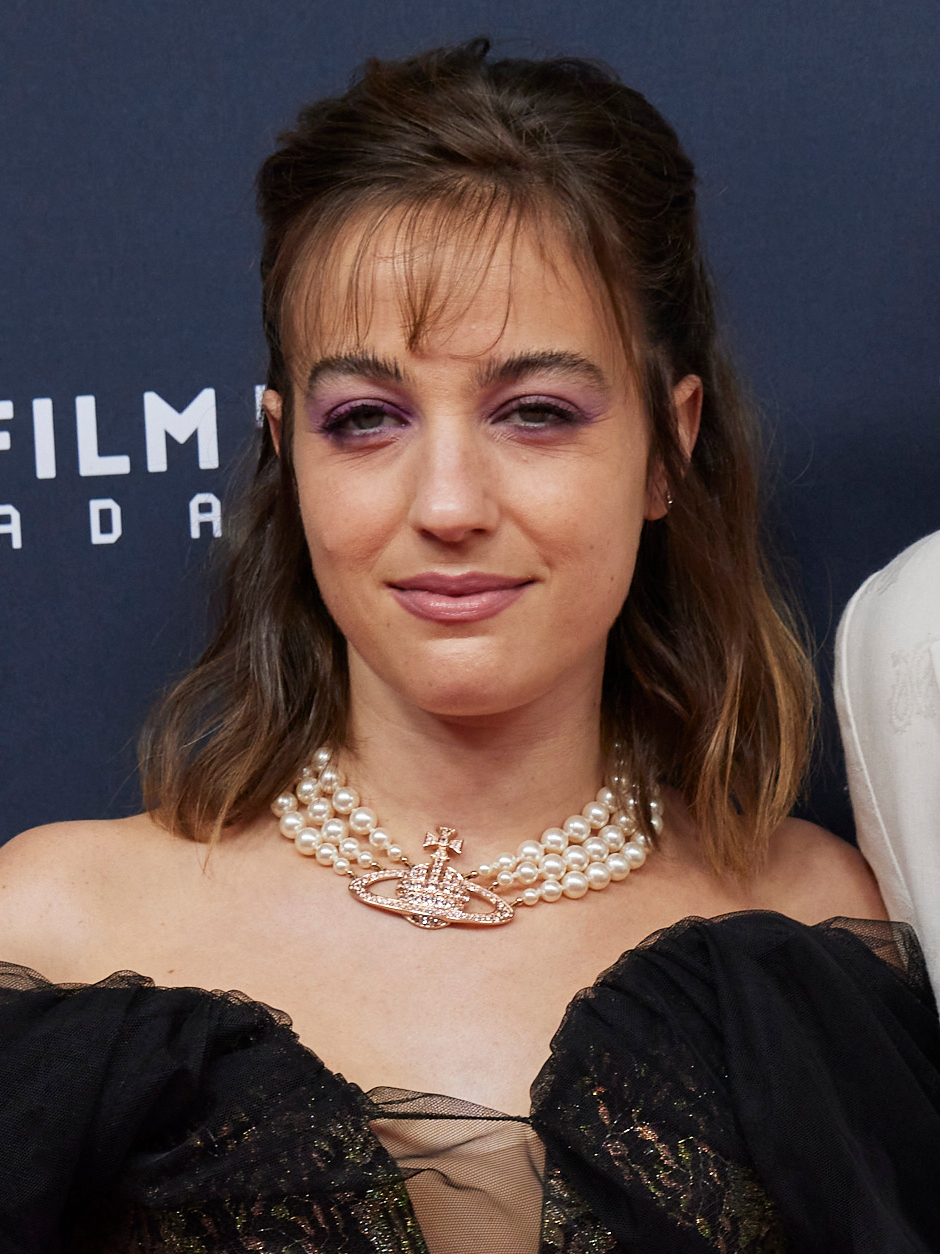
- Grannò at the 2024 Toronto International Film Festival
- Born: 6 May 1993 (age 33); Rome, Italy
- Occupations: Actress, musician
- Years active: 2013–present

Beatrice Grannò (born 6 May 1993) is an Italian actress. She is known internationally for starring as Mia in the second season of the HBO anthology series The White Lotus.

== Career ==
Born in Rome in 1993, Grannò attended a musical academy in Prato and graduated from East 15 Acting School in London in 2016. She began her stage career and made her television debut with a small role in Don Matteo in 2014. In 2018, she starred in the main cast of Rai 1's miniseries Il capitano Maria. In 2019, Grannò played her first leading role in the feature film Wonder When You'll Miss Me, directed by Francesco Fei. She starred as Carla Ardengo in the 2020 film adaptation of Alberto Moravia's novel The Time of Indifference.

Since 2020, Grannò has starred in the Italian medical drama Doc – Nelle tue mani, playing Carolina Fanti.

In 2022, Grannò had a main role in the second season of the HBO anthology series The White Lotus as aspiring lounge singer Mia.

== Filmography ==
Film
| Year | Title | Role | Notes |
|---|---|---|---|
| 2019 | Wonder When You'll Miss Me | Amanda | |
| 2019 | Tornare | Alice McNellis at 18 | |
| 2020 | The Time of Indifference | Carla Ardengo | |
| 2021 | Security | Maria Spezi | |
| 2023 | Cattiva coscienza | Luisa | |
| 2024 | Daniela Forever | Daniela | |
| TBA | Euphony | Olivia | |

Television
| Year | Title | Role | Notes |
|---|---|---|---|
| 2014 | Don Matteo | Valentina | Episode "Cyberbulli" |
| 2018 | Il capitano Maria | Lucia Guerra | Main cast |
| 2018 | School Hacks | Siry | Main cast |
| 2019 | Enrico Piaggio: An Italian Dream | Susanna Vannucci | TV movie |
| 2020–present | Doc – Nelle tue mani | Carolina Fanti | Main cast |
| 2021 | Zero | Anna Ricci | Main cast |
| 2022 | The White Lotus | Mia | Main cast (season 2) |
| 2025 | Jurassic World: Chaos Theory | Gia | Voice role |
