= Haley Lu Richardson =

American actress (born 1995)

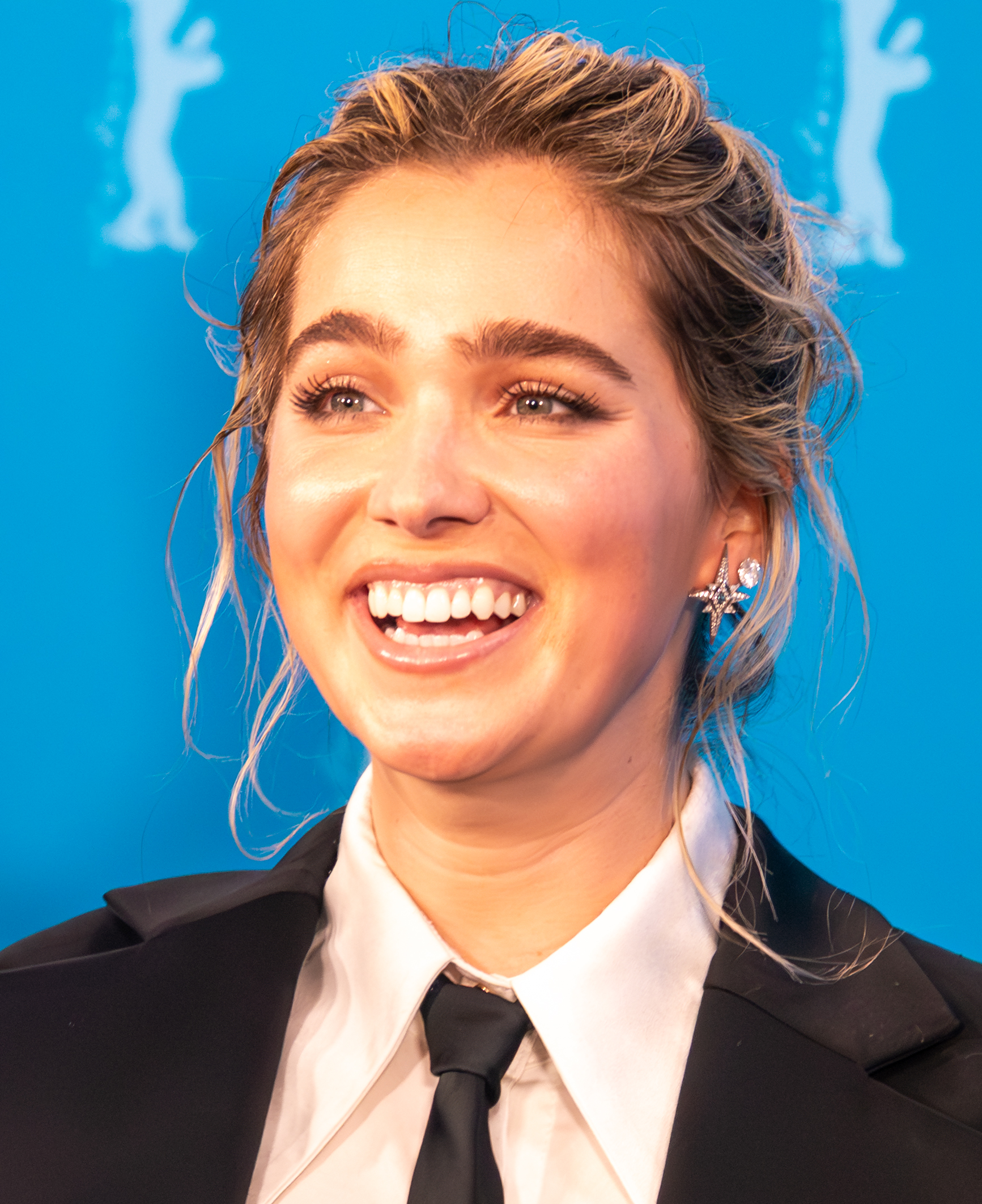
- Richardson in 2026
- Born: March 7, 1995 (age 31); Phoenix, Arizona, U.S.
- Occupation: Actress
- Years active: 2012–present

Haley Lu Richardson (born March 7, 1995) is an American actress. Following early television roles on the Disney Channel sitcom Shake It Up (2013) and the ABC Family supernatural drama Ravenswood (2013–14), she acted in the coming-of-age film The Edge of Seventeen (2016) and the psychological horror film Split (2016).

Richardson had her breakout role in the independent drama Columbus (2017), for which she received a Gotham Independent Film Award for Best Actress nomination. She continued to appear in critically acclaimed independent films such as Support the Girls (2018), Unpregnant (2020), and After Yang (2022). She also starred in the second season of the HBO anthology series The White Lotus (2022), the romantic comedy film Love at First Sight (2023), and the Peacock series Ponies (2026).

== Early life ==
Haley Lu Richardson was born on March 7, 1995, in Phoenix, Arizona. She was a regular in theatrical productions and regional dance competitions throughout the Southwest. From 2001 to 2011, she was a leading dancer in Phoenix's Cannedy Dance Company.

== Career ==
In 2013, Richardson began a recurring role as Tess in the ABC Family series Ravenswood. She appeared as a guest on Disney Channel's Shake It Up and co-starred in ABC's pilot production "Adopted". She played Julina in the Lifetime original movie Escape from Polygamy alongside Jack Falahee. In 2016, she had a recurring role as Ellie in the Freeform drama series Recovery Road. Her early film career included a leading role in The Last Survivors and supporting performances in The Edge of Seventeen and Split.

Her breakthrough came in 2017 when she starred opposite John Cho in Columbus. For her work in the film, she was nominated for the 2017 Gotham Independent Film Award for Best Actress. Reviewing Columbus in The New Yorker, Richard Brody wrote: "Richardson in particular vaults to the forefront of her generation’s actors with this performance, which virtually sings with emotional and intellectual acuity."

In 2019, Richardson starred in the romantic drama Five Feet Apart opposite Cole Sprouse. In the film, she played a cystic fibrosis patient who falls in love with a boy with the same disease.

In 2022, she played Portia in the second season of the HBO comedy-drama anthology series The White Lotus. She starred in the video for the Jonas Brothers' song "Wings" in February 2023. In November 2025, Richardson published her first collection of poetry, I'm Sad and Horny, with Simon & Schuster.

She joined the cast of Ponies in November 2024, joining Emilia Clarke. The show was canceled after one season.

== Personal life ==
Richardson has been crocheting since the age of eight, and has an Etsy shop where she sells accessories and crocheted clothing made from her own designs.

Richardson began dating Brett Dier in 2012, after they met on the set of Ravenswood. Richardson proposed to him in 2019. On the television program Busy Tonight, she said that she and Dier were not "romantic" people, and she had asked him to marry her casually over pizza. In 2022, Richardson announced that they had broken up two years earlier.

== Filmography ==
Key
†	Denotes films that have not yet been released

=== Film ===
Year	Title	Role	Notes	Ref.
2012	Meanamorphosis	Cameron	Short film	
2012	Christmas Twister	Kaitlyn		
2014	The Last Survivors	Kendal		
2014	The Young Kieslowski	Leslie Mallard		
2015	The Bronze	Maggie Townsend		
2015	Follow	Viv		
2016	The Edge of Seventeen	Krista		
2016	Split	Claire Benoit		
2017	Columbus	Casey		
2018	The Chaperone	Louise Brooks		
2018	Operation Finale	Sylvia Hermann		
2018	Support the Girls	Maci		
2019	Five Feet Apart	Stella Grant		
2020	Unpregnant	Veronica Clarke		
2021	After Yang	Ada		
2021	Montana Story	Erin		
2023	Love at First Sight	Hadley Sullivan	Also executive producer	
2025	Good Luck, Have Fun, Don't Die	Ingrid		
2026	Zi	Elle	Also producer	
2028	Miami Vice '85 †		Filming	

=== Television ===
Year	Title	Role	Notes
2012	Up in Arms	Dancer/Choreographer	Episode: "Flash Mob Parody Special"
2012	Christmas Twister	Kaitlyn	TV movie
2013	Adopted	Destiny	Unsold pilot
2013	Shake It Up	Shake It Up, Chicago! Dancer	Episode: "Quit It Up"
2013	Escape from Polygamy	Julina	TV movie
2013–2014	Ravenswood	Tess Hamilton	Recurring role
2014	Awkward	Mackenzie	Episode: "Sophomore Sluts"
2015	Law & Order: Special Victims Unit	Jenna Davis	Episode: "Decaying Morality"
2015	Your Family or Mine	Maya	Episode: "Pilot"
2016	Recovery Road	Ellie Dennis	Recurring role
2019	Jane the Virgin	Charlie	2 episodes
2022	The White Lotus	Portia	Main cast (season 2)
2026	Ponies	Twila Hasbeck	Main cast

=== Music videos ===
Year	Title	Artist	Album	Ref.
2023	"Wings"	Jonas Brothers	The Album	
