= Adam DiMarco =

Canadian actor (born 1990)

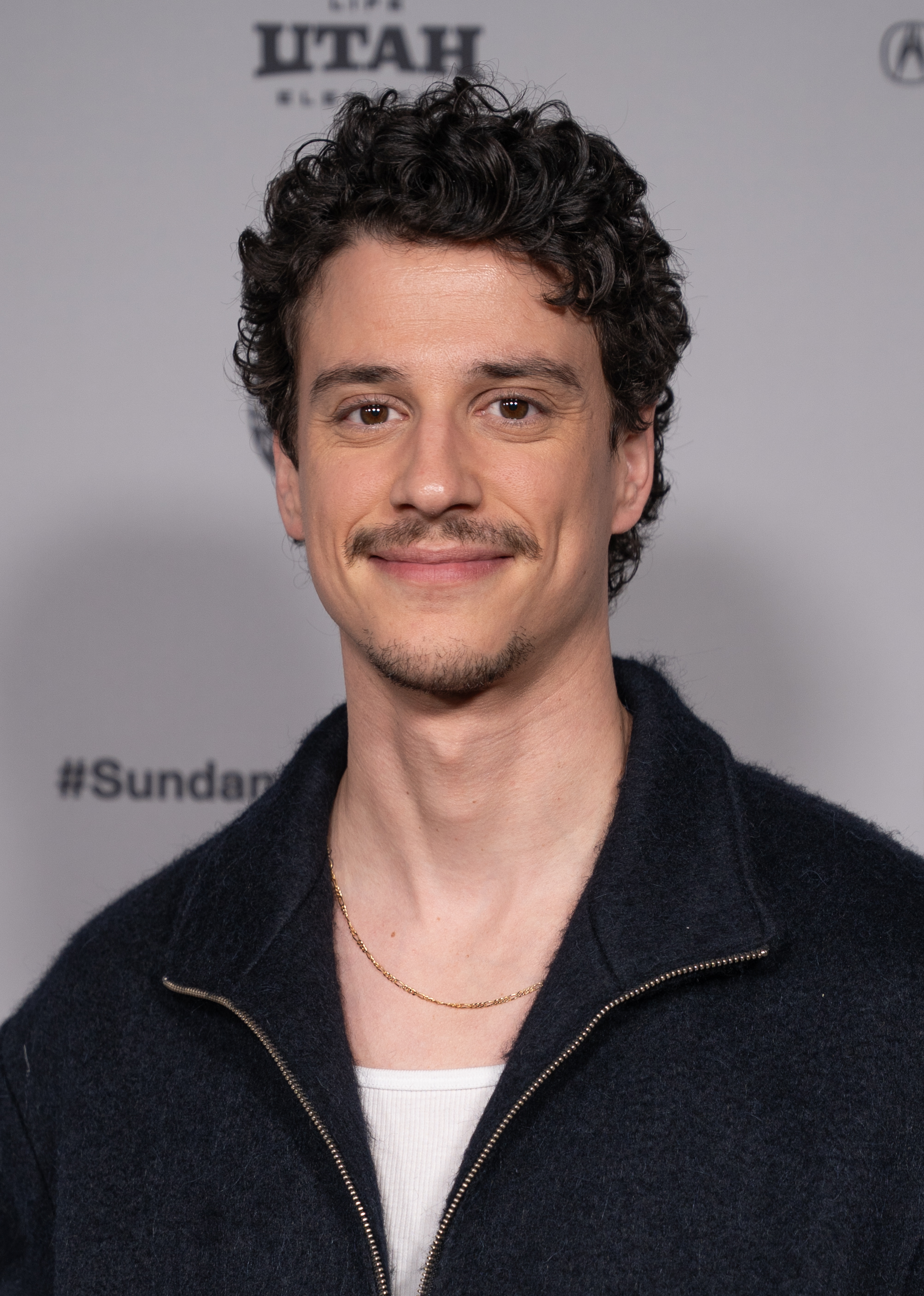
- DiMarco in 2026
- Born: April 14, 1990 (age 36); Oakville, Ontario, Canada
- Education: Vancouver Film School
- Occupation: Actor
- Years active: 2011–present

Adam DiMarco (born April 14, 1990) is a Canadian actor. He has played recurring roles in the Syfy series The Magicians (2016–2020) and the Netflix series The Order (2019–2020). He had main roles in the HBO series The White Lotus (season 2, 2022) and the Prime Video series Overcompensating (2025–present).

== Early life and education ==
DiMarco was born on April 14, 1990, and raised in Oakville, Ontario, Canada. He has said he is half Italian. He began acting in elementary school, starring in stage productions. DiMarco studied life sciences at McMaster University for a year before dropping out. Feeling unhappy, he moved to Vancouver and enrolled in Vancouver Film School to study acting.

== Career ==
Early in his career, DiMarco played Gavin, the love interest of the title character played by Debby Ryan, in the 2012 Disney Channel Original Movie Radio Rebel. He played Adam in the 2014 Disney Original Movie Zapped. He has played several recurring roles, including Kirby on the television series Arctic Air from 2012 to 2013 and Todd on the Syfy series The Magicians from 2016 to 2020.

From 2019 to 2020, DiMarco starred as Randall Carpio on the Netflix television series The Order. In 2022, he starred as Albie Di Grasso, a recent Stanford graduate who travels to Sicily with his father and grandfather to learn more about their heritage, on the second season of the HBO series The White Lotus.

== Filmography ==
=== Film ===
Year	Title	Role	Notes
2013	Kill for Me	Mark	
2013	Words and Pictures	Swint	
2014	Date and Switch	Jared	
2014	Girl House	Ben Stanley	
2016	Star Trek Beyond	Injured Red Shirt	
2019	Recess: Third Street	Randall Weems	Fan-made film
2019	Father Neptune	Dylan	
2026	Undertone	Justin Manuel (voice)	

=== Television ===
Year	Title	Role	Notes
2011–2012	R.L. Stine's The Haunting Hour	David/Mike	Episodes: "The Perfect Brother", "My Imaginary Friend"
2012	Radio Rebel	Gavin	Disney Channel Original Movie
2012	Kiss at Pine Lake	15 Year Old Tommy	Television film
2012	Killer Among Us	Cody	Television film
2012–2013	Arctic Air	Kirby Nystoruk	Recurring role, 14 episodes
2013	Supernatural	Aidan	Episode: "Freaks and Geeks"
2013	After All These Years	Alex	Television film
2014	Zapped	Adam Thompson	Disney Channel Original Movie
2014	Signed, Sealed, Delivered	Billy James	Episode: "Something Good"
2015	My Life as a Dead Girl	Zach	Television film
2015	Christmas Truce	Berkowitz	Television film
2016	Motive	Josh Martin	Episode: "The Dead Hand"
2016	Mommy's Secret	Kyle	Television film; also known as My Mom Robs Banks
2016	Second Chance	Asher Davis	Episode: "From Darkness, the Sun"
2017	Site Unseen: An Emma Fielding Mystery	Joe	Television film
2017	When We Rise	Marvin Feldman	2 episodes
2018	Olive Forever	Tom Dern	Unsold television pilot
2018	Life Sentence	Miles	2 episodes
2018	Past Malice: An Emma Fielding Mystery	Joe	Television film
2018	Secret Millionaire	Caden	Television film
2016–2020	The Magicians	Todd	Recurring role, 14 episodes
2019	Charmed	Zach	Episode: “Manic Pixie Nightmare”
2019	More Bitter Than Death: An Emma Fielding Mystery	Joe	Television film
2019–2020	The Order	Randall Carpio	Main role
2019	Chilling Adventures of Sabrina	Dario	Episode: "Chapter Nineteen: The Mandrake"
2021	The Good Doctor	Henry Campbell	Episode: "Rationality"
2022	Pillow Talk	Andy	Main role
2022	The White Lotus	Albie Di Grasso	Main role, season 2
2025–present	Overcompensating	Peter Whitney	Main role
2026	Something Very Bad Is Going to Happen	Nicholas "Nicky" Cunningham	Main role
2026	Running Point	Danny Pierce	Episode: "New Coach Who Dis"

== Awards ==
Award	Year	Category	Work	Result
Screen Actors Guild Awards	2022	Outstanding Ensemble in a Drama Series	The White Lotus	Won
