= Theo James =

British actor and producer (born 1984)

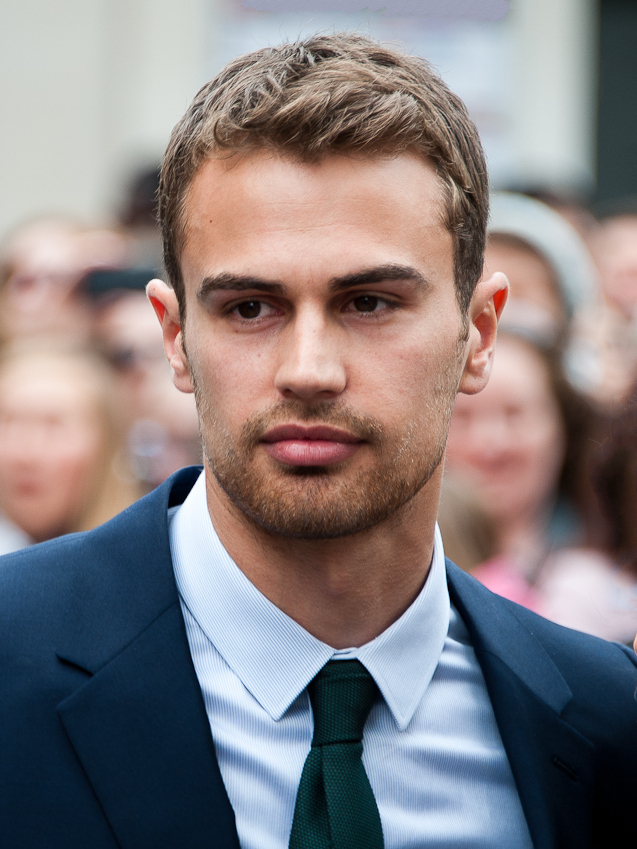
- James in 2014
- Born: Theodore Peter James Kinnaird Taptiklis; 16 December 1984 (age 41); High Wycombe, Buckinghamshire, England
- Education: University of Nottingham (BA); Bristol Old Vic Theatre School
- Occupation: Actor
- Years active: 2010–present
- Notable work: The Divergent Series; Underworld: Blood Wars; The White Lotus
- Spouse: Ruth Kearney (m. 2018)
- Children: 2

Theodore Peter James Kinnaird Taptiklis (born 16 December 1984) is an English actor and producer. He gained recognition for playing Tobias Eaton in The Divergent Series (2014–2016). He has starred in the horror films Underworld: Awakening (2012) and Underworld: Blood Wars (2016), the science fiction film Archive (2020), and the dark comedy The Monkey (2025) in a dual role as a pair of twin brothers.

In television, James appeared in the short-lived CBS crime drama series Golden Boy (2013), the romance series The Time Traveler's Wife (2022), and the dark comedy series The White Lotus (2022), which earned him a nomination for a Primetime Emmy Award. Since 2024, he has played the lead role in Guy Ritchie's action comedy series The Gentlemen.

== Early life ==
Theodore Peter James Kinnaird Taptiklis was born on 16 December 1984 in High Wycombe, England, the son of Philip Taptiklis, a business consultant from New Zealand, and Jane (née Martin), who worked for the National Health Service. His paternal grandfather was a Greek refugee who fled Greece for Syria during World War II. He is also of part Scottish descent. He has two older brothers and two older sisters.

James was raised in Askett. He attended Aylesbury Grammar School, and earned his undergraduate degree in philosophy from the University of Nottingham. He trained at the Bristol Old Vic Theatre School.

== Career ==
In 2010, James made his television debut in two episodes of A Passionate Woman. The same year he played Turkish diplomat Kemal Pamuk in an episode of the first season of Downton Abbey. His film credits include You Will Meet a Tall Dark Stranger (2010). James was cast in Stranger while still in his final year at drama school. He was named a "Star of Tomorrow" in 2009 by Screen International.

In 2011, he starred in the short-lived horror series Bedlam, playing the lead role of Jed Harper. That same year, he played James, an obnoxious night club rep, in the British comedy The Inbetweeners Movie (2011). In 2012, James appeared in the miniseries Room at the Top as Jack Wales and ITV's Case Sensitive as Aiden Harper. He was in the films The Domino Effect (2012) and Underworld: Awakening (2012), playing the role of David in the latter opposite Kate Beckinsale. He reprised David in the fifth Underworld film as the film's male lead. James starred as Detective Walter William Clark Jr. in the American crime-drama series Golden Boy (2013), which aired for one season.

James' breakthrough role was his portrayal of Tobias "Four" Eaton in Divergent (2014), a film adaptation of Veronica Roth's novel of the same name. He reprised the character in the sequel, The Divergent Series: Insurgent (2015). He returned in one more Divergent film, The Divergent Series: Allegiant (2016). James performed his own stunts in the film series.

He starred alongside Amber Heard, Billy Bob Thornton, and Jim Sturgess in the film adaptation of London Fields, and in the indie drama The Benefactor (2015), with Richard Gere and Dakota Fanning. James executive produced and starred as Michael in Backstabbing for Beginners (2018). He starred as Will Younger in the Netflix film How It Ends (2018). In 2019, James executive produced and played Sidney Parker in the British series Sanditon as a male lead. It is an eight-part period-drama adaptation of Jane Austen's final novel, written only months before her death in 1817. James did not reprise his role for the series' second and third seasons. He then executive produced and starred in the film Lying and Stealing. James launched his own film and TV production company, named Untapped, that same year.

James produced and appeared in the 2020 science fiction film Archive, playing a robotics scientist working on a secret project involving building a prototype based on his dead wife. He starred in the romance series The Time Traveler's Wife, which premiered in May 2022. The Hollywood Reporter's Angie Han described James's portrayal of the titular time traveller as "dashing and a little sardonic" and highlighted his and co-star Rose Leslie's "inability to generate any real sparks between them". James played a series regular role in the second season of the satire series The White Lotus.

In 2024, he starred as Edward "Eddie" Horniman, Duke of Halstead, alongside Kaya Scodelario, Daniel Ings, and Ray Winstone, in the Guy Ritchie television series The Gentlemen, released on Netflix. He reprised his role as the Duke of Halstead in 2026.

In 2025, James starred in a dual lead role as the twin brothers Hal and Bill Shelburn in Oz Perkins's comedy horror The Monkey.

== Other ventures ==
Outside his acting career, James was the singer and guitarist of the London-based band Shere Khan, which disbanded in 2012. In 2015, he became the brand ambassador for Hugo Boss fragrances for men, appearing in print ads and commercials, and has also appeared in the 2024 and 2025 Range Rover advertisements. James has supported UNHCR, the UN High Commissioner for Refugees, since 2016, and was appointed a Goodwill Ambassador in 2024.

== Personal life ==
Since 2018, James has been married to actress Ruth Kearney. They met at the Bristol Old Vic Theatre School. The couple have two children. The family divides their time between Los Angeles, California, and London, England.

== Filmography ==
=== Film ===
Year	Title	Role	Notes
2010	You Will Meet a Tall Dark Stranger	Ray	
2011	The Inbetweeners Movie	James	
2012	Underworld: Awakening	David	
2014	Divergent	Tobias "Four" Eaton	
2015	The Divergent Series: Insurgent	Tobias "Four" Eaton	
2015	The Benefactor	Luke	
2016	War on Everyone	Lord James Mangan	
2016	The Divergent Series: Allegiant	Tobias "Four" Eaton	
2016	Underworld: Blood Wars	David	
2016	The Secret Scripture	Father Gaunt	
2018	Backstabbing for Beginners	Michael	Also executive producer
2018	Zoe	Ash	
2018	How It Ends	Will Younger	
2018	London Fields	Guy Clinch	
2019	Lying and Stealing	Ivan	Also executive producer
2020	Archive	George Almore	Also producer
2021	The Witcher: Nightmare of the Wolf	Vesemir	Voice role
2022	Dual	Robert Michaels	
2022	Mr. Malcolm's List	Henry Ossory	
2025	The Monkey	Hal and Bill Shelburn	
2025	Rosemead	—N/a	Executive producer
2025	Fuze	Karalis	
2027	The Hole		Post-production
2027	The Bookie & the Bruiser	Rivner	Post-production

=== Television ===
Year	Title	Role	Notes
2010	A Passionate Woman	Alex "Craze" Crazenovski	
2010	Downton Abbey	Kemal Pamuk	1 episode
2011	Bedlam	Jed Harper	6 episodes
2012	Case Sensitive	Aidan Harper	2 episodes
2012	Room at the Top	Jack Wales	2 episodes
2013	Golden Boy	Walter William Clark Jr.	Lead role
2018–2021	Castlevania	Hector (voice)	Main role; 19 episodes (seasons 2–4)
2019	Sanditon	Sidney Parker	Main role (season 1); also executive producer
2019	The Dark Crystal: Age of Resistance	Rek'yr (voice)	2 episodes
2019	The Witcher	Young Vesemir (voice)	1 episode
2022	The Time Traveler's Wife	Henry DeTamble	Lead role
2022	The White Lotus	Cameron Sullivan	Main role, season 2
2024	X-Men '97	Bastion (voice)	4 episodes
2024–present	The Gentlemen	Eddie Horniman	Main role

== Theatre ==
Year	Title	Role	Notes
2017	Sex with Strangers	Ethan	Hampstead Theatre
2020	City of Angels	Stone	Garrick Theatre

== Awards and nominations ==
Year	Nominated work	Award	Result
2014	Divergent	Teen Choice Award for Choice Movie Actor: Action	Won
2014	Divergent	Teen Choice Award for Choice Movie Breakout Star	Won
2014	Divergent	Young Hollywood Award for Fan Favourite Actor - Male	Nominated
2014	Divergent	Young Hollywood Award for Best On-Screen Couple (with Shailene Woodley)	Nominated
2015	Divergent	People's Choice Awards for Favorite Movie Duo (with Shailene Woodley)	Won
2015	The Divergent Series: Insurgent	Teen Choice Award for Choice Movie Actor: Action	Nominated
2015	The Divergent Series: Insurgent	Teen Choice Award for Choice Movie Liplock (with Shailene Woodley)	Won
2016	The Divergent Series: Allegiant	Teen Choice Award for Choice Movie Actor: Action	Nominated
2016	The Divergent Series: Allegiant	Teen Choice Award for Choice Movie Chemistry (with Shailene Woodley)	Nominated
2016	The Divergent Series: Allegiant	Teen Choice Award for Choice Movie Liplock (with Shailene Woodley)	Nominated
2023	The White Lotus	Screen Actors Guild Award for Outstanding Performance by an Ensemble in a Drama Series	Won
2023	The White Lotus	Primetime Emmy Award for Outstanding Supporting Actor in a Drama Series	Nominated
