= City on Fire (TV series) =

2023 American crime drama TV series

- Promotional poster
- Genre: Crime drama
- Created by: Josh Schwartz; Stephanie Savage
- Based on: City on Fire by Garth Risk Hallberg
- Starring: Jemima Kirke; Wyatt Oleff; Chase Sui Wonders; Nico Tortorella; Omid Abtahi; Kathleen Munroe; Xavier Clyde; Alexandra Doke; Max Milner; Beth Malone; Geoff Pierson; John Cameron Mitchell; Ashley Zukerman
- Composer: Jason Hill
- Country of origin: United States
- Original language: English
- No. of seasons: 1
- No. of episodes: 8

Production
- Executive producers: Josh Schwartz; Stephanie Savage; Lis Rowinski; Jesse Peretz
- Running time: 46–57 minutes
- Production companies: Fake Empire; Apple Studios

Original release
- Network: Apple TV+
- Release: May 12 – June 16, 2023

City on Fire is an American crime drama television series created by Josh Schwartz and Stephanie Savage, based on the novel of the same name by Garth Risk Hallberg. It aired on Apple TV+ from May 12 to June 16, 2023. In August 2023, the series was canceled after one season.

== Plot ==
After Samantha Yeung was shot in Central Park, New York City on July 4, 2003, the investigation into her shooting reveals the crucial connection between a series of mysterious city-wide fires, the downtown music scene, and a wealthy uptown real estate family fraying under the strain of the many secrets they keep.

== Cast ==
=== Main ===
- Jemima Kirke as Regan Hamilton Sweeney
- Wyatt Oleff as Charlie
- Chase Sui Wonders as Samantha Yeung
- Nico Tortorella as William Hamilton Sweeney
- Omid Abtahi as Detective Ali Parsa
- Kathleen Munroe as Detective PJ McFadden
- Xavier Clyde as Mercer
- Alexandra Doke as Sewer Girl
- Max Milner as Nicky Chaos
- Beth Malone as Felicia Gould
- Geoff Pierson as Bill Sr
- John Cameron Mitchell as Amory Gould
- Ashley Zukerman as Keith

=== Recurring ===
- Michael Tow as Joe Yeung
- Alexander Pineiro as Sol
- Amel Khalil as Sherry Parsa
- Shawnee Smith as Ramona

== Production ==
=== Development ===
On June 30, 2021, Josh Schwartz and Stephanie Savage were set to write and serve as showrunners for an 8-episode TV series adaptation of Garth Risk Hallberg's novel City on Fire, with Schwartz, Savage and Lis Rowinski producing the series through Fake Empire. Apple TV+ was set to distribute the series. On October 29, 2021, Jesse Peretz was set to direct the first 2 episodes and to also produce the series. City on Fire aired from May 12 to June 16, 2023 on Apple TV+. On August 3, 2023, Apple TV+ canceled the series after one season.

=== Casting ===
On October 29, 2021, Wyatt Oleff was cast. On January 19, 2022, Chase Sui Wonders joined the cast. Additional casting was announced in March 2022.

=== Filming ===
Filming for the series began by April 2022 under the working title Brass Tactics.

== Episodes ==
No.	Title	Directed by	Teleplay by	Original release date
1	"We Have Met the Enemy, and He Is Us"	Jesse Peretz	Josh Schwartz & Stephanie Savage	May 12, 2023
2	"Scenes from Private Life"	Jesse Peretz	Josh Schwartz & Stephanie Savage	May 12, 2023
3	"The Family Business"	Haifaa al-Mansour	Josh Schwartz & Stephanie Savage	May 12, 2023
4	"Land of a Thousand Dances"	Haifaa al-Mansour	Josh Schwartz & Stephanie Savage	May 19, 2023
5	"Brass Tactics"	Liz Garbus	Josh Schwartz & Stephanie Savage	May 26, 2023
6	"Annus Horriblis"	Liz Garbus	Josh Schwartz & Stephanie Savage	May 31, 2023
7	"The Demon Brother"	Jesse Peretz	Josh Schwartz & Stephanie Savage	June 9, 2023
8	"In the Dark"	Jesse Peretz	Josh Schwartz & Stephanie Savage	June 16, 2023

== Reception ==
The review aggregator website Rotten Tomatoes reported a 39% approval rating with an average rating of 5.0/10, based on 23 critic reviews. The website's critics consensus reads, "Spread thinly across run-of-the-mill characters in an unconvincing setting, City on Fire is akin to getting doused with a cold bucket of water." Metacritic, which uses a weighted average, assigned a score of 45 out of 100 based on 10 critics, indicating "mixed or average reviews".
