= Michael (2026 film) =

Biographical film by Antoine Fuqua

- Theatrical release poster
- Directed by: Antoine Fuqua
- Written by: John Logan
- Produced by: Graham King; John Branca; John McClain
- Starring: Jaafar Jackson; Nia Long; Juliano Valdi; KeiLyn Durrel Jones; Laura Harrier; Miles Teller; Colman Domingo
- Cinematography: Dion Beebe
- Edited by: John Ottman; Harry Yoon; Conrad Buff IV; Tom Cross
- Production companies: Lionsgate Films; GK Films; Optimum Productions
- Distributed by: Lionsgate Films (United States); Universal Pictures (International) (Note: Excluding Japan and Russia, where distribution is handled respectively by Kino Films and Volga)
- Release dates: April 10, 2026 (Uber Eats Music Hall); April 24, 2026 (United States)
- Running time: 127 minutes
- Countries: United States; United Kingdom
- Language: English
- Budget: $155–200 million
- Box office: $1.029 billion

Michael is a 2026 biographical film directed by Antoine Fuqua and written by John Logan. It follows the early life of the American singer Michael Jackson, from his time with the Jackson 5 in the mid 1960s to the Bad World Tour in the late 1980s. Jackson is portrayed by his nephew Jaafar Jackson and as a child by Juliano Valdi, both in their film debuts. The supporting cast includes Nia Long, KeiLyn Durrel Jones, Laura Harrier, Miles Teller, and Colman Domingo.

Development began in November 2019, when it was reported that Graham King had secured the rights to produce a film about Jackson, with Logan attached to write. Lionsgate announced the film in February 2022. In January 2023, Fuqua was announced as the director, and Jaafar was cast as Michael. Further casting took place from January to April 2024.

After delays caused by the 2023 SAG-AFTRA strike, principal photography took place between January and May 2024. After a clause was discovered in a legal settlement, references to the 1993 child sexual abuse allegations against Michael were removed, the third act was revised, and reshoots took place in June 2025, bringing the production budget to $155–200 million.

Michael premiered at the Uber Eats Music Hall in Berlin on April 10, 2026, and was released on April 22 in the UK by Universal Pictures and on April 24 in the US by Lionsgate. It received generally mixed to negative reviews from critics, who praised Jaafar's performance but criticized the story as "sanitized". It grossed $1.029 billion worldwide, making it the highest-grossing biographical film, the first biographical film to reach $1 billion, the highest-grossing Lionsgate film and the fourth-highest-grossing film of 2026. A sequel is in development.

== Plot ==
In 1966, steel worker Joseph Jackson assembles his five sons Jackie, Tito, Jermaine, Marlon, and Michael into the musical band The Jackson 5, with Michael on lead vocals. After months of grueling rehearsals, the Jackson 5 perform until Suzanne De Passe discovers them in Chicago in 1968, and they are signed with Motown a year later. They become a huge success, allowing them to move out of their house in Gary, Indiana, and into the Hayvenhurst mansion in Encino, California, in 1971. Motown founder Berry Gordy believes Michael has more potential as a solo artist.

In 1978, Michael signs with Epic Records for his first solo album as an adult, Off the Wall, with Quincy Jones producing. Joseph restricts Michael's solo career, believing he is solely responsible for his children's fortunes, and forces him to accompany his brothers on the Triumph Tour. Feeling insecure about his appearance and developing vitiligo, Michael undergoes a rhinoplasty to shrink his nose. Following an argument with Joseph, he is advised by his bodyguard and close friend, Bill Bray, to forge his own path. In 1981, he hires John Branca as his attorney, who helps him fire Joseph via fax.

Michael visits children's hospitals and experiments with ideas for his next album. After watching a news report on the Crips–Bloods gang war, he hires members of both gangs to appear in his music video for "Beat It". Thriller breaks worldwide sales records while Michael delivers a groundbreaking performance of "Billie Jean" at Motown 25. In New York, Michael and Branca convince the CBS Records president, Walter Yetnikoff, to have MTV, which does not play videos by black artists, play Michael's music videos.

While Michael enjoys his success, Joseph meets with the boxing promoter Don King and proposes the 1984 Victory Tour to reunite his sons. King offers Joseph a PepsiCo sponsorship deal, provided that Michael tours with the Jacksons. While the Jacksons film a Pepsi commercial, a spark from the pyrotechnics sets Michael's hair ablaze, resulting in third-degree burns and nerve damage. He and Branca sue PepsiCo for damages, with the settlement proceeds going to the burn center where he was treated. While hospitalized, Michael meets the other patients as he considers whether to participate in the Victory Tour.

Michael agrees to tour with his four older brothers. At the Victory Tour's final show at Dodger Stadium that December, they perform "Human Nature" and "Working Day and Night". Michael announces it is the last time the Jacksons will perform together, severing his ties with Joseph. In 1988, Michael performs to an ecstatic crowd at Wembley Stadium as part of his first solo tour, the Bad World Tour.

== Cast ==
- Jaafar Jackson as Michael Jackson
  - Juliano Valdi as young Michael
- Colman Domingo as Joseph Jackson, Michael's father
- Nia Long as Katherine Scruse-Jackson, Michael's mother
- Miles Teller as John Branca, Michael's attorney
- KeiLyn Durrel Jones as Bill Bray, Michael's head of security/bodyguard
- Laura Harrier as Suzanne de Passe, creative assistant to Berry Gordy at Motown
- Joseph David-Jones as Jackie Jackson, Michael's oldest brother
  - Nathaniel Logan McIntyre as young Jackie
- Rhyan Hill as Tito Jackson, Michael's second oldest brother
  - Judah Edwards as young Tito
- Jamal R. Henderson as Jermaine Jackson, Michael's third oldest brother
  - Jayden Harville as young Jermaine
- Tre Horton as Marlon Jackson, Michael's fourth oldest brother
  - Jaylen Lyndon Hunter as young Marlon
- Jessica Sula as La Toya Jackson, Michael's older sister
  - Amaya Mendoza as young La Toya
- Mike Myers as Walter Yetnikoff, president of CBS Records
- Kendrick Sampson as Quincy Jones, a co-producer for three of Michael's solo albums
- Larenz Tate as Berry Gordy, music producer and president of Motown
- Liv Symone as Gladys Knight, singer and actress
- Deon Cole as Don King, a boxing promoter
- Asia Fuqua as Ola Ray (credited as "Thriller Girlfriend"), Michael's co-star in the "Thriller" music video
- Jono Petrie as John Landis (credited as "Thriller Short Film Director"), the director of the "Thriller" music video
- Paul Hipp as Bob Giraldi (credited as "Commercial Director"), the director of the "Beat It" music video and the 1984 Pepsi commercial.
- Tony von Halle as David Sosna (credited as "Thriller Short Film Assistant Director"), the assistant director of the "Thriller" music video
- Monique Lindsey as Sally, Yetnikoff's Secretary of CBS Records
- Edwin Garcia II as Miko Brando, Michael's bodyguard
- Emily Zapotocny as Sheryl Crow, 'Bad' background singer
- Cedric Stephens as Darryl Phinnessee, 'Bad' background singer
- Dennis Boyd as Dorian Holley, 'Bad' background singer
- Darrell 'Silver' Hughes as Kevin Dorsey, Vocal music director and 'Bad' background singer
- Frescia Belmar as Jennifer Batten, Michael's lead guitarist during the 'Bad' World Tour
- Armonn Livingston as Ricky Lawson, Michael's lead drummer and percussion during the 'Bad' World Tour
- Johnny Rossa as Brad Buxer, an American keyboardist and composer
- Joe Gillette as Steve Rubell, American entrepreneur and co-owner of the New York City disco Studio 54
- Kyle Burnett as Marc Benecke, doorman of Studio 54
- Nikelola Balogun as Siedah Garrett, Co-writer and background singer featured duet with Michael, "I Just Can't Stop Loving You" and "Man in the Mirror"
- Kat Graham as Diana Ross, Michael's crush/mentor, singer, member of The Supremes and 'Queen of Motown'
- Ben Kera as John Lennon, lead singer, musician and member of The Beatles
- Effie Spence as Liza Minnelli, Michael's celebrity closest friend and 'The Queen of Broadway'
- Ryan Milora as Mick Jagger, Michael's celebrity closest friend, lead singer, musician, songwriter, film producer founder member of the Rolling Stones, it's featured duet with The Jacksons 'State of Shock'
- Alexis Soto Jr. as Gregg Wright, an American blues and rock guitarist
- Jason Pfister as Halston, an American fashion designer

== Production ==
=== Development and casting ===
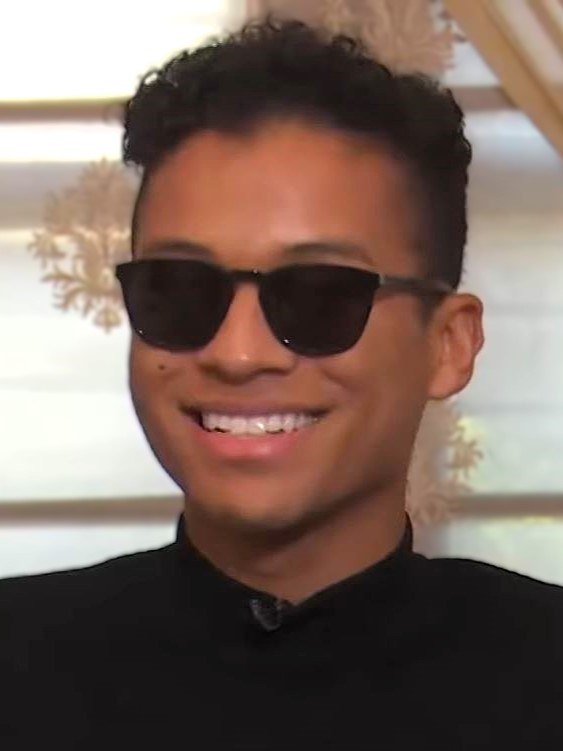
Jaafar Jackson (left, in 2020) portrays his uncle, Michael Jackson (right, in 1983).
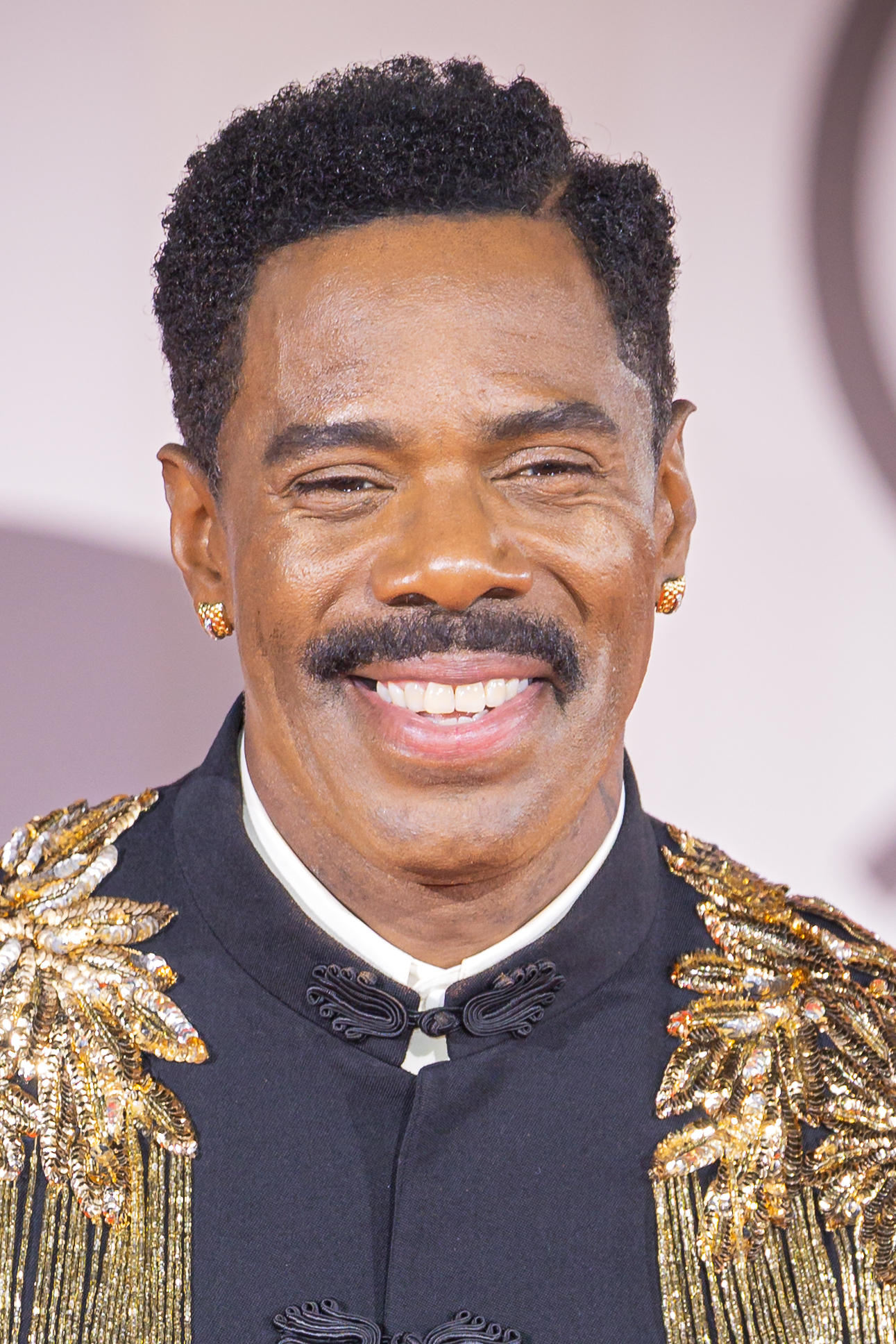
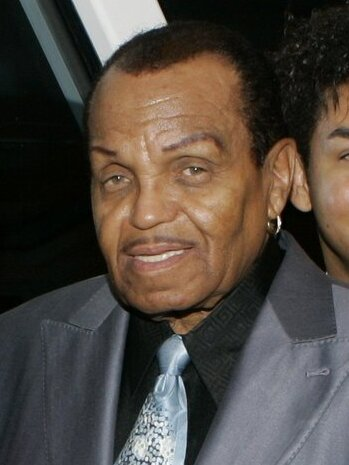
Colman Domingo (left, in 2025) portrays Joseph Jackson (right, in 2007).

In November 2019, Deadline Hollywood reported that the English producer Graham King had secured the rights to produce a film about pop singer Michael Jackson, with John Logan as the screenwriter. In February 2022, the film was announced with Lionsgate Films owning the global distribution rights. In October 2023, Lionsgate announced that Universal Pictures International was handling the international distribution. In July 2024, Deadline reported that Kino Films had agreed to a deal with Lionsgate and GK Films to distribute the film in Japan. The last theatrical film about Jackson, Michael Jackson's This Is It (2009), had been distributed by Columbia Pictures, a sister company to Jackson's record label, Sony Music. King said he had interviewed hundreds of people who knew Jackson in preparation for the film.

In January 2023, Antoine Fuqua was announced as the director. Casting began that month, with casting director Kimberly Hardin, and Jaafar was announced as Michael. Michael's mother and Jaafar's grandmother, Katherine Jackson, approved, saying he "embodies" her son. Jaafar said he was "humbled and honoured" to be cast after a two-year casting process. In January 2024, the newcomer Juliano Valdi was cast as a young Michael, with Colman Domingo as Joe Jackson and Nia Long as Katherine. In February, Miles Teller was confirmed as John Branca. The cast for the rest of the Jackson 5 was announced later that month, while much of the rest of the cast joined in March. In April 2024, Derek Luke joined as Jackson's attorney Johnnie Cochran. Kat Graham's portrayal of Diana Ross was cut due to "legal considerations".

Michael's son, Prince, was an executive producer and kept track of the film's development. His daughter, Paris Jackson, criticized the casting of Teller through a legal filing against the executors of the Michael Jackson estate (John Branca and John McClain), as it risked a portion of the estate's assets. She accused Branca of considering himself "central to the Michael Jackson story" and trying to "enrich and aggrandize himself" through such costly casting.

=== Writing ===
Earlier versions of the script included the first child sexual abuse accusations against Michael. King said he wanted to "humanize but not sanitize and present the most compelling, unbiased story". Dan Reed, the director of the 2019 documentary Leaving Neverland, which documents later allegations against Jackson, said he read a leaked script that contained "outright distortions". Domingo said Michael was not "trying to prove his innocence" but was "just trying to give a great examination of an artist, what made the artist who he is, what makes him complicated, for you to leave with your own answers". Fuqua expressed skepticism about the allegations, saying "sometimes people do some nasty things for some money". Reed said he found Fuqua's comments "kind of ironic ... If anyone's making money, it's Michael Jackson's estate and the people who worked on this biographical picture."

The plot of Michael originally began in medias res in 1993 following the first allegations, with Michael staring at his reflection as police arrive at his home in Neverland Ranch. The third act dealt with the impact of the allegations on Michael's life. However, all references to the allegations, including scenes of Luke as Cochran, were removed after a clause was discovered in a settlement with one of Michael's accusers, Jordan Chandler, forbidding any mention of Chandler by Jackson's estate in film. Rewrites were delayed after Logan's house was damaged in the Palisades Fire.

Fuqua said he was submitting his final cut when he was instructed to alter the film. Eventually, he, King, and Logan decided to have the film focus on Jackson's journey to becoming "a superhero on the stage". The script was still being revised during filming. The final script ends with Michael beginning the Bad World Tour, before the first allegations arose. Domingo said this was to focus on Michael's rise and peak. Long said it highlighted Michael's early journey and achievements while leaving the remainder of his life for a possible sequel.

Paris had no involvement and described an early script as "sugar-coated". Her script suggestions went unused. On Instagram, she criticized Hollywood biopics for shaping inaccurate narratives and containing "full-blown lies". In response, Domingo expressed hope that the film would honor her father. Michael's siblings Janet, Randy and Rebbie do not appear; according to La Toya, Janet "kindly declined" to be included.

=== Filming ===
Principal photography was scheduled to begin in mid-2023 and take place over 80 days in Santa Barbara, California. It was projected to spend $120 million on crew wages and vendors, according to the California Film Commission. Filming was delayed in September 2023 due to the 2023 SAG-AFTRA strike. Filming took place between January 22 and May 30, 2024. Dion Beebe was the cinematographer, Barbara Ling the production designer and Marci Rodgers the costume designer. Robert Richardson was originally hired to serve as the cinematographer, before he left to work on Quentin Tarantino's The Movie Critic, prior to its cancelation.

The production team shot footage depicting events from Jackson's life until 1995, including the abuse allegations and an action sequence re-enacting the 1993 police raid on Neverland Ranch. After the script was rewritten to remove references to the allegations, reshoots took place in June 2025, lasting 22 days. Lionsgate denied reports that the film was in "chaos". Following reshoots, the budget reportedly grew to $200 million, with the new sequences adding a new ending costing roughly $50 million, making it one of the most expensive biopics of all time. However, Variety reported that the reshoots only added $10–15 million to the budget, funded by the Jackson estate.

In its annual earnings call in February 2025, Lionsgate said production was nearing completion. In April 2025, it was reported that Michael could be split into two films, due to its four-hour runtime. The following month, it was delayed to 2026 with a runtime of three and a half hours. The visual effects were provided by Cinesite, Industrial Light & Magic, Folks, Rodeo FX, Rising Sun Pictures and Lola Visual Effects. Louis Morin was the visual effects supervisor. Conrad Buff IV, Tom Cross, John Ottman and Harry Yoon edited the film. In January 2026, the final writing credits were revealed: Logan received sole writing credit, with additional off-screen literary material attributed to Kenya Barris and Peter Saji.

=== Music ===
The Michael soundtrack features 13 songs, including songs by the Jackson 5 and songs from Michael's albums Off the Wall (1979), Thriller (1982), and Bad (1987). Lior Rosner wrote the underscore cues.

== Release ==
Lionsgate released a teaser trailer on November 6, 2025. It features a mashup of Michael's songs, including "Wanna Be Startin' Somethin'", "Beat It", "Human Nature", "Don't Stop 'Til You Get Enough" and "Billie Jean". It was viewed 30 million times in its first six hours and 116.2 million times in 24 hours, more than the first 24 hours of any other Lionsgate film and more than any trailer for a musical biopic or concert film in history, surpassing Taylor Swift: The Eras Tour (2023) at 96.1 million views.

Michael premiered in Berlin on April 10, 2026, and was released in the US on April 24, 2026, in IMAX. It is distributed by Lionsgate in the United States, Universal Pictures in international territories, Volga in Russia, and Kino Films in Japan. It was previously scheduled for April 18, 2025, and October 3, 2025. A first look was shown to theatre owners at CinemaCon on April 10, 2024, to positive reception. In Japan, Kino Films released Michael on June 12. It was released on Digital HD on June 9, 2026.

== Reception ==
=== Box office ===
Michael grossed $372.3 million in the United States and Canada, and $656.4 million in other territories, for a worldwide total of $1.029 billion. After making $12.6 million in the US and Canada from Wednesday and Thursday night previews, Michael made $39.5 million on its first day, surpassing Oppenheimer (2023) for the biggest opening day for a biographical film and the highest opening day of any film in 2026. It debuted at $97.2 million, the most ever for a biographical musical film, surpassing Straight Outta Compton ($60.2 million in 2015). In its second weekend, it grossed $54 million (a drop of 44%), finishing behind The Devil Wears Prada 2.

In other territories, Michael made $18.5 million by April 23, setting first-day box office records for a musical biographical film in numerous countries. It debuted at $121.6 million internationally, totalling $218.8 million worldwide. $24.4 million were from IMAX screens, the highest opening amount for a musical biographical film.

On June 7, Michael became the highest-grossing Lionsgate film, surpassing The Hunger Games: Catching Fire ($865 million). On June 14, it crossed $911.9 million globally to become the highest-grossing musical biographical film, surpassing Bohemian Rhapsody ($911 million). On June 28, it became the highest-grossing biographical film, surpassing Oppenheimer ($975 million). Michael is the fourth-highest-grossing film of 2026, behind Toy Story 5, The Odyssey and Spider-Man: Brand New Day. Jaafar Jackson became the first lead actor to debut with over $1 billion.

=== Critical response ===
Metacritic review
breakdown (unweighted)

Positive
10 (20%)
Mixed
24 (47%)
Negative
17 (33%)

On the review aggregator website Rotten Tomatoes, 38% of 311 critics' reviews are positive, with an average rating of 4.9/10. The website's consensus reads: "While Jaafar Jackson's smooth moves bring the King of Pop to uncanny life, this musical biopic mostly plays like a 'greatest hits' album that could've benefitted from including liner notes to give actual insight into the icon." Metacritic, which uses a weighted average, assigned Michael a score of 39 out of 100, based on 51 critics, indicating "generally unfavorable" reviews. Audiences polled by CinemaScore gave it an average grade of "A−" on an A+ to F scale, while those surveyed by PostTrak gave it a 90% positive score, with 84% saying they would definitely recommend it.

Owen Gleiberman of Variety called Michael a "surprisingly effective middle-of-the-road biopic". He praised Jaafar's performance, writing that he "nails the look, the voice, the electrostatic moves—and the mix of delicacy and steel that made Michael who he was". Pete Hammond of Deadline Hollywood wrote: "You are bound to leave this one dancing. And what is wrong with that?" Abhimanyu Mathur of the Hindustan Times described Michael as a "fun, soulful" film that "hits all the right notes". He praised Jaafar, but criticized the film's pacing, structure, and lack of focus on Michael's brothers. Writing for Prothom Alo, the University of Chittagong professor Moshreka Aditi Haq praised Jaafar's performance, the depiction of Michael's childhood and artistic development, and the exploration of freedom, rebellion, and creativity.

Nick Levine of NME called the film "a slick, accessible advert for Jackson's incredible imperial phase" and said the recreation of Michael's Motown 25 performance was a highlight. David Rooney of The Hollywood Reporter praised the film's performances, music, and "visual electricity", but wrote: "The film leaves itself open to accusations of making Michael a saint, which will not sit well with the cancel crowd. If you are unwilling to separate the art from the artist, this will not be a movie for you."

John Nugent of Empire called Michael "deeply generic". Peter Bradshaw of The Guardian praised the "terrific, intuitive flair" of Jaafar's singing and dancing, but called Michael a "frustratingly shallow, inert picture, a kind of cruise-ship entertainment, which can't quite bring itself to show that Michael was an abuse victim, brutalised by his father and robbed of his childhood." Writing for the BBC, Nicholas Barber called Michael "a bland and barely competent daytime TV movie", while Robert Daniels of RogerEbert.com said it was "a filmed playlist in search of a story". Clarisse Loughrey of The Independent described the film as "a ghoulish, soulless cash grab ... All Michael does is recreate, in mechanical style, the most famous visuals of Jackson's career ... Why bother to depict a human being when you can simply turn them into a product?"

Some criticized Michael for omitting the abuse allegations against Michael. Robbie Collin of the Daily Telegraph said it was not credible for a Michael Jackson biography to avoid addressing "the accusations, controversies and sadness that dogged his later life". The IndieWire critic Kate Erbland wrote that by omitting the allegations "the final film has been mostly stripped of any humanity, good and bad", calling it "glossy, sanitized, and surprisingly dull". Sean Burns of WBUR-FM likened the film ending with Michael's Bad World Tour to "an O. J. Simpson biopic [ending] with him winning the Heisman Trophy". The Guardian writer Simran Hans characterized Michael as one of several recent films that presented "sanitized" biographies of beloved musicians, such as Bohemian Rhapsody (2018), Elvis (2022) and Back to Black (2024), writing that "when it comes to objectivity, integrity and veracity, audiences will always prioritize the chance to have a singsong".

In Pitchfork, Paul A. Thompson wrote that Michael was "a string of biopic clichés and blips of unsubtle brand management" that could not be separated from "the role it presumably plays for the Jackson estate and everyone with a financial stake in Michael's catalog". He said Fuqua's implication that Michael's accusers are dishonest was "merely the clearest articulation of an ever-present subtext: that Michael ... is a victim of a vengeful 'media'". In The Root, Lawrence Ware argued that it was unfair to expect a film that covers Michael's early life to address the allegations; that critics did not make similar complaints about biopics of white musicians with "complicated histories" such as Elvis Presley and Elton John; and that critics did not recognize the craft in the film. He concluded: "This film does exactly what it should: celebrate the genius of a man who gave us countless hits. What's wrong with giving fans what they want?"

=== Accolades ===
Award	Date of ceremony	Category	Recipient(s)	Result	Ref.
Astra Midseason Movie Awards	June 30, 2026	Best Actor	Jaafar Jackson	Won	
Astra Midseason Movie Awards	June 30, 2026	Best Supporting Actor	Colman Domingo	Won	
Celebration of Cinema and Television	November 16, 2026	Actor Award – Film	Jaafar Jackson	Honored	
Golden Trailer Awards	May 28, 2026	Best Drama TrailerByte for a Feature Film	"Snap Countdown" (Lionsgate / AV Squad)	Nominated	
Golden Trailer Awards	May 28, 2026	Best Graphics in a TV Spot	"Music" (Lionsgate / AV Squad)	Nominated	
Golden Trailer Awards	May 28, 2026	Best Music	"Shine" (Universal Pictures / Lionsgate / Inside Job)	Nominated	
Golden Trailer Awards	May 28, 2026	Best Music TV Spot	"All Star" (Lionsgate / AV Squad)	Nominated	
Golden Trailer Awards	May 28, 2026	Best Sound Editing in a TV Spot	"Snap" (Lionsgate / AV Squad)	Won	
Gotham Awards	November 30, 2026	Audience Award	Antoine Fuqua	Pending	
Hochi Film Awards	December 2026	Best International Picture	Michael	Pending	
Hollywood Music in Media Awards	November 18, 2026	Song – Onscreen Performance (Film)	"Bad" from Michael – Performed by Jaafar Jackson	Won	
Hollywood Music in Media Awards	November 18, 2026	Music Supervision – Film	John Warhurst	Nominated	
Hollywood Music in Media Awards	November 18, 2026	Music Themed Film, Biopic or Musical	Antoine Fuqua	Nominated	
National Film Awards	July 1, 2026	Best Producer – Film & TV	Graham King, John Branca, Prince Jackson, and John McClain	Won	
National Film Awards	July 1, 2026	Best International Film	Michael	Nominated	
National Film Awards	July 1, 2026	Best Director	Antoine Fuqua	Nominated	
National Film Awards	July 1, 2026	Best Newcomer	Jaafar Jackson	Won	
National Film Awards	July 1, 2026	Outstanding Performance	Jaafar Jackson	Won	
Nikkan Sports Film Awards	December 27, 2026	Best Foreign Film	Michael	Pending	

== Sequel ==
Splitting Michael into two films was considered during production, but it was later decided to create a single film that could stand alone. During post-production, the ending card "His story continues" was added, which could either acknowledge Michael's further career or reference a potential sequel. In November 2025, Lionsgate chairman Adam Fogelson said Lionsgate was "not ready yet to confirm plans for a second film" but was "making sure that we're in a position to deliver more Michael soon after we release the first film". Variety reported that 30% of material from the original three-and-a-half-hour cut could be reused in a potential future film. In April 2026, Fogelson said that a sequel would depend on the critical and commercial response to the film. King acknowledged the potential for a sequel, and Logan was reported to be working on a script. Fuqua said that enough footage had been filmed to support a sequel covering Jackson's later life. On May 21, 2026, Lionsgate announced that the sequel was in development. In August 2026, it was confirmed that the film was expected to be released in late 2027 or early 2028, with production starting in either late 2026 or early 2027. Jaafar hoped the sequel would cover the abuse allegations from Michael's point of view.

== See also ==
- The Jacksons: An American Dream – 1992 miniseries directed by Karen Arthur
- Man in the Mirror: The Michael Jackson Story – 2004 television film by Allan Moyle
- Michael Jackson: Searching for Neverland – 2017 American biographical TV film
