= KeiLyn Durrel Jones =

American film and television actor

- Education: New York University Tisch School of the Arts
- Occupation: Actor
- Years active: 2008–present

KeiLyn Durrel Jones is an American film and television actor. He is best known for playing Michael Jackson's personal bodyguard Bill Bray in the 2026 film Michael.

== Life and career ==
Jones began his screen career in 2008, appearing in the short film Good Deeds. He attended the New York University Tisch School of the Arts, graduating in 2015. After graduating, he guest-starred in the Netflix superhero television series Jessica Jones. The next year, he appeared in the television programs Elementary, The Path, The Affair and High Maintenance.

In 2024, Jones starred as baggage handler and United States Air Force veteran Terrance in the Hulu comedy television series How to Die Alone, starring along with Natasha Rothwell, Conrad Ricamora and Jocko Sims. He guest-starred in television programs including Time After Time, The Other Two, Evil, Blue Bloods, Better Call Saul and City on a Hill, and played the recurring role of Kendall Roy's bodyguard Remi in the third and fourth season of HBO satirical black comedy-drama television series Succession. He also appeared in the films Sparring Partner, Oxalis and Out of the Blue.

In 2026, Jones starred as Michael Jackson's personal bodyguard Bill Bray in the 2026 film Michael, starring along with Jaafar Jackson, Nia Long, Juliano Valdi, Laura Harrier, Jessica Sula, Mike Myers, Miles Teller and Colman Domingo.

== Filmography ==
=== Film ===
Year	Title	Role	Notes
2008	Good Deeds	Chris	Short
2016	Cohab	Hunter	Short
2016	The Institution	Joseph	Short
2017	The Actor	Broadway Actor	Short
2018	Oxalis	Joe	
2019	Campfire Alpha	Kyle	Short
2019	Terzetto	Kwame	Short
2020	Sanctioned	Eric	Short
2022	Sparring Partner	Man	Short
2022	Out of the Blue	Jared	
2023	Payment in Kind	Noah	Short
2023	Fear the Night	Alfonse	
2023	Kiss My Ass	Busy Bodega Clerk	Short
2024	All of Them	Frank	Short
2024	Concept High	Future Dramaturg	Short
2025	Single AF	Cliff	Short
2026	Michael	Bill Bray	

=== Television ===
Year	Title	Role	Notes
2015	Jessica Jones	Male EMT	Episode: "A.K.A. I've Got the Blues"
2016	Elementary	Bodyguard #1	Episode: "The Invisible Hand" & "A Difference in Kind"
2016	The Path	MP	Episode: "The Shore"
2016	High Maintenance	Johnny	Episode: "Meth(od)"
2016–2017	The Affair	Officer Chris Gibbons	Episode: "304" & "308"
2017	Time After Time	Alex	Recurring Cast
2018	Sink Sank Sunk	Paul Wright	Main Cast
2018	Deception	MW Guard	Recurring Cast
2018	Shades of Blue	Handles	Episode: "The Hollow Crown"
2018	Manifest	Armed Guard	Episode: "Off Radar"
2018–2020	Better Call Saul	Blingy	Guest: Season 4, Recurring Cast: Season 5
2019	City on a Hill	Andre Benjamin	Recurring Cast: Season 1
2019	The I-Land	Clyde	Recurring Cast
2020	Savage/Love	Darren	Episode: "Tangled Up"
2021	Blue Bloods	Officer Ray Flores	Episode: "Redemption"
2021	Chicago Fire	Ken	Episode: "Smash Therapy"
2021	The Equalizer	Carter Jacobs	Episode: "Hunting Grounds"
2021–2023	Succession	Remi	Recurring Cast: Season 3, Guest: Season 4
2022	Evil	Jason Moss	Episode: "The Demon of the Road"
2022	East New York	Isaiah James	Episode: "Snapped"
2023	The Other Two	Frank	Recurring Cast: Season 3
2024	How to Die Alone	Terrance	Main Cast
