= Michael Tow =

American actor, director and producer

- Born: 3 September; Boston, Massachusetts, U.S.
- Occupations: Actor, writer, director, producer, financial planner
- Years active: 2007–present

Michael Tow is an American actor, director and producer. He is best known for his work on Paramount+’s Special Ops: Lioness, Lucky Grandma, and Hocus Pocus 2. He starred in Apple TV’s City on Fire as Joe Yeung, the father of Samantha Yeung (Chase Sui Wonders). He is also a Senior Pro Pickleball player.

== Life and career ==
Tow was born in Boston, Massachusetts. He is married with three daughters. He is of Chinese descent.

Tow's theater credits include Chinglish at Lyric Stage Company of Boston, Wild Swans at American Repertory Theater and Proof at Central Square Theater.

== Filmography ==
As actor

Year	Title	Role	Note
2007	Brotherhood	Chinese Gen	TV series
2008	En Route	Resident	Short Film
2009	JK LOL	Short Film	
2011	Edward and the Samurai Ghost	The Samurai	Short Film
2013	R.I.P.D.	R.I.P.D. Evidence Clerk	
2013	Reindeer Games	Gabe	Short Film
2014	Wander My Friends	Khan	
2014	Confounding Variable	Geoffrey	Short Film
2014	Soulmating	Mike / Morax	Short Film
2014	The Cocks of the Walk	Dickey Pham	
2015	A Killer Serve	Ray Wong	
2015	Unfinished Business	Japanese Businessman	
2015	Daredevil	Another Worker	TV series
2015	Royal Pains	Mr. Xu	TV series
2015	East of Hollywood	Ken	Short Film
2015	Master of None	Waiter	TV series
2017	MacGyver	Agent Cho	TV series
2017	My Famous Dead Boyfriend	Genghis Khan	TV series
2017	Ghost Source Zero	OT Boss	
2018	Slender Man	Calculus Teacher	
2018	Iron Fist	Clerk	TV series
2019	Blindspot	Del Toro	TV series
2019	Lucky Grandma	Little Handsome	
2019	Sound of Metal	Pharmacist	
2019	Jungleland	Kind Father	
2019	Law & Order: Special Victims Unit	Counselor Josh Wang	TV series
2020	Defending Jacob	Reporter	TV miniseries
2020	NOS4A2	Agent Chen	TV series
2020	First One In	Mr. Lee	
2020	The Blacklist	Cong Yang	TV series
2021	Free Guy	Rain Man	
2022	Blue Bloods	Mike Huang	TV series
2022	The Resident	Nathan Zhou	TV series
2022	Hocus Pocus 2	Mr. Wilke	
2022	A Father's Son	Yun Lun Kong	Short Film
2023	Mandarins	Michael Chu	Short Film
2023	Boston Strangler	JC Kim	
2023	Law & Order: Organized Crime	Wen Shao	TV series
2023	City on Fire	Joe Yeung	TV series
2023	Special Ops: Lioness	Dr. Hammond	TV series
2024	Power Book III: Raising Kanan	Jerry Kan	TV series

As filmmaker

Year	Title	Writer	Director	Producer	Notes
2013	Reindeer Games	✗	✗	✓	Short Film
2014	Soulmating	✗	✗	✓	Short Film
2015	East of Hollywood	✗	✗	✓	Short Film
2016	A-Woke	✓	✓	✓	Video Short
2017	Self-Perception	✓	✓	✓	Video Short
2017	That's Not the Nanny	✓	✓	✓	Video Short
2017	UnUnited	✓	✓	✓	Video Short
2017	Hawaii Five-Below	✓	✓	✓	Video Short
2017	ZachWashed	✓	✓	✓	Video Short
2017	Irony Fist	✓	✓	✓	Video Short
2017	Christmas Forward	✓	✓	✓	Short Film
2018	This Is Asian America	✓	✓	✓	Video Short
