= Vera Santamaria =

Television Writer, Producer, Executive Producer

- Born: Toronto, Ontario, Canada
- Education: Toronto Metropolitan University - RTA School of Media
- Occupations: Screenwriter; Producer
- Years active: 2002–present
- Website: https://www.verasantamaria.com/

Vera Santamaria is a Canadian Emmy-nominated television and feature writer. She is executive producer and Co-showrunner of How To Die Alone for ABC Signature / Hulu / Onyx Collective starring co-showrunner & EP Natasha Rothwell. She was executive producer and co-showrunner on Hulu's second season of PEN15 which garnered her an Emmy nomination for Outstanding Comedy. Her other credits include Ms. Marvel, Orange Is the New Black, Schitt's Creek, BoJack Horseman and Community. Born and raised in Toronto, Vera began her career writing for landmark Canadian shows including Degrassi: The Next Generation, Little Mosque On The Prairie. She also co-created and executive produced the first North American television series to be centered on a South Asian family, How To Be Indie.

== Career ==
Santamaria got her start in the industry working as an assistant. She was a writer's assistant to John May and Suzanne Bolch on Our Hero (CBC) as well as a production assistant and production secretary. She was assistant to Director William Phillips on the 2003 film Foolproof starring Ryan Reynolds.

=== How to Die Alone ===
Santamaria was an executive producer, writer and co-showrunner alongside show creator Natasha Rothwell on the first season of How to Die Alone. Rothwell plays Melissa, a neurotic fat Black woman who has never been in love, but after a brush with death she refuses to settle for anything less than the life she wants. How to Die Alone is produced by ABC Signature and Onyx Collective.

It was the first television show under Santamaria's Production banner Welcome Stranger and Rothwell's production banner Big Hattie Productions.

=== Ms. Marvel ===
Santamaria served as a consulting producer on Marvel's Ms. Marvel. The show stars Iman Vellani as super heroine Kamala Khan. The show is available for streaming on Disney+.

=== Roar ===
She was a writer on the Apple TV+ female-driven anthology series, Roar, based on a book of short stories by Cecelia Ahern. She wrote Episode 7 "The Woman Who Returned Her Husband" starring Meera Syal, where she returns her husband to a superstore to explore new relationships and what she's been missing in her life.

=== PEN15 ===
She was an executive producer on Hulu's critically acclaimed second season of PEN15. The series was created by stars Maya Erskine and Anna Konkle and Sam Zvibleman. In Season Two she wrote Episode 4 "Three" as well as the series finale "Home." Santamaria was nominated for a 2021 Emmy Award for Outstanding Comedy Series for PEN15. The show has won four awards including two Critics' Choice Awards and was nominated for a 2021 Writers Guild of America Award for Television: Comedy Series.

=== Orange is the New Black ===
She was a co-executive producer and writer on the final two seasons of the Netflix show Orange Is the New Black. In Season 6 she wrote Episode 8, "Gordons" and in Season 7 she wrote Episode 3, "And Brown Is the New Orange". The series stars Taylor Schilling, Laura Prepon, Uzo Aduba, Danielle Brooks, Natasha Lyonne and Kate Mulgrew among others in the ensemble.

=== BoJack Horseman ===
Santamaria served as the co-executive producer / supervising producer between 2015 and 2016 on the Netflix series BoJack Horseman In Season 2 she wrote episode 6, "Higher Love" and in Season 3 she wrote episode 2 "The BoJack Horseman Show" and episode 10, "It's You". BoJack Horseman starred Will Arnett, Amy Sedaris, Alison Brie and was nominated for awards 48 times, 3 of which were Primetime Emmys.

=== Schitt's Creek ===
She served as a consulting producer on the first season in 2015 of Schitt's Creek, starring Eugene Levy, Catherine O'Hara, and Dan Levy.

=== Community ===
Santamaria served as a producer on Community from 2011 to 2012 and wrote the episode Urban Matrimony and the Sandwich Arts.

=== How to Be Indie ===
She co-created and executive produced How to Be Indie with Suzanne Bolch and John May. Loosely based on her life, the series starred Melinda Shankar as Indie Mehta, a role that garnered her a 2013 Canadian Screen Award for Best Performance in a Children's or Youth Program or Series for the episode "How to Be the Hero". The series was nominated for various awards including the Writers Guild of Canada, the Directors Guild of Canada and Gemini Awards where in 2011 it swept wins for Best Children's or Youth Fiction Program or Series, Best Writing in a Children's or Youth Program or Series, Best Performance in a Children's or Youth Program or Series and Best Direction in a Children's or Youth Program or Series.

The series had two seasons and ran from 2009 to 2011.

=== Degrassi: The Next Generation ===
Santamaria served as a writer on Season 8 of Degrassi from 2007 to 2008 and wrote the episodes "Degrassi Goes Hollywood" and "Paradise City" starring Stefan Brogren, Aislinn Paul, and Melinda Shankar.

== Filmography ==
Year	Title	Role
2024	How to Die Alone	Executive Producer
2022	Ms. Marvel	Executive Producer
2022	Roar	Writer
2019–2020	PEN15	Executive Producer
2017–2019	Orange Is the New Black	Co-Executive Producer
2014–2016	Playing House	Co-Executive Producer
2014–2016	BoJack Horseman	Co-Executive Producer
2015	Schitt's Creek	Consulting Producer
2013, 2014	Playing House	Supervising Producer
2012, 2013	Up All Night	Producer
2011, 2012	Community	Producer
2010, 2011	Outsourced	Co-Producer
2007-2011	Degrassi: The Next Generation	Writer, Consultant, Executive Story Editor
2009-2010	How to Be Indie	Co-Creator, Executive Producer
2008-2009	Little Mosque on the Prairie	Executive Story Editor
