= Bluefields Historic District =

Historic district in Nashville, Tennessee

- U.S. National Register of Historic Places
- Location within Tennessee Location within the United States
- Location: Nashville, Tennessee
- Coordinates: 36.167222°N 86.668333°W
- Built: 1925–1974
- Architect: Multiple
- Architectural style: Ranch-style house; Minimal Traditional; Revival style; English Cottage; Colonial; Tudor architecture
- Website: historicbluefields.com
- NRHP reference No.: 16000116
- Added to NRHP: March 22, 2016

Bluefields Historic District is a historic neighborhood in Nashville, Tennessee. It was listed on the National Register of Historic Places listings in Davidson County, Tennessee (NRHP)on March 22, 2016.

== History ==
The neighborhood is located in Donelson, Tennessee neighborhood approximately six miles east of downtown Nashville. There are 247 properties within the district and the majority of them were built in the mid-20th century. The area was first platted from 1929 to 1930. The architecture includes many different styles: Ranch-style houses, Minimal Traditional, and Revival styles that exhibit English Cottage, Colonial, and Tudor architecture influences.

It was developed between 1925 and 1974, and the boundaries of the historic district are 2600–2733 Bluefield Ave., 201-279 Cumberland & 2700–2724 Overhill Circles., and 104-165 Spring Valley Dr.
