= Bill Bray (bodyguard) =

American security detail officer (1925–2005)

- Born: William Bray; February 2, 1925
- Died: November 14, 2005 (aged 80)
- Occupation: Security detail officer
- Years active: 1971–1996
- Known for: Head of security of Michael Jackson

William Bray (February 2, 1925 – November 14, 2005) was an American security detail officer best known for his long association with singer Michael Jackson.

Bray worked for the Jackson family for more than two decades and later became Michael's head of security. He regularly accompanied Jackson during concerts, tours, and public appearances, and they had a close working relationship. He retired in the 1990s. Bray was portrayed by KeiLyn Durrel Jones in the biographical film Michael (2026).

== Early career ==
Bray was a retired Los Angeles Police Department chief security officer who began working with the Jackson 5 during early 1971, through Motown. Over the following decades, he became one of Michael Jackson's closest associates and was his head of security during the height of his career.

== Michael Jackson ==
Bray was hired by Joe Jackson in early 1971 and worked with Michael until 1996, accompanying him during concerts, recording sessions, tours and public appearances.

In the 1988 autobiography Moonwalk, Jackson described Bray as "very careful and immensely professional" and wrote that he traveled with him everywhere. Rolling Stone later described Bray as Jackson's "top bodyguard" and one of his closest confidants. According to Jackson, Bray closely supervised security arrangements and often remained with him during tours and overseas travel. Author Shmuley Boteach later wrote that Bray sometimes kept Jackson isolated inside hotel rooms for security reasons while making travel preparations for upcoming tour stops.

Former associates and members of Jackson's security staff also mentioned Bray in later accounts discussing Jackson's private life and travel arrangements during the late 1980s and early 1990s. Some accounts described Bray as one of the people responsible for coordinating security and handling guests traveling with Jackson during international trips. Bray and Michael Jackson reportedly had a falling out in the mid-1990s for reasons that were never publicly disclosed. In 2004, Bray said he had not been in contact with any member of the Jackson family for at least five years, despite having originally been hired by Joe Jackson to keep his son out of trouble and protect him from harm.

== Personal life and death ==
"Bill, it's been a long long road, we have traveled throughout the years, concerts tours, meeting dignitaries, kings and queens of countries, touring around the world twice, making people happy through the gift and love of music. I'm coming of age now and really realize the importance of true love. Joseph never ever had time for me, he only saw me as always for him to make money, and as you know, Mother was a perfect mother but I never was with her, my childhood was on stage, away from Mother. What I'm simply trying to say is thank you for being a father. I don't know what would have happened to me if you were not around. I love you."

— Michael Jackson, 1992

Several publications described Bray as a "father" figure to Jackson because of Jackson's difficult relationship with his father, Joe. In a handwritten letter written in early 1992, Jackson thanked Bray for supporting him throughout his life and stated that he did not know what would have happened without him.

Bray was married to Gail. He died on November 14, 2005, at the age of 80.

== In popular culture ==
Bray was portrayed by actor KeiLyn Durrel Jones in the biographical film Michael (2026).
