= Out of the Blue (2022 film) =

- Film poster
- Directed by: Neil LaBute
- Written by: Neil LaBute
- Produced by: Tara L. Craig; Berry Meyerowitz; Larry Greenberg; Jeff Sackman
- Starring: Diane Kruger; Ray Nicholson; Gia Crovatin; Chase Sui Wonders; KeiLyn Durrel Jones; Frederick Weller; Hank Azaria
- Cinematography: Walt Lloyd
- Edited by: Kathryn Schubert
- Music by: Adam Bosarge
- Production company: Squid Farm
- Distributed by: Quiver Distribution
- Release date: August 26, 2022
- Running time: 104 minutes
- Country: United States
- Language: English

Out of the Blue is a 2022 American thriller film written and directed by Neil LaBute. It stars Diane Kruger, Ray Nicholson, Gia Crovatin, Chase Sui Wonders, KeiLyn Durrel Jones, Frederick Weller, and Hank Azaria.

== Plot ==
Connor Bates lives in the basement of his mother's house in a small American coastal town. After being in prison for three years, he can only find employment in the local library.

While jogging, Connor meets Marilyn, and the two grows attracted to each other. Marilyn is married to a wealthy businessman, and she has a stepdaughter, Astrid.

In subsequent meetings, Marilyn tells Connor that her husband abusive towards her and his own daughter. Meanwhile, a colleague at the library named Kim also seems to like Connor. Kim tells Connor that Astrid is dating the known local playboy, Jared.

As he falls in love with Marilyn, Connor suggests to her that he will kill her husband. They plan the murder together. After Marilyn takes Astrid on a trip, Connor goes to her house to kill her husband.

In the scuffle, Marilyn's husband manages to wrestle his gun away. Before he can shoot Connor, another intruder hits him on the head and instantly kills him. The second intruder, who turns out to be Jared, claims that he came here to burgle and it is a coincidence that they run into each other. Connor does not quite believe that and kills him.

Connor confronts Marilyn over a phone call, suspecting she and Astrid had sent their respective boyfriends to kill the same man, and she is hiding something from him. A few days later, Connor gets a message from Marilyn asking to meet. Their rendezvous point turns out to be a trap, with police waiting. After a chase, Connor is cornered. As he reaches for his phone, a local law enforcement officer fatally shoots him. Connor dies with the vision of Marilyn in her red swimsuit when he first saw her.

It is revealed that Marilyn and Astrid are lovers and had plotted to kill the house' patriarch for his fortune. On a private yacht, they kiss and Marilyn says nothing will come between them.

== Cast ==
- Diane Kruger as Marilyn
- Ray Nicholson as Connor
- Gia Crovatin as Kim
- Hank Azaria as Jock
- Chase Sui Wonders as Astrid
- KeiLyn Durrel Jones as Jared
- Pamela Jayne Morgan as Miss Wigham
- Frederick Weller as Deputy Fox
- Victor Slezak as Richard

== Production ==
In August 2021, it was announced that Kruger and Nicholson were set to star in the film. In September 2021, it was announced that Azaria was cast. In October 2021, it was announced that Chase Sui Wonders had joined the cast.

Filming occurred in Newport, Rhode Island in September 2021.

== Reception ==
The film has a 15% approval rating on the review aggregator website Rotten Tomatoes, based on 20 reviews.

Robert Abele of TheWrap gave the film a negative review and wrote, "If an adulterous mystery in the Cain vein isn’t going to dazzle with its dialogue or titillate with its temptations, why is it there?"

Jeannette Catsoulis of The New York Times also reviewed the film negatively and wrote, "A last-minute twist comes too late to rescue the plot; Connor, sadly, was always beyond saving."
