= How to Die Alone =

- Genre: Comedy
- Created by: Natasha Rothwell
- Showrunners: Natasha Rothwell; Vera Santamaria
- Starring: Natasha Rothwell; Conrad Ricamora; Jocko Sims; KeiLyn Durrel Jones
- Country of origin: United States
- Original language: English
- No. of seasons: 1
- No. of episodes: 8

Production
- Production companies: Big Hattie Productions; Welcome Stranger; ABC Signature; Onyx Collective

Original release
- Network: Hulu
- Release: September 13 – September 27, 2024

How to Die Alone is an American comedy series created by and starring Natasha Rothwell. The series follows a woman who has never been in love, and decides to change her life after a near-death experience. Conrad Ricamora, Jocko Sims, and KeiLyn Durrel Jones also star. It premiered on Hulu on September 13, 2024. The series received positive reception. In February 2025 the series was canceled by Hulu after one season.

== Premise ==
The story centers on Mel, a down-on-her-luck woman working at JFK airport. After a near-death experience, she decides to take control of her life and begins a journey of self-empowerment and personal transformation.

== Cast and characters ==
=== Main cast ===
- Natasha Rothwell as Melissa, also known as "Mel"
- Conrad Ricamora as Rory, Mel's best friend
- Jocko Sims as Alex, Mel's ex
- KeiLyn Durrel Jones as Terrance, Mel's co-worker, a baggage handler
- Jaylee Hamidi as Allie, Mel's friend
- Michelle McLeod as Patty, Mel's co-worker and nemesis
- Chris Powell as DeShawn, a baggage handler
- Arkie Kandola as Shaun, a baggage handler
- Elle Lorraine as Kaya, Mel's co-worker and friend
- Michael Hartney as Josh, Mel's co-worker and friend
- Melissa DuPrey as Tamika, Mel's friend

=== Guest ===
- Bashir Salahuddin as Brian, Mel's older brother
- Ellen Cleghorne as Beverly, Mel's mother
- H. Jon Benjamin as Carl, a falcon handler known as "the Birdman"

== Episodes ==
No.	Title	Directed by	Written by	Original release date
1	"Stop Living"	Jude Weng	Natasha Rothwell	September 13, 2024
2	"Lie and Deny"	Renuka Jeyapalan	Kristen Bartlett	September 13, 2024
3	"Burn Bridges"	Renuka Jeyapalan	Mara Vargas Jackson	September 13, 2024
4	"Settle"	Shahrzad Davani	Halsted Sullivan	September 13, 2024
5	"Trust No One"	Tiffany Johnson	Marquita J. Robinson	September 20, 2024
6	"Let Fear Win"	Shahrzad Davani	Jen Regan	September 20, 2024
7	"Kill Your Darlings"	Tiffany Johnson	Vera Santamaria	September 27, 2024
8	"Get Lost"	Jude Weng	Natasha Rothwell	September 27, 2024

== Production ==
How to Die Alone was created by Natasha Rothwell, known for her roles on Insecure and The White Lotus, with Rothwell serving as co-showrunner with Vera Santamaria. Both are also executive producers along with Jude Weng and Desiree Akhavan. The series is produced under Disney's Onyx Collective, ABC Signature, Big Hattie Productions, and Welcome Stranger. Rothwell stated that she wanted "to really explore the difference between loneliness and being alone" in the series. In November 2022 it was announced that How to Die Alone was picked up by Onyx Collective for an eight-episode order starring Rothwell.

The cast members were announced in February 2023. Conrad Ricamora, Jocko Sims, and KeiLyn Durrel Jones were announced as series regulars, and Bashir Salahuddin was announced as a recurring guest star.

On February 4, 2025, Rothwell announced that the series was cancelled by Hulu and described herself as shocked, heartbroken, and frankly baffled by the decision. She shared her intention to find a new home for the series.

== Release ==
How to Die Alone premiered with its first four episodes on Hulu on September 13, 2024. The streaming service later released the remaining episodes in smaller batches, with two episodes dropping each week, leading up to the finale on September 27, 2024.

== Reception ==
=== Viewership ===
TVision, which utilizes its TVision Power Score to evaluate CTV programming performance, by factoring in viewership and engagement across over 1,000 apps and incorporating four key metrics—viewer attention time, total program time available for the season, program reach, and app reach—calculated that How to Die Alone was the eleventh most-streamed series from September 16—22. It later moved to tenth place from September 23—29.

=== Critical response ===
On the review aggregator website Rotten Tomatoes, 91% of 23 critics' reviews are positive, with an average rating of 7.3/10. The website's critics consensus reads, "Leveraging creator and star Natasha Rothwell's firecracker energy for a sweet and sour character study, How to Die Alone is a handy manual for relatable viewing." Metacritic, which uses a weighted average, assigned a score of 76 out of 100, based on 13 critics, indicating "generally favorable" reviews.

Aramide Tinibu of Variety described How to Die Alone as "a witty and thoughtful dramedy about loneliness, accountability, and the courage to get out of one's own way" with Natasha Rothwell delivering a "flawless" performance. Tinubu praised Rothwell's writing, describing the series as "beautifully relatable and introspective". Tinubu appreciated the show's nuanced portrayal of airport life and its reflections on the difference between being alone and feeling lonely. Cristina Escobar of RogerEbert.com wrote that How to Die Alone offers a balance of bleak subject matter and humor, with Natasha Rothwell delivering a standout performance. She praised Rothwell's ease in delivering jokes and highlighted the talents of the supporting cast. Escobar also stated that while the show has sitcom elements, it focuses on its protagonist growth beyond romance, working on her career and relationships. She complimented the tone and called Rothwell a "fantastic leading lady," expressing hope for more seasons, especially given the need for more black sitcoms.

=== Accolades ===
Year	Award	Category	Nominee(s)	Result	Ref.
2024	Critics Choice Awards Celebration of Cinema & Television	Producer Award — Black Cinema & Television	Natasha Rothwell	Won	
2025	NAACP Image Awards	Outstanding Comedy Series	How to Die Alone	Nominated	
2025	NAACP Image Awards	Outstanding Actress in a Comedy Series	Natasha Rothwell	Nominated	
2025	NAACP Image Awards	Outstanding Directing in a Comedy Series	Tiffany Johnson (for "Trust No One")	Won	
2025	Independent Spirit Awards	Best Ensemble Cast in a New Scripted Series	Melissa DuPrey, Jaylee Hamidi, KeiLyn Durrel Jones, Arkie Kandola, Elle Lorraine, Michelle McLeod, Chris Powell, Conrad Ricamora, Natasha Rothwell and Jocko Sims	Won	
2025	GLAAD Media Awards	Outstanding New TV Serie	How to Die Alone	Nominated	
