= Hayvenhurst =

Former residence of the Jackson family

General information
- Location: 4641 Hayvenhurst Ave, Encino, California, United States
- Coordinates: 34°09′17″N 118°29′36″W
- Owner: Jackson family

Hayvenhurst is a 2-acre (0.81 ha) compound in the Encino neighborhood of the San Fernando Valley in California, United States. It became the home of the Jackson family, including Michael Jackson, who perfected the Moonwalk and recorded demos for the albums Off the Wall, Thriller, and Bad there. The compound was purchased by Jackson's father Joe in May 1971 for $140,000 (equivalent to $1.1 million in 2025) after the first commercial successes of the Jackson 5.

The estate is on Hayvenhurst Avenue, in Encino, in Los Angeles' San Fernando Valley. Its centerpiece is a 5-bedroom, 7-bathroom, 10,476-square-foot (973.3 m^{2})-building. It also includes three small stores that resemble a candy store, a puppet shop, and an ice cream shop. Additions to the property in the 1980s include a 6-foot (1.8 m) Snow White and the Seven Dwarfs diorama, a movie theater, and a koi pond.

"Hayvenhurst" was also the name of an earlier palatial estate located in West Hollywood, constructed in 1907 by W. H. Hay, the subdeveloper of Crescent Heights and the eponym of Hayvenhurst Avenue.

== History ==
The Jackson family moved to Hayvenhurst from their home in Gary, Indiana, after living in various places around Los Angeles, including several hotels, the homes of Berry Gordy and Diana Ross, and a Mediterranean-style house at 1601 Queens Road in Hollywood Hills.

Michael Jackson lived at Hayvenhurst from 1971 until 1988 when he bought the Neverland Ranch at age 29. Demos for songs for Off the Wall, Thriller, and Bad were recorded at Hayvenhurst, and Jackson undertook early development of his version of the Moonwalk there. It was once the home of Jackson's famous chimpanzee, Bubbles.

The family remained at Hayvenhurst. Jermaine Jackson lived there on and off for years. Joe Jackson left Hayvenhurst after the 1994 Northridge earthquake. In 2010, the house was appraised at $4.15 million, and then underwent extensive renovations. The following year, Katherine Jackson listed the compound for sale, asking "executors to negotiate the purchase of a new residence for her and the children, Paris, Prince and Prince Michael, known as Blanket". However, the estate has remained in the Jackson family, and as of 2019 was occupied by Michael Jackson's daughter Paris Jackson.
