= Lucky Grandma =

2019 American independent comedy-drama film by Sasie Sealy

- Directed by: Sasie Sealy
- Written by: Sasie Sealy; Angela Cheng
- Produced by: Penny B. Jackson; Milton Liu; Gilana Lobel; Joanna Lu; Gine Lui; Melvin Mar; Cara Marcous; Krista Parris
- Starring: Tsai Chin
- Cinematography: Eduardo Enrique; Mayén
- Edited by: Hye Mee Na
- Music by: Andrew Orkin
- Release date: 2019
- Running time: 87 minutes
- Country: United States
- Languages: English; Mandarin; Cantonese

Lucky Grandma is a 2019 American independent comedy-drama film written and directed by Sasie Sealy, co-written by Angela Cheng, and starring Tsai Chin. Lucky Grandma is the director's debut feature film.

== Plot ==
In New York City's Chinatown, a Chinese chain smoking grandma spends her time at the casinos but ends up in deep trouble.

== Cast ==
- Tsai Chin as Grandma
- Hsiao-Yuan Ha as Big Pong
- Michael Tow as Little Handsome
- Woody Fu as Pock-Mark
- Eddie Yu as Howard
- Mason Yam as David

== Reception ==
=== Critical reception ===
On the review aggregator website Rotten Tomatoes, it has 95% approval rating. Critics' consensus is "Lucky Grandma gives Tsai Chin a long-overdue opportunity to shine in a leading role -- but it's audiences who are the truly fortunate ones."

=== Awards and nominations ===
Award	Year	Category	Nominee(s)	Result	Ref.
Philadelphia Film Festival	2019	Best First Feature	Sasie Sealy	Nominated	
Philadelphia Film Festival	2019	Student Choice Award	Sasie Sealy	Nominated	
Napa Valley Film Festival	2019	Best Narrative Feature	Sasie Sealy	Won	
International Film Festival & Awards Macao	2019	Best Film	Sasie Sealy	Nominated	
Boston Asian American Film Festival	2019	Best Narrative Film - Audience award	Sasie Sealy	Won	
Alliance of Women Film Journalists	2021	Actress Defying Age and Ageism	Tsai Chin	Nominated	
Chlotrudis Awards	2021	Best Actress	Tsai Chin	Nominated	
