= Michael Jackson Childhood Home =

Historic house in Gary, Indiana, United States

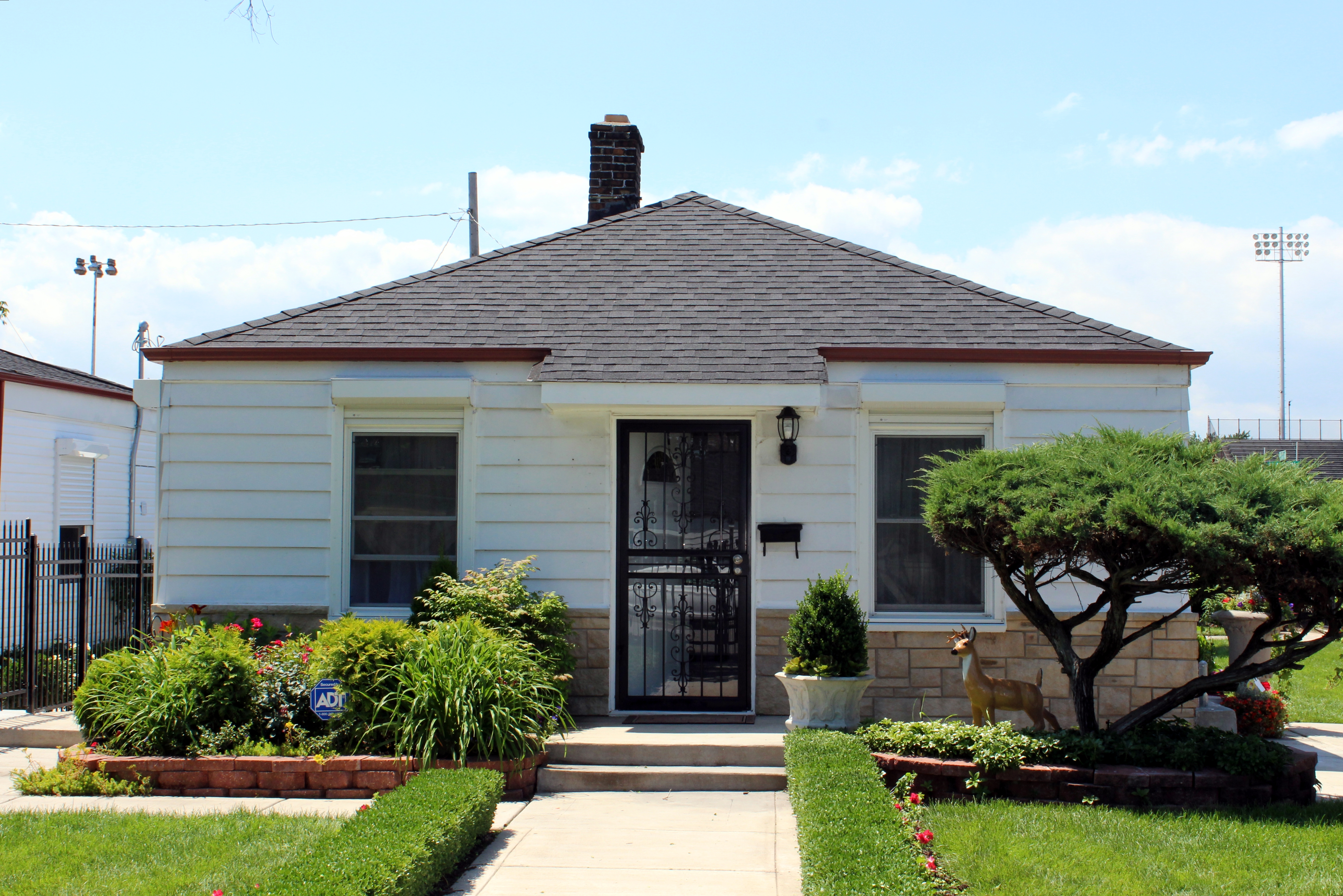
- Front of the house in June 2014

General information
- Architectural style: Minimal Traditional
- Location: 2300 Jackson Street, Gary, Indiana, U.S.
- Coordinates: 41°34′36″N 87°20′38″W
- Year built: 1949

Technical details
- Floor area: 672 square feet (62.4 m^{2})

U.S. National Register of Historic Places
- Status: Not designated; proposed by Indiana Landmarks in May 2024

The Michael Jackson Childhood Home, also known as the Jackson Family Home, is a historic house located at 2300 Jackson Street in Gary, Indiana, where American music artist Michael Jackson lived during his childhood, as well as his siblings and parents, members of the famous Jackson family.

== Description and history ==
=== General ===
Built in 1949, the house was purchased by the then newly married Joseph and Katherine Jackson in January 1950 for $8,500 (equivalent to around $117,771.91 in 2026 adjusted for inflation) With about 672 square feet (62.4 m^{2}) of living space, the one-story two bedroom bungalow became the backdrop for the early years of the Jackson family, particularly the rise of the Jackson 5, a music band of brothers who later achieved international fame. The Jacksons resided in the house until 1969 when the family's career led them to relocate to California, though Katherine Jackson still owns the house. Contrary to popular belief, the home's address of 2300 Jackson Street and its surrounding street was not named after the Jackson family but by pure coincidence was actually named after the 7th President of the United States Andrew Jackson long before the Jackson family became world famous.

On June 11, 2003, Michael Jackson made an unexpected visit to Gary for the first time since he and his family relocated from Gary in 1969. He went to Gary's City Hall to accept the Key to the City award which was presented to him by the incumbent mayor at the time Scott L. King and after a brief press conference about feeling happy to visit his home town, went to his childhood home where a family member named Tim Brown resided in the house greeted him and reminisced about his childhood in front of a crowd of one thousand people.

Over the years, the house has remained largely unchanged, while the surrounding neighborhood has changed significantly since the Jackson family's time in the city. Since Michael Jackson's death, the house has attracted visitors from around the world and evolved into a pilgrimage destination, prompting preservation initiatives to highlight the property's historic significance.

In 2010, an eight‑foot‑tall granite memorial stone honoring Michael Jackson was installed in the front yard. Later, in 2021, the Indiana Department of Transportation installed signage along Interstate 80/94 and nearby roads identifying 2300 Jackson Street as the "Home of the World-Famous Jackson 5", officially marking the site for visitors and acknowledging its cultural importance.

=== Architecture and design ===
The house, a modest Midwestern bungalow, is a clear example of the Minimal Traditional architectural style popular in postwar working-class neighborhoods. The property's interior, arranged on a single story, comprises two bedrooms, a living room, a kitchen and a bathroom within approximately 672 square feet (62.4 m^{2}). Characterized by its simple and functional design, the house features clean lines and minimal ornamentation.

=== Historic Site designation ===
In May 2024, Indiana Landmarks, through its Black Heritage Preservation Program, prepared an application seeking historic designation for the Michael Jackson Childhood Home, aiming for the property to be classified on the National Register of Historic Places.

== Gallery ==
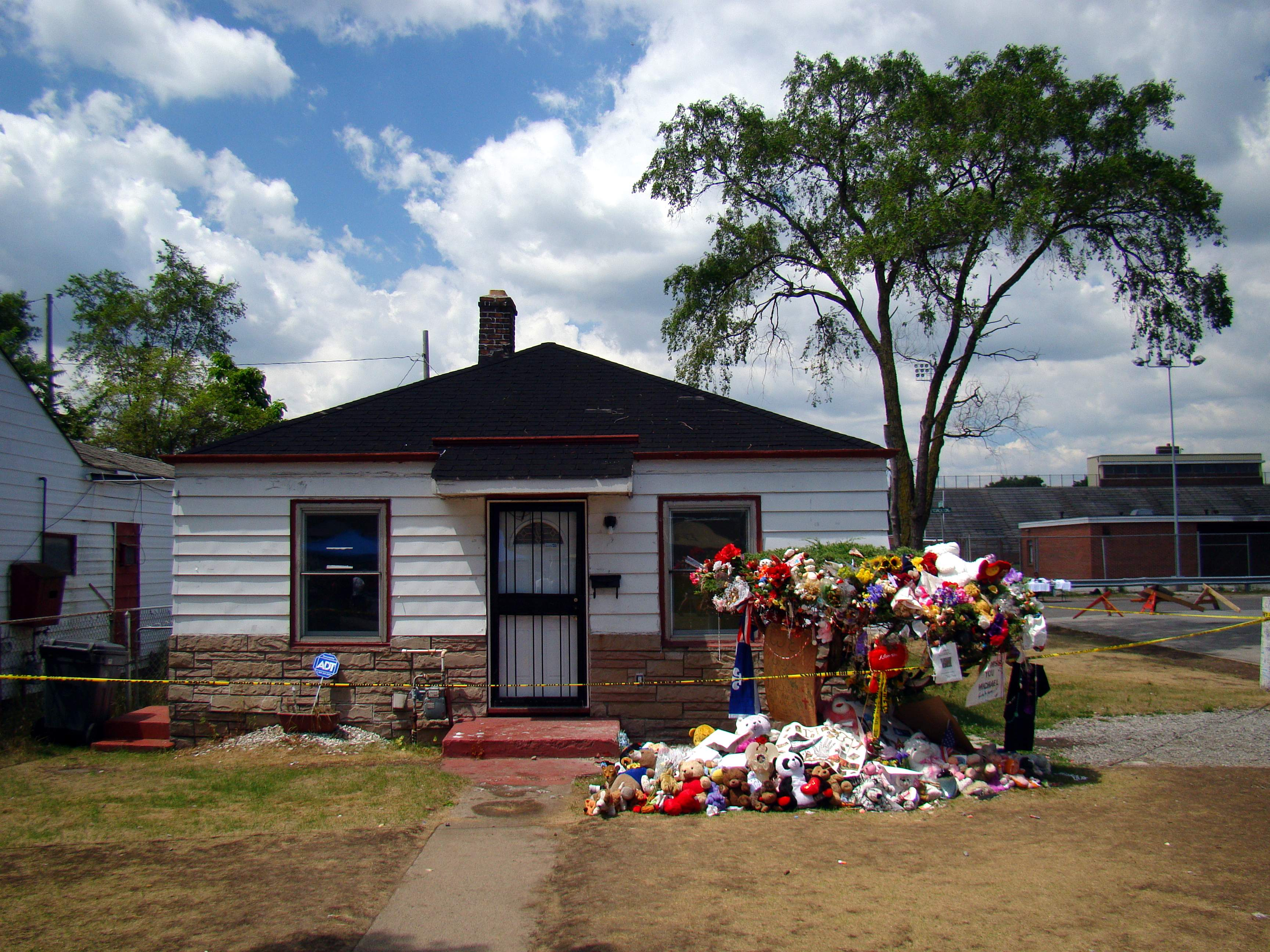
The house during the aftermath of Michael Jackson's death

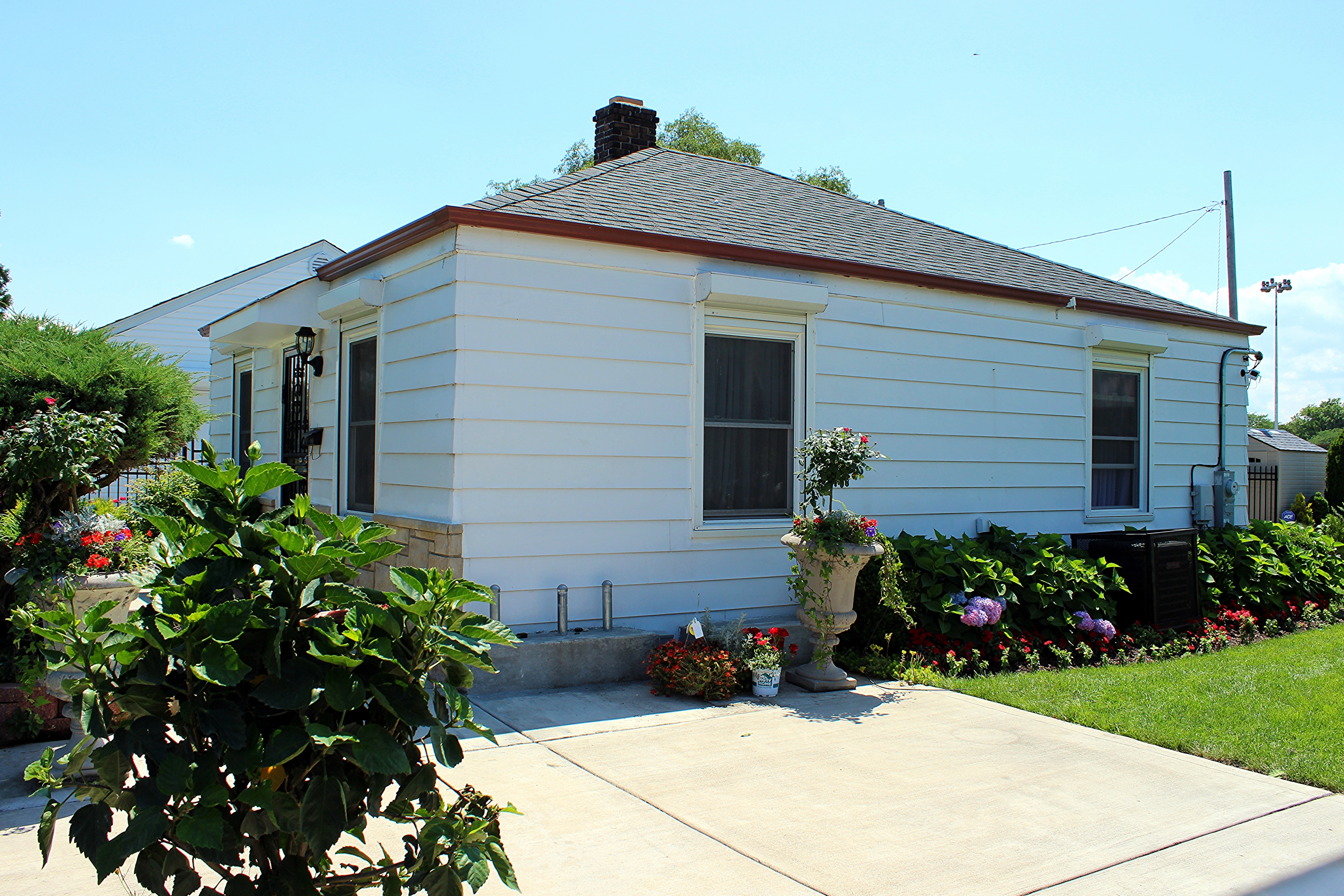
North side of the house

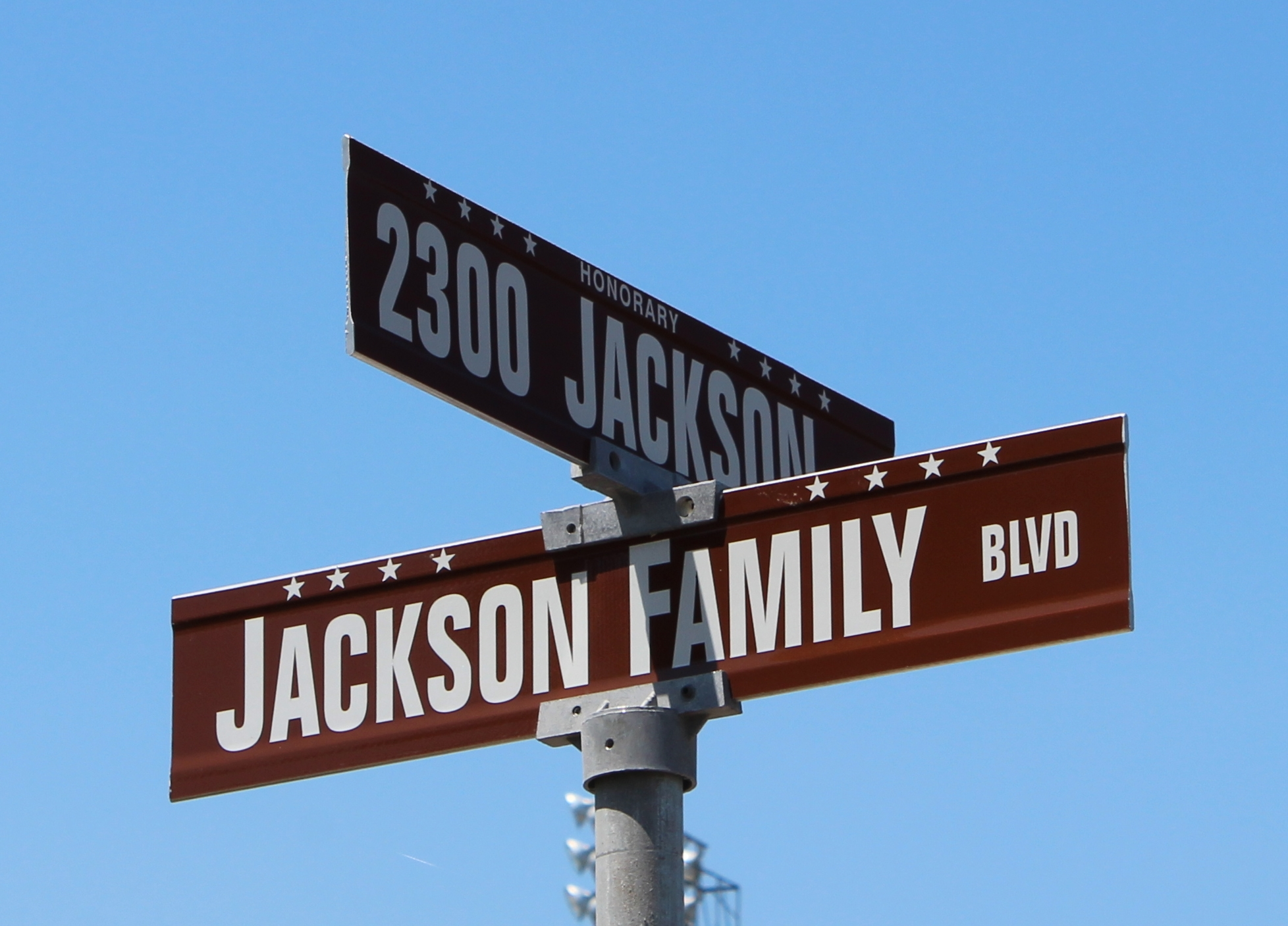
Jackson Family Boulevard sign at the intersection with Jackson Street

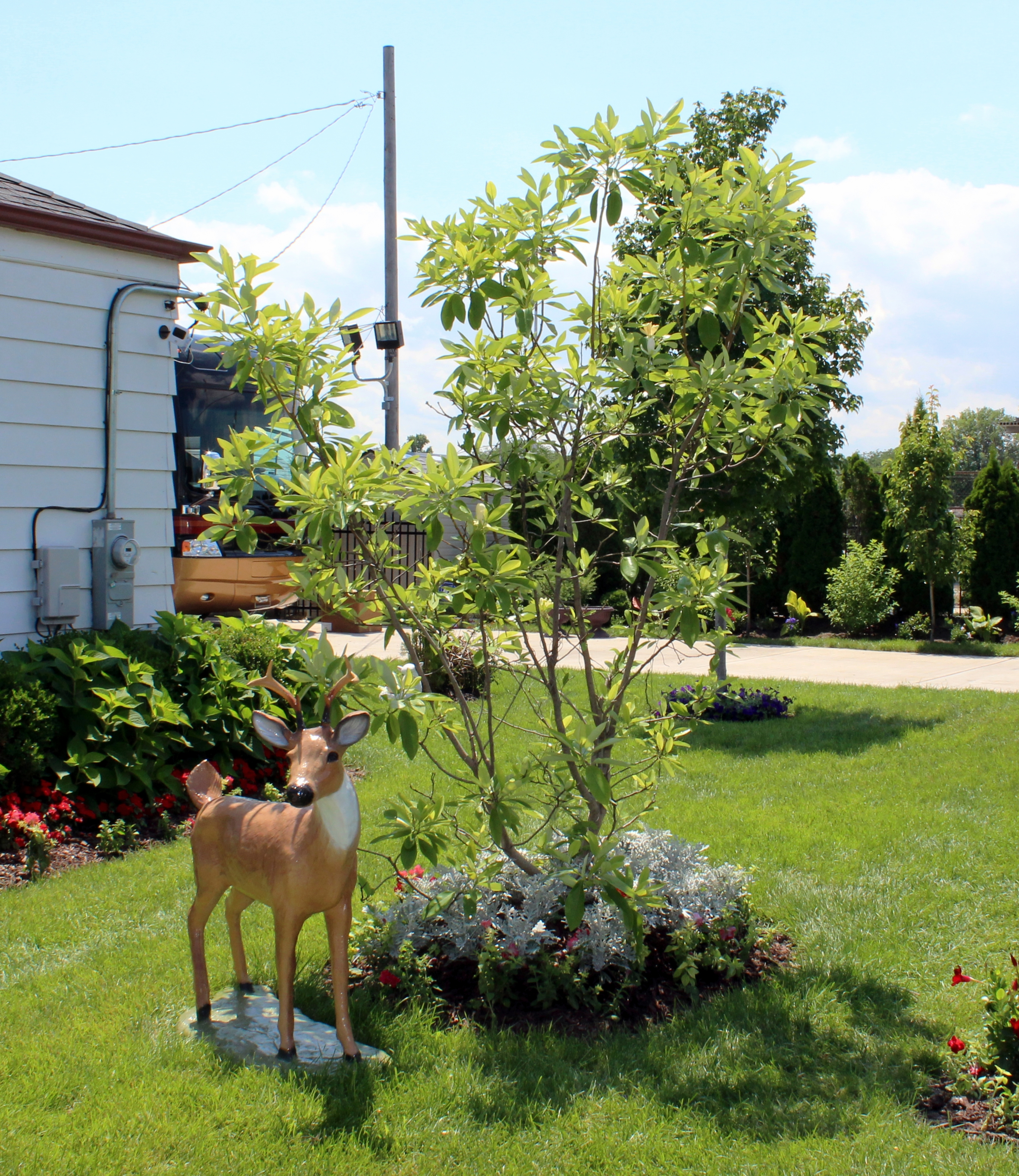
Garden ornaments

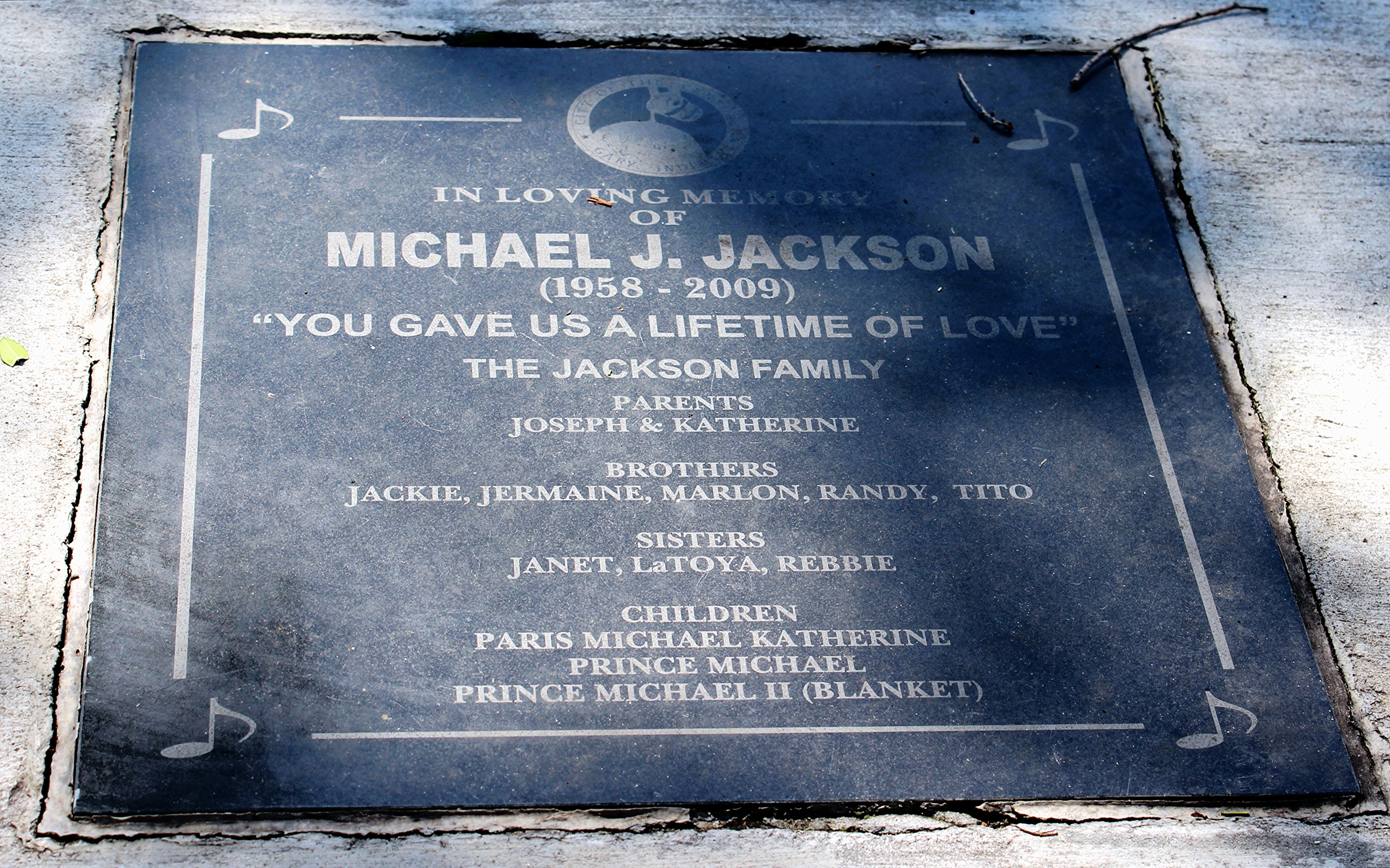
Memorial plaque to Michael Jackson

== See also ==
- List of monuments and memorials to Michael Jackson
- Hayvenhurst
- Neverland Ranch
- 2300 Jackson Street
