= Chase Sui Wonders =

American actress (born 1996)

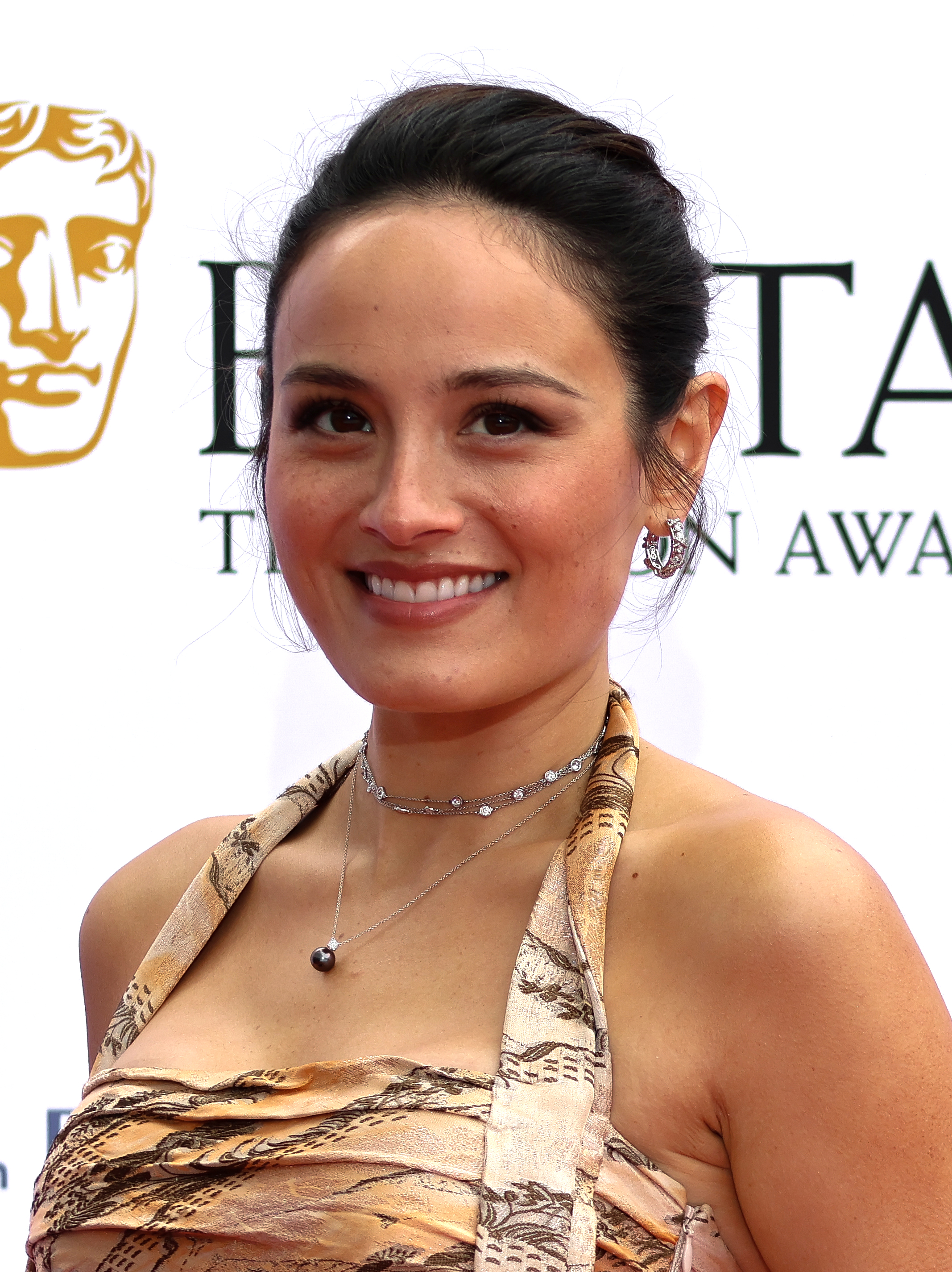
- Wonders at the 2026 British Academy Television Awards
- Born: May 21, 1996 (age 30); Bloomfield Hills, Michigan, U.S.
- Education: Harvard University (BA)
- Occupation: Actress
- Years active: 2009–present
- Relatives: Anna Sui (aunt)

Chase Sui Wonders (born May 21, 1996) is an American actress. On television, she is known for her roles in the HBO Max series Generation (2021) and the Apple TV+ series City on Fire (2023) and The Studio (2025). Her films include Bodies Bodies Bodies (2022) and I Know What You Did Last Summer (2025).

== Early life ==
Wonders was born in Bloomfield Hills, Michigan, to a father of Chinese descent and a mother of European descent. She is a niece of American fashion designer Anna Sui. She attended Cranbrook Schools outside Detroit and graduated from Harvard University magna cum laude, majoring in film studies and production, and writing for the college humor publication The Harvard Lampoon.

== Career ==
Wonders started her film career as the protagonist, co-director, and lead screenwriter in the 2009 film A Trivial Exclusion. She also directed and wrote a feature-length film Last Migration in 2015. In 2019, she starred as Makayla in the psychological horror film Daniel Isn't Real. Wonders starred in a small role in 2020 comedy-drama film On the Rocks, directed by Sofia Coppola. In 2021, Wonders joined the main cast of HBO Max's dramedy television series Generation as Riley, an independent and self-possessed mature high school student. In 2022, Wonders teamed up with Vogue China magazine to write and direct a short film titled Wake starring herself and Charles Melton.

In May 2021, Wonders joined the cast of the satirical slasher film Bodies Bodies Bodies, directed by Halina Reijn. The film premiered at the 2022 South by Southwest, on March 14, and began a wide release theater run on August 5, 2022. In October 2021, she was cast in Neil LaBute's Out of the Blue, alongside Diane Kruger and Hank Azaria. In January 2022, she was announced as the lead character of Apple TV+'s City on Fire, series based on the book of the same name. In 2025, she starred in Apple TV+ comedy The Studio in a main role, playing Quinn Hackett, a young creative executive at a fictional Hollywood film studio. For her performance, she received nominations for Best Supporting Actress at the 2nd Gotham TV Awards and 5th Astra TV Awards. On 31 July 2025, Kendrick Lamar and Dave Free's multidisciplinary creative communications company PGLang announced Project 3, their newest branch and creative agency. The announcement was released along with a short film titled The Agency, starring Wonders and Lionel Boyce, directed by Jack Begert, who co-wrote it alongside Free. In 2025, Wonders was cast as Shirley in the cancelled Buffy the Vampire Slayer reboot.

As a model, she appeared in a fashion collaboration campaign between her aunt, Anna Sui and Batsheva Hay in 2021.

== Filmography ==
=== Film ===
Year	Title	Role	Notes	Ref.
2009	A Trivial Exclusion	Chase Carter	Also as director and screenwriter	
2015	Last Migration	Sloane Stafford	Also as director and screenwriter	
2018	Salami on White	Chase	Short	
2019	Daniel Isn't Real	Makayla		
2019	Warpaint for the Teenage Soul	Wynne	Short	
2020	On the Rocks	Chase		
2021	Beau	Beau	Short	
2022	Wake	June	Short; Also as director and screenwriter	
2022	Bodies Bodies Bodies	Emma		
2022	Out of the Blue	Astrid		
2023	Past Lives	Girl	Voice	
2024	Junk	Tilly		
2025	I Know What You Did Last Summer	Ava Brucks		
2026	I Want Your Sex	Apple		
2027	Slayground †	TBA	Post-production	
2027	Naughty †	TBA	Filming	
TBA	Samo Lives †	TBA	Post-production	

=== Television ===
Year	Title	Role	Notes	Ref.
2020	Betty	Niki	2 episodes	
2021	Generation	Riley	Main role	
2023	City on Fire	Samantha Yeung	Main role	
2023	Bupkis	Nikki	Recurring role	
2025–present	The Studio	Quinn Hackett	Main role	
2025	Buffy the Vampire Slayer: New Sunnydale	Shirley	Unaired pilot	
2026	Star Wars: Visions Presents – The Ninth Jedi	Tafflah (voice)	English dub	

== Awards and nominations ==
Awards	Year	Category	Work	Result	Ref.
Astra TV Awards	2025	Best Supporting Actress in a Comedy Series	The Studio	Nominated	
Astra TV Awards	2025	Best Cast Ensemble in a Streaming Comedy Series	The Studio	Nominated	
Gotham TV Awards	2025	Outstanding Supporting Performance in a Comedy Series	The Studio	Nominated	
Newport Beach TV Fest	2025	Breakout Award	Herself	Honored	
Actor Awards	2026	Outstanding Performance by an Ensemble in a Comedy Series	The Studio	Won	
