= State of shock =

State of shock may refer to:

- shock (circulatory), a circulatory medical emergency
- shock (psychological), a psychological condition
- "State of Shock" (song), a 1984 song by The Jacksons featuring Michael Jackson and Mick Jagger
- State of Shock (D.I. album), 1994
- State of Shock (Ted Nugent album), 1979
- State of Shock (band), a band from Vancouver, Canada
