= Juliano Valdi =

American actor (born 2014)

- Born: Juliano Krue Valdi; February 2, 2014 (age 12)
- Occupation: Actor
- Years active: 2022–present
- Agent: Paradigm
- Notable work: Michael
- Mother: Shi Jackson

Juliano Krue Valdi (born February 2, 2014) is an American child actor. He gained recognition for portraying young Michael Jackson in his live-action film debut in the biographical film Michael. He is also the voice of Clyde McBride in the Nickelodeon series The Loud House.

== Filmography ==
=== Film ===
Year	Title	Role	Note	Ref.
2025	Arco	Arco Dorell (voice)	English dub	
2026	Michael	Young Michael Jackson	Debut film	

=== Television ===
Year	Title	Role
2022	The Hug Machine	Hendrix
2022	Bite Size Halloween	Major
2022	Face's Music Party	Juliano the Beatboxer
2025–present	The Loud House	Clyde McBride (season 9–present)
2026	Collider Set Stories	
2026	9-1-1	Reid
