= Max Milner =

English singer and actor

- Born: Max Milner
- Origin: London
- Genres: Rock
- Occupations: singer-songwriter, actor
- Instruments: vocals, guitar, piano
- Website: www.maxmilner.com

Max Milner is a singer and actor from London, England. He had a #63 hit on the UK Singles Chart with a cover version of Free Fallin' by Tom Petty.

At age twenty-one, Milner auditioned for The Voice UK, appearing on the first of 4 audition shows. He auditioned with a mash-up between The Beatles' "Come Together" and "Lose Yourself" by Eminem. The audition was met with a positive reception, with three coaches: Danny O'Donoghue, Jessie J and will.i.am all electing for Milner to join their teams—from which Milner selected O'Donoghue. During the battle rounds, Milner sung "Beggin'" by Madcon against twenty-three-year-old Bill Downs—with Danny crowning him the winner. In the second live show, Milner performed "Free Fallin'", originally by Tom Petty—finding himself in the bottom two alongside Hannah Berney; from which he was saved. In the fourth live show, Milner performed KT Tunstall's "Black Horse and the Cherry Tree", also incorporating elements of Ed Sheeran's "You Need Me, I Don't Need You"—finding himself in the bottom three alongside Aleks Josh and David Julien; from which O'Donoghue saved him for a second time. During the semi-finals, Milner performed The Police's "Every Breath You Take"—though he was eliminated in favour of Bo Bruce.

In 2019, he appeared as Razzle, the drummer for Hanoi Rocks in the Mötley Crüe biopic The Dirt.

His mother is Sally Anne Triplett, who represented the UK at the Eurovision Song Contest twice, in 1980 and 1982, as part of the groups Prima Donna and Bardo.
