= Garth Risk Hallberg =

American writer

- Born: November 1978 (age 47); Baton Rouge, Louisiana, U.S.
- Education: Washington University in St. Louis (BA)
- Occupations: Author, writer
- Spouse: Elise White
- Children: 2
- Writing career
- Notable work: City on Fire (2015)

Garth Risk Hallberg (born November 1978) is an American author. His debut novel, City on Fire, was published by Knopf in 2015.

== Early life and education ==
Hallberg was born outside Baton Rouge, Louisiana and grew up in Greenville, North Carolina. Both of Hallberg's parents were teachers; his father was also a writer. They divorced when Hallberg was 13.

In 2001, he received a degree in English from Washington University in St. Louis, where he met his future wife, Elise White.

== Writing career ==
His debut novella, A Field Guide to the North American Family, was published in 2007. He published his first novel, City on Fire, in 2015. A second novel, The Second Coming, was published in 2024. His work has also been published in The Millions.

Hallberg credits David Foster Wallace's novel Infinite Jest with allowing him to face issues that had led him to substance abuse as a young man.

== Personal life ==
Hallberg resides in New York City.

== Bibliography ==
Novella

- A Field Guide to the North American Family (2007)

Novels

- City on Fire (2015)
- The Second Coming (2024)
