= Natasha Rothwell =

American actress and writer (born 1980)

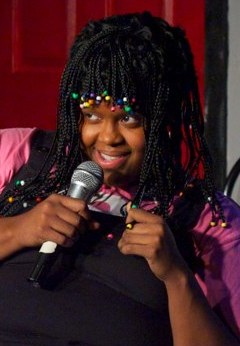
- Rothwell in 2012
- Born: October 18, 1980 (age 45); Wichita, Kansas, U.S.
- Education: Ithaca College (attended); University of Maryland, College Park (BA)
- Occupations: Actress; writer; producer
- Years active: 2011–present
- Notable work: Insecure; The White Lotus; How to Die Alone

Natasha Rothwell (born October 18, 1980) is an American actress, writer, and producer. She is best known for her roles as Kelli Prenny on the HBO series Insecure (2016–2021) and as Belinda Lindsey on The White Lotus (2021, 2025), earning two Primetime Emmy Award nominations for the latter. Rothwell also co-created and starred in the Hulu comedy series How to Die Alone (2024).

== Early life ==
Rothwell was born on October 18, 1980 in Wichita, Kansas. Her parents, David and Sharon Rothwell, are natives of Philadelphia. She has three siblings. They were raised Christian.

Due to her father’s career in the United States Air Force, Rothwell's family moved frequently when she was young, including to New Mexico, Florida, Illinois, New Jersey, Maryland, and Turkey. Rothwell attended two elementary schools, two middle schools, and two high schools. She graduated from Westlake High School in Waldorf, Maryland.

Rothwell attended Ithaca College as a journalism major before transferring to the University of Maryland as a theater major on a full creative and performing arts scholarship. She credits Langston Hughes's poem "Harlem"—which begins with the question "What happens to a dream deferred?"—with inspiring her to change majors and pursue acting.

== Career ==
Upon graduating, Rothwell moved to Japan to teach English and performed at the Tokyo Comedy Store. In 2009, she returned to the U.S. and moved to New York City, where she worked as a high school theatre teacher for four years while pursuing comedy. She performed with the Upright Citizens Brigade and was hired as a writer on Saturday Night Live for the 2014-2015 season. After eight years in New York, Rothwell moved to Los Angeles in 2015.

In 2016, Rothwell had her breakthrough role on the Issa Rae HBO series Insecure as Kelli Prenny. She also served as a writer and supervising producer. The series ran for five seasons, concluding in 2021. Rothwell won Outstanding Supporting Actress in a Comedy Series for her role at the 2022 NAACP Image Awards.

Rothwell landed roles in television series Netflix Presents: The Characters, Search Party, A Black Lady Sketch Show, Love, Victor, and Brooklyn Nine-Nine.

On April 15, 2019, Rothwell joined a host of other writers in firing their agents as part of the Writers Guild of America’s stand against the Association of Talent Agents and the practice of packaging.

In 2020, Rothwell starred in the films Wonder Woman 1984, Like a Boss, and Sonic the Hedgehog. In 2021, her company Big Hattie Productions struck an overall deal with ABC Signature.

In 2021, Rothwell joined the cast of season 1 of the HBO series The White Lotus, as Belinda. She was nominated for a Primetime Emmy Award for Outstanding Supporting Actress in a Limited or Anthology Series or Movie.

In 2023, Rothwell starred in the films Wonka and Wish.

In 2024, Rothwell co-created, produced, and starred in the comedy series How to Die Alone on Hulu. She plays a 35-year-old JFK airport worker who has never been in love, partially inspired by Rothwell’s own journey of love and self-discovery. The series was critically acclaimed and Rothwell won a Celebration of Cinema and Television Award and an NAACP Image Award nomination.

As of September 2024, Rothwell is developing a TV adaptation of the viral TikTok series Who TF Did I Marry by Tareasa "Reesa Teesa" Johnson.

In 2025, Rothwell reprised her role as Belinda in season 3 of The White Lotus.

== Personal life ==
Rothwell lives in Los Angeles with her two goldendoodle dogs. Her favorite place to visit is Big Sur.

Rothwell has ADHD, describing herself as "neurospicy", and has spoken about the importance of mental health. She describes herself as a Type-A person and a nerd.

Rothwell is a Democrat and an advocate for women's rights, LGBTQIA+ rights, and civil rights. She is a vocal critic of Donald Trump’s administrations and has marched against anti-immigration policies and police brutality. She has spoken about her passion for activism, telling GQ in 2018, "I lived in DC for almost 10 years. When you live there you kind of can't help but be politically active."

== Filmography ==
=== Film ===
Year	Title	Role	Notes
2015	A Year and Change	Angie	
2018	Love, Simon	Ms. Albright	
2019	Wyrm	V.P. Lister	
2020	Like a Boss	Jill	
2020	Sonic the Hedgehog	Rachel	
2020	Wonder Woman 1984	Carol	
2022	Sonic the Hedgehog 2	Rachel	
2022	Aqua Teen Forever: Plantasm	Japongaloid (Japongaloid Natasha) (voice)	
2023	Wish	Sakina (voice)	
2023	Wonka	Piper Benz	
2024	Sonic the Hedgehog 3	Rachel	Cameo

=== Television ===
Year	Title	Actor	Writer	Producer	Role	Notes
2014	Wild 'n Out	Yes	No	No	Herself	Cast member, 2013–2014
2014	Royal Pains	Yes	No	No	Tamara	Episode: "Smoke and Mirrors"
2014–2015	Saturday Night Live	No	Yes	No	—N/a	Writer, 21 episodes
2016	Search Party	Yes	No	No	Real Woman	Episode: "The Mysterious Disappearance of the Girl No One Knew"
2016	Netflix Presents: The Characters	Yes	Yes	Executive	Various	Episode: "Natasha Rothwell"
2016–2021	Insecure	Yes	Yes	Yes	Kelli Prenny	Main role, 32 episodes; writer, 17 episodes; also co-producer, supervising producer, and consulting producer
2017	BoJack Horseman	Yes	No	No	Clemelia Bloodsworth (voice)	Episode: "Time's Arrow"
2017	Future-Worm!	Yes	No	No	Various (voice)	2 episodes
2018	Brooklyn Nine-Nine	Yes	No	No	Della Alvarado	Episode: "Show Me Going"
2018–2021	DuckTales	Yes	No	No	Zan Owlson (voice)	5 episodes
2019	Star vs. the Forces of Evil	Yes	No	No	Brunzetta (voice)	2 episodes
2019	A Black Lady Sketch Show	Yes	No	No	Various	2 episodes
2020	Love, Victor	Yes	No	No	Ms. Albright	Episode: "Welcome to Creekwood"
2020–2025	Baby Shark's Big Show!	Yes	No	No	Mommy Shark (voice)	Main role, English dub
2021	American Dad!	Yes	No	No	Carol (voice)	Episode: "Cry Baby"
2021, 2025	The White Lotus	Yes	No	No	Belinda Lindsey	Main role, 14 episodes (seasons 1 and 3)
2021–2022	Tuca & Bertie	Yes	No	No	Terry Toucan	3 episodes
2022	American Dad!	Yes	No	No	Superior Court Judge (voice)	Episode: "Haley Was a Girl Scout?"
2022	The Ghost and Molly McGee	Yes	No	No	Candace Green (voice)	2 episodes
2022	Bubble Guppies	Yes	No	No	Mommy Shark (voice)	Episode: "The Jaw-some Sharkventure!"
2024	Sausage Party: Foodtopia	Yes	No	No	Rutabaga Ginsberg; various (voice)	5 episodes
2024	How to Die Alone	Yes	Yes	Executive	Mel	Main role, 8 episodes; also creator

== Awards and nominations ==
Year	Award	Category	Work	Result	Ref.
2016	Writers Guild of America	Best Comedy/Variety – Sketch Series (Note: Shared with the writers of Saturday Night Live.)	Saturday Night Live	Nominated	
2019	Black Reel Awards	Outstanding Supporting Actress, Comedy Series	Insecure	Nominated	
2019	Black Reel Awards	Outstanding Writing, Comedy Series (Note: Shared with Issa Rae.)	Insecure	Nominated	
2019	NAACP Image Awards	Outstanding Supporting Actress in a Comedy Series	Insecure	Nominated	
2020	Black Reel Awards	Outstanding Comedy Series (Note: Shared with the producers of Insecure.)	Insecure	Won	
2020	Black Reel Awards	Outstanding Supporting Actress, Comedy Series	Insecure	Nominated	
2020	Black Reel Awards	Outstanding Writing, Comedy Series	Insecure	Nominated	
2020	Primetime Emmy Awards	Outstanding Comedy Series	Insecure	Nominated	
2021	NAACP Image Awards	Outstanding Supporting Actress in a Comedy Series	Insecure	Nominated	
2021	Celebration Black of Cinema and Television	Special Honoree Award	Herself	Won	
2022	NAACP Image Awards	Outstanding Supporting Actress in a Comedy Series	Insecure	Nominated	
2022	NAACP Image Awards	Outstanding Supporting Actress in a Television Movie, Limited-Series or Dramatic Special	The White Lotus	Nominated	
2022	Black Reel Awards	Outstanding Supporting Actress, Comedy Series	Insecure	Nominated	
2022	Black Reel Awards	Outstanding Supporting Actress, TV Movie/Limited Series	The White Lotus	Nominated	
2022	Primetime Emmy Awards	Outstanding Supporting Actress in a Limited or Anthology Series or Movie	The White Lotus	Nominated	
2024	Celebration of Cinema and Television	Producer Award	How to Die Alone	Won	
2025	NAACP Image Awards	Outstanding Actress in a Comedy Series	How to Die Alone	Nominated	
2025	NAACP Image Awards	Outstanding Comedy Series	How to Die Alone	Nominated	
2025	Independent Spirit Awards	Best Ensemble Cast in a New Scripted Series	How to Die Alone	Won	
2025	Primetime Emmy Awards	Outstanding Supporting Actress in a Drama Series	The White Lotus	Nominated	
