= Joe Jackson (talent manager) =

American talent manager and patriarch of the Jackson family (1928–2018)

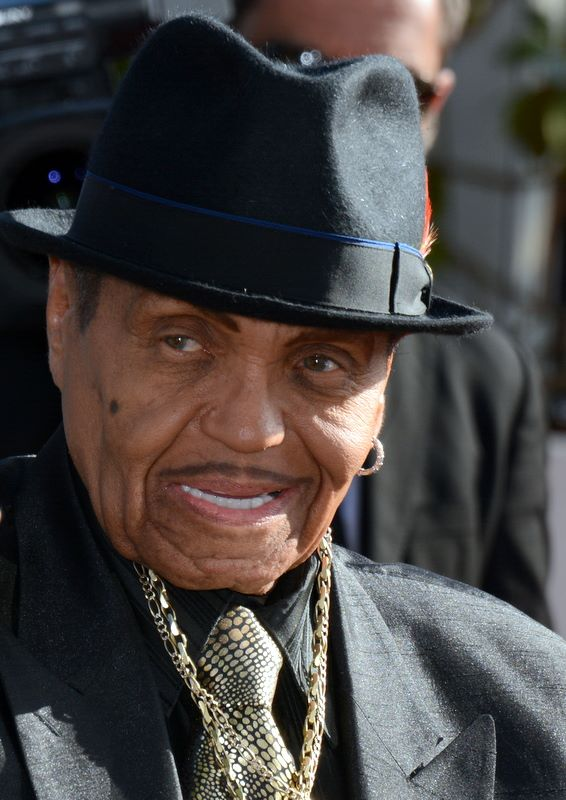
- Jackson in 2014
- Born: Joseph Walter Jackson; July 26, 1928; Fountain Hill, Arkansas, U.S.
- Died: June 27, 2018 (aged 89); Las Vegas, Nevada, U.S.
- Burial place: Forest Lawn Memorial Park, Glendale, California, U.S.
- Occupation: Talent manager
- Years active: 1964–2018
- Spouses: Isophine Bernice Atkinson (m. 1947, divorced) Katherine Scruse (m. 1949)
- Children: 11, including Rebbie, Jackie, Tito, Jermaine, La Toya, Marlon, Michael, Randy, and Janet
- Relatives: Jackson family

Joseph Walter "Joe" Jackson (July 26, 1928 – June 27, 2018) was an American talent manager and patriarch of the Jackson family of entertainers. He was inducted into the Rhythm and Blues Music Hall of Fame in 2014.

== Early life ==
Joseph Walter Jackson was born on July 26, 1928, (Note: The most commonly reported year of birth for Joe is 1928. However, Katherine Jackson's memoir My Family, The Jacksons lists his birth year as 1929.) in Fountain Hill, Arkansas, the eldest of five children of Crystal Lee (née King; 1907–1992) and Samuel Joseph Jackson (1893–1993). His father was a teacher. Joe's great-grandfather, July "Jack" Gale, was a U.S. Army scout. A biography of Joe also alleged that his great-grandfather was an Indigenous American and a medicine man, although no tribal affiliation was specified.

Joe recalled that his father was domineering and strict, and described himself in his memoir The Jacksons as a lonely child with few friends. After his parents separated when he was 12, his mother, two brothers, and sister moved to East Chicago, Indiana, while he moved with his father to Oakland, California. When he was 18, his father remarried, and Joe moved to East Chicago to live with his mother and siblings. He took a job at Inland Steel Company and did not finish high school. While living in East Chicago, he began pursuing a boxing career and found success in the Golden Gloves program.

In the early 1950s, Joe briefly performed with his younger brother Luther in their blues band the Falcons, playing guitar. Despite their efforts, the Falcons did not secure a recording contract and disbanded after one of their members, Thornton "Pookie" Hudson, founded his own group in 1952. That group became the successful doo-wop ensemble the Spaniels.

== Personal life ==
=== Marriage ===
While preparing to become a professional boxer, Joe met 17-year-old Katherine Scruse, who also lived in East Chicago and attended Washington High School. He had already been married and divorced before he began dating Katherine. The couple married on November 5, 1949. In January 1950, they purchased a small two-bedroom home at 2300 Jackson Street near East Chicago in Gary, Indiana. They had 10 children together.

- Maureen Reillette "Rebbie" Jackson (born May 29, 1950)
- Sigmund Esco "Jackie" Jackson (born May 4, 1951)
- Toriano Adaryll "Tito" Jackson (October 15, 1953 – September 15, 2024)
- Jermaine LaJuane Jackson (born December 11, 1954)
- La Toya Yvonne Jackson (born May 29, 1956)
- Marlon David Jackson (born March 12, 1957)
- Brandon David Jackson (March 12, 1957 – March 13, 1957)
- Michael Joseph Jackson (August 29, 1958 – June 25, 2009)
- Steven Randall "Randy" Jackson (born October 29, 1961)
- Janet Damita Jo Jackson (born May 16, 1966)

Joe had extramarital affairs. Katherine filed for divorce on March 9, 1973, with a Los Angeles County clerk, but later decided to drop the divorce proceedings. The following year, Joe fathered a daughter, Joh'Vonnie (born August 30, 1974), with Cheryle Terrell. Katherine attempted once again to divorce her husband in 1982, but was persuaded to abandon the action. Joe moved to Las Vegas. Despite living separately, Joe and Katherine remained legally married until his death in 2018. Katherine denied rumors that she and Joe were estranged.

== Career ==
=== The Jackson 5 ===
In the early 1960s, Joe began pushing his sons in a musical direction after they began playing around with his musical instruments while he was at work. He then first started working with his three eldest sons Jackie, Tito, and Jermaine. Younger sons Marlon and Michael were eventually put into the band; youngest brother Randy was too young to join at the time. Joe began enforcing long and intense rehearsals for his sons. At first, the group went under the name The Jackson Brothers. Following the inclusion of Marlon and Michael in the group, their name was changed to The Jackson 5. After a couple of years performing in local talent contests and high school functions, The Jackson 5 got a color TV set after the judges awarded them second place. Joe booked them in more professional venues, including in Chicago, and they eventually landed a gig at the Apollo Theater in New York City. On November 21, 1967, The Jackson 5 were signed by Joe to their first record contract with Gordon Keith, owner and first president of Steeltown Records in Gary, Indiana. The group's first single "Big Boy," with Michael as the lead singer, was released by Steeltown on January 31, 1968. "Big Boy" did not become a hit but because the brothers actually had a single released, they became local celebrities in Gary after it received some airplay on local Gary radio stations. Within the year, Joe helped to land his sons an audition for Motown Records. The Jackson 5 received a record contract with Motown in March 1969.

Shortly after, Joe moved his family to the Los Angeles area and sat in on every recording session the group made for Motown. The group received nationwide attention after their first single for Motown, "I Want You Back", hit No. 1 following its release on October 7, 1969, and included on their first album, Diana Ross Presents The Jackson 5, in December 1969. The group saw the release of their first three albums and their first four singles, "I Want You Back" (1969), "ABC" (1970), "The Love You Save" (1970), and "I'll Be There" (1970), reach No. 1 in the US within 10 months. In 1974, wanting to reassert his control, Joe had his family, including daughters Rebbie, La Toya, and Janet, perform at casinos and resorts in the Las Vegas area, inspired by the success of fellow family act The Osmonds.

Joe had also formed his own record label 'Ivory Tower International Records' and signed artists under his management in which they toured internationally with The Jackson 5 as opening acts in 1974. In 1975, the group left Motown Records and signed a contract with Epic Records, with the exception of Jermaine, who remained at Motown as a solo artist. Jermaine was replaced in the group by brother Randy. Michael also had a separate deal with Epic to release solo albums. Unbeknownst to Joe or the group, Motown president Berry Gordy had trademarked the group's name The Jackson 5. This came to light as the group was signing its new contract with Epic Records and Gordy refused to allow them to use the name The Jackson 5 with their new label. The group renamed themselves The Jacksons. In 1978, Joe's youngest son Randy released his solo single "How Can I Be Sure" on his record label. In 1982, Joe established Janet's career as an actress and as a recording artist while managing her. He financed the recording of Janet's first demo and arranged a recording contract for her with A&M Records.

== Public image and controversy ==
In the late 1980s, Joe's image as a father became tarnished as the media reported stories told by his children that he was abusive toward them. All of his children called him "Joseph", which sometimes made them feel estranged from him. Michael claimed that from a young age, he was physically and emotionally abused by his father, enduring incessant rehearsals, whippings and name-calling, but also said that his father's strict discipline played a large part in his success. Michael first spoke openly about his childhood abuse in a 1993 interview with Oprah Winfrey. He said that during his childhood, he often cried from loneliness. Michael recalled that his father sat in a chair with a belt in his hand as Michael and his siblings rehearsed and that "if you didn't do it the right way, he would tear you up, really get you." Joe admitted to whipping his children with switches and belts as punishment, but said he did not do so at random, and claimed never to have used any hard object as he felt was implied by the word "beating."

Both Joe and Katherine denied the characterization of abuse. Katherine said that the whippings and physical punishments were common back then when Michael and his siblings grew up. Other siblings, Jackie, Tito, Jermaine and Marlon, have denied that their father was abusive. La Toya however claims her father sexually abused her and her sister as a child while the mother enabled it. Rebbie called the police on her father over the sexual abuse, and the mother told the police nothing happened. Despite the allegations, Michael honored his father with an annual "Joseph Jackson Day" at Neverland Ranch and ultimately forgave him, noting that Joe's difficult upbringing in the Great Depression and the Jim Crow South, along with his working-class adulthood, hardened him emotionally and made him push his children to succeed as entertainers.

== Later life and death ==
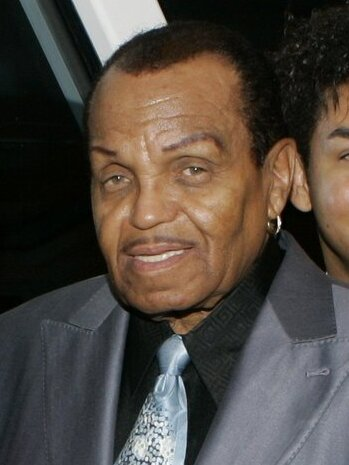
Jackson at an event in 2007

In 2011, Joe was inducted into the Arkansas Black Hall of Fame. In 2014, when his son Michael was posthumously inducted into the Rhythm and Blues Music Hall of Fame with a Lifetime Achievement Award, Joe accepted the award on his behalf. The following year, he received the organization's Humanitarian Award. In June 2015, he appeared at the BET Awards 2015 with his daughter Janet as she accepted the Ultimate Icon Award.

On July 27, 2015, Joe was hospitalized after suffering a stroke and heart arrhythmia while celebrating his 87th birthday in Brazil. He was not stable enough to leave the country for further treatment until two weeks later. After arriving in Los Angeles on August 11, plans were made for Joe to visit Cedars-Sinai Medical Center regarding blurred vision following the stroke. In January 2017, his brother Lawrence died.

On June 22, 2018, TMZ reported that Joe had been hospitalized in Las Vegas in the final stages of terminal pancreatic cancer. He died at a hospice in Las Vegas at 3:30 a.m. (PDT) on June 27. On July 2, he was interred at Forest Lawn Memorial Park in Glendale, near Los Angeles, the same cemetery where his son Michael had been buried in 2009.

== Portrayals ==
Joe has been portrayed by:

- Lawrence Hilton-Jacobs (1992) in The Jacksons: An American Dream (mini-series)
- Tom Kenny (2000) in Murry Wilson: Rock N' Roll Dad (web cartoon)
- Frederic Tucker (2004) in Man in the Mirror: The Michael Jackson Story (VH1 biopic)
- Affion Crockett (2012) in Black Dynamite (TV series)
- Richard Lawson (2017) in Michael Jackson: Searching for Neverland (television film)
- Colman Domingo (2026) in Michael (film biopic)
