= City on Fire (Hallberg novel) =

Book by Garth Risk Hallberg

- First edition (US)
- Author: Garth Risk Hallberg
- Language: English
- Genre: Fiction
- Publisher: Alfred A. Knopf (US); Jonathan Cape (UK)
- Publication date: 2015
- Publication place: United States
- Media type: Print (hardback & paperback)
- Pages: 927
- ISBN: 978-0-385-35377-9

City on Fire is a 2015 novel by Garth Risk Hallberg, published by Alfred A. Knopf. The novel takes place in New York City in the 1970s. It is Hallberg's first published novel. Hallberg received an advance of $2 million for the novel, which was rumored at the time to be the highest ever for a debut novel. However, other debut novels acquired around the same time also received seven-figure advances.

== Summary ==
City on Fire follows the investigation of a Central Park shooting that took place on New Year's Eve during the 1970s.

This book was a New York Times Notable Book and named one of the Best Books of the Year by The Washington Post, Los Angeles Times, NPR, Vogue, San Francisco Chronicle, and The Wall Street Journal.

== Television series ==
A television adaptation of the novel was scheduled to air on Apple TV+.

== Reception ==
City on Fire received a mixed reception from critics. The novel received praise from Megan O'Grady in Vogue, who called it "the kind of exuberant, Zeitgeisty New York novel, like The Bonfire of the Vanities or The Goldfinch, that you'll either love, hate, or pretend to have read". Michiko Kakutani of The New York Times described it as "an amazing virtual reality machine", and credited Hallberg with an "instinctive gift for spinning suspense not just out of dovetailing plotlines and odd Dickensian coincidences but also from secrets buried in his characters' pasts". Stephen King tweeted about the novel, calling it "massively entertaining", and "as close to a great American novel as this century has produced". Louis Menand wrote in his long review in The New Yorker, "What Hallberg is after is an atmosphere, and he gets it."

On the other hand, Elisabeth Vincentelli of the New York Post called it "overhyped" and "a steaming pile of literary dung". At The Guardian, Sandra Newman echoed the sentiment of overhype, calling it "a debut of remarkable promise, rather than as the masterpiece that fulfills that promise".

City on Fire debuted at #5 on The New York Times Bestseller list in the hardcover fiction category on November 1, 2015.
