= Denials (The White Lotus) =

- The White Lotus episode
- Episode no.: Season 3 Episode 6
- Directed by: Mike White
- Written by: Mike White
- Cinematography by: Ben Kutchins
- Editing by: Scott Turner; Kyle Traynor
- Original air date: March 23, 2025
- Running time: 63 minutes

Guest appearances
- Scott Glenn as Jim Hollinger; Nicholas Duvernay as Zion Lindsey; Arnas Fedaravicius as Valentin; Christian Friedel as Fabian; Dom Hetrakul as Pornchai; Charlotte Le Bon as Chloe

Episode chronology
← Previous "Full-Moon Party"	Next → "Killer Instincts"
- The White Lotus season 3

"Denials" is the sixth episode of the third season of the American black comedy drama anthology television series The White Lotus. It is the nineteenth overall episode of the series and was written and directed by series creator Mike White. It originally aired on HBO on March 23, 2025, and also was available on Max on the same date.

The series follows the guests and employees of the fictional White Lotus resort chain. The season is set in Thailand, and follows the new guests, which include Rick Hatchett and his younger girlfriend Chelsea; Timothy Ratliff, his wife Victoria, and their children Saxon, Piper, and Lochlan; Jaclyn Lemon and her friends Kate and Laurie; White Lotus Hawaii employee Belinda; and White Lotus Thailand staff Pornchai, Mook, and Gaitok. In the episode, Saxon and Lochlan begin to uncover what truly happened at the Full Moon Party, while Chloe argues with "Gary" over the party. Meanwhile, Piper takes her parents to the monastery, and Belinda welcomes her son Zion into the resort.

According to Nielsen Media Research, the episode was seen by an estimated 0.744 million household viewers and gained a 0.19 ratings share among adults aged 18–49. The episode received mostly positive reviews, which praised the performances, character development and production values.

== Plot ==
Timothy (Jason Isaacs) imagines his wife Victoria (Parker Posey) waking to the sound of a gunshot and discovering that he has killed himself; she and their daughter Piper (Sarah Catherine Hook) are horrified to find his body. Disturbed, Timothy hides the gun in a drawer.

Having spent the night with Pornchai (Dom Hetrakul), Belinda (Natasha Rothwell) wakes to find her son Zion (Nicholas Duvernay) has arrived early. He discovers his mother in bed with Pornchai, but after the initial awkwardness he tells her he is happy for her. Later, Pornchai suggests he and Belinda discuss opening the wellness center she once planned to create with Tanya.

On the yacht, Chloe (Charlotte Le Bon) tells Chelsea she is worried about "Gary" (Jon Gries) discovering that she had sex with both Saxon and Lochlan. Saxon (Patrick Schwarzenegger) wakes with vague memories of masturbating while his younger brother Lochlan (Sam Nivola) had sex with Chloe next to him. Horrified, he begins to remember that Lochlan was actually masturbating Saxon while having sex with Chloe. Saxon tells Lochlan that they both blacked out before vomiting in the bathroom.

Back at the resort, Victoria tells Saxon and Lochlan of Piper's plans to spend a year in Thailand at the nearby meditation center. Saxon is dismissive and Lochlan is supportive, agreeing to come along to the center to support Piper while Timothy and Victoria meet the monk she plans to study under.

Kate (Leslie Bibb) tells Laurie (Carrie Coon) that she saw Valentin (Arnas Fedaravicius) sneaking out of Jaclyn's room, implying they had sex. Laurie is clearly hurt but says she just feels pity for Jaclyn (Michelle Monaghan) for being so obsessed with male attention at her age. Later, Laurie asks Jaclyn about it, and Jaclyn denies sleeping with Valentin. Laurie continues to press the issue until Jaclyn becomes angry and accuses her and Kate of talking about her behind her back.

In Bangkok, Rick (Walton Goggins) meets with Sritala (Patravadi Mejudhon) under his false pretense of arranging a film project, for which he gets his friend Frank (Sam Rockwell) to pose as the director. He claims that in order to get a genuine role for her, the "director" wants to meet with her at her home, despite Sritala's reservations since her husband is still unwell.

Piper goes to the monastery to meet with monk Luang Por Teera, telling him about her aimlessness and problems with her family. Afterward, Timothy speaks with him and discusses the afterlife, which he finds comforting. He chooses to support Piper's decision to stay. Victoria is shocked and tells Piper she will support her if she agrees to stay for one night. Piper agrees and Lochlan chooses to stay as well. While the Ratliffs are gone, Gaitok (Tayme Thapthimthong) sneaks into their villa and retrieves the gun Timothy had stolen from the security booth.

Chloe returns home and attempts to reconcile with Gary, who tells her he is not bothered by her infidelity and tells her he needs her help "taking care of something". He has her invite the brothers to dinner. Later, he approaches Belinda, who is clearly alarmed, and asks her to come to dinner as well, adding, "I think we should talk."

By the pool, Saxon asks Chelsea why she did not have sex with him. She explains that she has a boyfriend and believes him to be her soulmate, while also referring to Saxon as "soulless". Chloe arrives and invites Saxon and his brother, Lochlan, to have dinner at Gary's house, convincing him he is not upset. Chloe confirms that Saxon and Lochlan had a sexual encounter, deeply disturbing Saxon. At the monastery, Lochlan recalls his incestuous encounter with his brother. In Bangkok, Rick and Frank take a boat ride to the Hollinger household, where Frank poses as the director and introduces himself to Sritala and her husband, Jim (Scott Glenn).

== Production ==
=== Development ===
The episode was written and directed by series creator Mike White. This was White's nineteenth writing and directorial credit for the series.

=== Writing ===
Patrick Schwarzenegger expressed surprise by the episode's revelation that Saxon and Lochlan participated in a threesome, describing it as "wild", and believing that there must have been a typo on the script. Sam Nivola also expressed surprise, but affirmed that "I never for a second doubted the importance of that scene to the story." Schwarzenegger considered that the storyline does not rely on shock value, "Mike [White] does a great job with my character with that scene, but also in past seasons of always bringing something that is really fun and outrageous and sparks a conversation that gets people talking, but also has to do a lot with the pilgrimage of the characters' story and where he's going. And here, especially with the relationship Saxon has with his little brother. There's always more than what just meets the eye of the shock value on the screen."

== Reception ==
=== Viewers ===
In its original American broadcast, "Denials" was seen by an estimated 0.744 million household viewers with a 0.19 in the 18-49 demographics. This means that 0.19 percent of all households with televisions watched the episode. This was a 11% decrease from the previous episode, which was watched by 0.828 million household viewers with a 0.19 in the 18-49 demographics.

=== Critical reviews ===
"Denials" received mostly positive reviews. The review aggregator website Rotten Tomatoes reported a 75% approval rating for the episode, based on 8 reviews, with an average rating of 7.4/10.

Manuel Betancourt of The A.V. Club gave the episode an "A" grade and wrote, "As last week's episode showcased, The White Lotus is at its best not only when it distills its many preoccupations into thorny one-on-one interactions that serve as catnip for Emmy voters but when it stages a friction between the world these characters live in and the world a week surrounded by a new culture offers them. This is arguably the promise of travel: the ability to witness a different kind of way of being. But even as that's happening at an individual level for many of these characters, it's obvious Mike White is also presenting a rather robust case against the American way of life."

Alan Sepinwall of Rolling Stone wrote, "On a series that has already featured Armond pooping on camera, Tanya shooting all the gays, and Portia walking in on Leo having sex with his “uncle,” competition for the Most Shocking White Lotus Moment Ever is stiff, but this development is definitely up there." Proma Khosla of IndieWire gave the episode a "B+" grade and wrote, "Mike White's series might start and end with a death every season, but the show is and always has been a social satire, with both family and sexual dynamics included in that commentary — so why not combine the two, and on the top network for incest? Episode 6's revelations put the viewer very much in Chloe and Chelsea's POV, assessing the brothers' overall dynamic with morbid fascination."

Amanda Whiting of Vulture gave the episode a 4 star rating out of 5 and wrote, "“Denials” isn't so much an episode of television but its aftermath. Last week's “Full Moon Party” was taut; storylines overlapped in ways literal, spiritual, and metaphorical. This week, we deal with the scattered fallout from that meticulously choreographed explosion, and we learn how jaw-droppingly far some guests pushed the limits of “What happens in Thailand stays in Thailand.”" Erik Kain of Forbes wrote, "The White Lotus continues to slowly build to whatever wild conclusion is in store for us, but it sure is taking its time. I say that not to be critical of Season 3's pacing, but I am a little surprised that there hasn't been a bit more cross-pollination between the story lines at this stage of the game. That looks to be changing soon enough, however, with a big dinner party schedule for our ritzy guests."

Noel Murray of The New York Times wrote, "while there is more anticipation-building than action this week, White does develop the season's major themes in ways that help them strike a little deeper. Over and over, as they face crises mostly of their own making, many of these characters find themselves asking: Is there a better way to live?" Brady Langmann of Esquire wrote, "episode 6 finally delivers the deeper explorations of spirituality that we expect from season 3. Don't get me wrong, Sam Rockwell's monologue from episode 5 was great. But I loved that this episode had an earnest note of spirituality in our smartphone life."

Yvonne Villareal of Los Angeles Times wrote, "I know the producers have said that this is not for shock value, and I believe them, but holy moly, someone better make sure Victoria is appropriately medicated by then." Helena Hunt of The Ringer wrote, "As the monk Luang Por Teera says: “Everyone runs from pain towards the pleasure. But when they get there, only find more pain. You cannot outrun pain.” Episode 6 is the inevitable hangover from all of last week's parties, because in Mike White's universe, there can be no wild times without some karmic reckoning."
