= Killer Instincts =

- The White Lotus episode
- Episode no.: Season 3 Episode 7
- Directed by: Mike White
- Written by: Mike White
- Cinematography by: Ben Kutchins
- Editing by: John M. Valerio
- Original air date: March 30, 2025
- Running time: 59 minutes

Guest appearances
- Nicholas Duvernay as Zion Lindsey; Arnas Fedaravicius as Valentin; Christian Friedel as Fabian; Julian Kostov as Aleksei; Yuri Kolokolnikov as Vlad; Charlotte Le Bon as Chloe

Episode chronology
← Previous "Denials"	Next → "Amor Fati"
- The White Lotus season 3

"Killer Instincts" is the seventh episode of the third season of the American black comedy drama anthology television series The White Lotus. It is the 20th overall episode of the series and was written and directed by series creator Mike White. It originally aired on HBO on March 30, 2025, and was available on Max on the same date.

The series follows the guests and employees of the fictional White Lotus resort chain. The season is set in Thailand, and follows the guests, including Rick Hatchett and his girlfriend Chelsea; Timothy Ratliff, his wife Victoria, and their children Saxon, Piper, and Lochlan; Jaclyn Lemon and her friends Kate and Laurie; White Lotus Hawaii employee Belinda; and White Lotus Thailand staff Pornchai, Mook, and Gaitok. In the episode, Saxon attends Chloe's party, while Rick and Frank meet the Hollingers at their house.

According to Nielsen Media Research, the episode was seen by an estimated 956,000 household viewers and gained a 0.23 ratings share among adults aged 18–49. The episode received generally positive reviews from critics, with praise for the performances (particularly Carrie Coon and Patrick Schwarzenegger) and build-up to the finale, although many criticized the pacing and underdeveloped subplots.

== Plot ==
Rick (Walton Goggins) and Frank (Sam Rockwell), posing as a film producer and director respectively, meet with Sritala (Patravadi Mejudhon) and Jim Hollinger (Scott Glenn) at their home to discuss Sritala starring in a Hollywood film. Rick invites Jim to speak privately about doing business in Thailand and they go to his office.

Saxon (Patrick Schwarzenegger) attends a party at Greg's home with his parents Timothy (Jason Isaacs) and Victoria (Parker Posey). He encounters Chelsea (Aimee Lou Wood) and suggests that she is like many of the women there who stay with older, unattractive men for their money. Chelsea denies this, saying she and Rick are soulmates.

Timothy continues to abuse his wife's lorazepam and fantasize about killing her and himself. Saxon confronts him and demands to know what is happening, but Timothy denies anything is wrong. At the monastery, Lochlan (Sam Nivola) tells Piper (Sarah Catherine Hook) that he wants to join her on her yearlong stay, but she does not appear pleased at his decision.

Chloe (Charlotte Le Bon) tells Saxon that "Gary" is fine with her infidelity because he used to watch his parents have sex as a child and would be aroused by watching her have sex with Saxon. Saxon is disturbed by the suggestion and refuses to participate. He later walks Chelsea to her room and tries to convince her that he is not as one-dimensional as she thinks, asking her to help him evolve spiritually. She agrees to help him meditate, but when it becomes clear that this is a pretext for flirting with her, she gives him several self-help books and asks him to leave.

At the party, Greg (Jon Gries) privately talks with Belinda (Natasha Rothwell). He admits his true identity but claims he had nothing to do with Tanya's death and came to Thailand to escape the unfounded accusations that he murdered her. He suggests Tanya would have wanted him to live his life in peace, and offers Belinda $100,000 to open her wellness center in exchange for honoring that wish. Frightened, Belinda asks for time to consider it and leaves with her son, Zion (Nicholas Duvernay). Later, Zion urges Belinda to accept the money, suggesting that Greg will come after her and possibly kill them both if they do not come to terms.

At the resort, Jaclyn (Michelle Monaghan), Kate (Leslie Bibb) and Laurie (Carrie Coon) have a tense dinner, arguing about Laurie's judgmentalness and life choices. Laurie leaves to watch a Muay Thai fight with Valentin (Arnas Fedaravicius), Aleksei (Julian Kostov), and Vlad (Yuri Kolokolnikov).

Gaitok (Tayme Thapthimthong) and Mook (Lalisa Manobal) go on a date and discuss Gaitok's future plans. He tells her that, as a Buddhist, he takes the principles of nonviolence seriously, but Mook is unimpressed, saying he should be more ambitious and realistic about life. They attend the Muay Thai fight, where Gaitok recognizes Aleksei and Vlad as the men who robbed the boutique (Note: As seen in "Special Treatments".) while Valentin distracted him at the gate as they forced their way through.

In Bangkok, Rick confronts Jim for murdering his father over a land deal decades earlier. Jim appears to recognize the name of Rick's mother, but does not admit culpability for the killing. Rick points a gun at Jim, but cannot bring himself to shoot him, settling for knocking over his chair. He and Frank quickly leave and dispose of the gun downtown. Rick says he has found closure by confronting Jim. Rick and Frank celebrate by going to a nightclub and bringing some local women to a hotel room, where Frank drinks excessively and does drugs. Rick does not indulge, only smiling contentedly.

After the fight, Laurie goes to Aleksei's home and they have sex. He later tries to convince Laurie to give him $10,000 for his ill mother in Russia, but Laurie says she does not have that much money. At that moment, Aleksei's girlfriend returns, forcing Laurie to escape through a window.

Timothy fantasizes again about killing Victoria and himself, but this time visualizes killing Saxon as well. He goes to find the gun he had stashed in the villa, but finds it missing.

== Production ==
=== Development ===
The episode was written and directed by series creator Mike White. This was White's 20th writing and directorial credit for the series.

=== Writing ===
Of Rick's decision to spare Jim, Walton Goggins said, "It was so deeply spiritual and communing with God, because it was peace and serenity on a level that he has never experienced in his life. All it took him to get to that place, in that moment, on that sofa, for everything in the world, for the first time in his life, to be OK." He added, "It took me six months and seven hours of this experience to smile, to really smile. It's not joy, but there's contentment or peace for a moment. Other actors would've arrived at that very different way and lived their life."

Jason Isaacs said of Timothy's contemplation of murder-suicide, "At this point, Tim is thinking Piper will probably be all right. I don't know what he thinks about Lochlan, but he knows Lochlan isn't like him. He doesn't have the same set of values, so Tim has some hope for the other two kids. But he's thinking Victoria and Saxon will be better off. By the way, he's thinking about all of this while he's out of his mind on drugs. But I'm not sure that he's wrong. From his mindset, it seems like the most sensible choice."

== Reception ==
=== Viewers ===
In its original American broadcast, "Killer Instincts" was seen by an estimated 956,000 household viewers with a 0.23 in the 18-49 demographic. This means that 0.23% of all households with televisions watched the episode. This was a 28% increase from the previous episode, which was watched by 744,000 household viewers with a 0.19 in the 18-49 demographic.

=== Critical reviews ===
"Killer Instincts" received generally positive reviews. The review aggregator website Rotten Tomatoes reported a 78% approval rating for the episode, based on 9 reviews, with an average rating of 7.8/10.

Manuel Betancourt of The A.V. Club gave the episode a "B" grade and wrote, "The episode feels like it was all table-setting for a explosive finale that has, perhaps, too many subplots to tidy up before we check out of the White Lotus this time around. And so, with Gaitok making a case for nonviolence as he goes out on a date with Mook—a key tenet of Buddhism that permeates all we've seen this season—we're now headed to a finale that will no doubt end in anything but."

Alan Sepinwall of Rolling Stone wrote, "Rather than use the extra time to go deeper into each storyline, it feels like White has just been repeating certain beats over and over, in case we didn't quite understand that the three friends have been having the same arguments for decades, or that Victoria doesn't care for anything about the world outside of her immediate social circle. And several other subplots, like the ones involving Belinda and Gaitok, have barely gotten going at all." Proma Khosla of IndieWire gave the episode an "A–" grade and wrote, "it may not last, but the most monumental choice in this episode might be Rick choosing not to hurt the man who killed his father. After Episode 6's memorable combination of Rick and Frank having a conversation that rattled at least one of them to his core, the duo continue their shenanigans with an absolutely farcical visit to Jim and Sritala's home. After dominating the previous night's conversation, Frank is tasked with bluffing through his entire fake meeting with Sritala, an ordeal so taxing that he breaks his sobriety."

Amanda Whiting of Vulture gave the episode 4 stars out of 5 and wrote, "After seven hours of watching these people lumber around this fragile world, no one stands out as competent enough or sinister enough to commit a murder on purpose. As it was after the season premiere, my money is on the monkeys." Erik Kain of Forbes wrote, "it's filled with great moments. Great little character moments, pockets of humor (Parker Posey to the rescue) and gorgeous cinematography, sets, and a location to die for (or in, as the case may be). But those moments haven't transcended into a compelling overall story."

Noel Murray of The New York Times wrote, "Throughout this episode, two images recur: the Great Buddha of Thailand statue in Bangkok, and the Muay Thai fighters that several characters go watch. White offers these as opposing options, ever-present: the meditative and the passionate. The White Lotus is concerned primarily with the choices people make between those two, while caught up in the moment." Brady Langmann of Esquire wrote, "It's a shame that we're finally going deep on spirituality, violence, expectations, fear, loathing, and much more in Thailand just as this season is about to end. A couple weeks ago, I criticized season 3 for spinning its wheels a hair too long; I felt like The White Lotus's usually exceptional slow burn of character introductions and ceaseless foreshadowing should not have lasted five episodes. Now, I feel like the HBO series is finally following through with the terms of engagement from a White Lotus season set at a wellness resort in Thailand. Meaning: We're on the receiving end of some deep fucking questions."

Yvonne Villareal of Los Angeles Times wrote, "The storytelling from some of these characters has me flashing back to Are you Afraid of the Dark? I love how Chelsea took it all in like it was a moderate level of crazy but not completely bonkers. I feel like Chloe is trying to set up a scenario that would set Greg/Gary off, but I don't know why." Claire McNear of The Ringer wrote, "There were a lot of finallys in this week's episode. Gaitok and Mook finally had their first date, which featured a questionably romantic Muay Thai excursion. And finally, Greg, a.k.a. Gary, squared with Belinda. Yes, he is who she thinks he is, and yes, his poor, beloved wife, Tanya, met a violent—did you say suspicious?—end in Italy. But him living large in Thailand is what Tanya would have wanted."

=== Accolades ===
TVLine named Carrie Coon the "Performer of the Week" for the week of April 5, 2025, for her performance in the episode. The site wrote, "Aleksei took the opportunity to hit Laurie up for money, and Coon seamlessly transitioned from sincerely sympathizing to politely fending the guy off. Then she even gave us some physical comedy as Aleksei's jealous ex came knocking on his door, leaving Laurie to scurry out of bed half-naked and then shimmy out of a window, getting slapped in the head by his ex on the way out. It was a rude awakening for Laurie that maybe a vacation fling isn't worth the trouble—and a welcome reminder that, even among a stacked cast, Coon is in a class by herself."
