= Amor Fati (The White Lotus) =

- The White Lotus episode
- Episode no.: Season 3 Episode 8
- Directed by: Mike White
- Written by: Mike White
- Cinematography by: Ben Kutchins
- Editing by: John M. Valerio; Scott Turner
- Original air date: April 6, 2025
- Running time: 90 minutes

Guest appearances
- Nicholas Duvernay as Zion Lindsey; Arnas Fedaravicius as Valentin; Christian Friedel as Fabian; Dom Hetrakul as Pornchai; Yuri Kolokolnikov as Vlad; Julian Kostov as Aleksei; Charlotte Le Bon as Chloe; Morgana O'Reilly as Pam; Shalini Peiris as Amrita

Episode chronology
| ← Previous "Killer Instincts" | Next → — |
- The White Lotus season 3

"Amor Fati" is the eighth episode and season finale of the third season of the American black comedy drama anthology television series The White Lotus. It is the 21st overall episode of the series and was written and directed by series creator Mike White. It originally aired on HBO on April 6, 2025, and was available on Max on the same date. It is the longest episode of the series, with a runtime of 90 minutes.

The series follows the guests and employees of the fictional White Lotus resort chain. The season is set in Thailand, and follows the guests, including Rick Hatchett and his girlfriend, Chelsea; Timothy Ratliff, his wife Victoria, and their children Saxon, Piper, and Lochlan; Jaclyn Lemon and her friends Kate and Laurie; White Lotus Hawaii employee Belinda; and White Lotus Thailand staff Pornchai, Mook, and Gaitok. In the episode, Rick returns to the hotel, while Timothy makes a dangerous decision for his family. Meanwhile, Laurie explains her role in her life to Jaclyn and Kate, while Gaitok debates exposing Valentin's role in the robbery.

According to Nielsen Media Research, the episode was seen by an estimated 1.37 million household viewers and gained a 0.35 ratings share among adults aged 18–49. It received positive reviews from critics, who praised the performances (particularly Carrie Coon's and Aimee Lou Wood's), tension, cinematography, and closure to the storylines. Others criticized the narrative loose ends, characterization, and writing, saying the finale lacked the emotional catharsis of previous seasons. The episode received 11 nominations at the 77th Primetime Emmy Awards, with Carrie Coon, Walton Goggins, Jason Isaacs, Natasha Rothwell, and Aimee Lou Wood submitting the episode to support their nominations in their respective acting categories.

== Plot ==
Rick (Walton Goggins) returns to the resort and happily reunites with Chelsea (Aimee Lou Wood). Gaitok (Tayme Thapthimthong) talks to Valentin (Arnas Fedaravicius) and raises his suspicion that Valentin and his friends were behind the boutique robbery. Valentin begs him not to report it. Gaitok considers resigning from his job, but his superior insists he is a good security guard.

Piper (Sarah Catherine Hook) and Lochlan (Sam Nivola) return to the hotel after their monastery stay. Piper tells Victoria (Parker Posey) that she didn't enjoy it because she cannot live without the material comforts of home, which pleases Victoria. Lochlan attempts to talk to Saxon (Patrick Schwarzenegger) about their drug-fueled incestuous encounter, saying he only wanted to make Saxon happy. Saxon tells him to forget everything that happened. Timothy (Jason Isaacs) asks Lochlan whether he thinks he could live without money, and he says he thinks he could. Remembering their villa is surrounded by poisonous fruit trees, Timothy takes some fruit and pulverizes the seeds in a blender.

That night, Timothy puts the seeds in cocktails he serves himself and his family, sparing only Lochlan. He watches them begin to drink, but has second thoughts and stops them. The next morning, Lochlan makes a protein shake in the blender, unknowingly including the remnants of the poisonous seeds. He vomits and loses consciousness. A horrified Timothy finds him, and he wakes in his father's arms, saying he saw God.

At Greg's (Jon Gries) home, Zion (Nicholas Duvernay) asks Greg for more money so that Belinda (Natasha Rothwell) can start a spa business, suggesting $5 million. Later, they discover Greg has transferred the money. Belinda plans to leave Thailand the next day to avoid further interactions with Greg. She tells Pornchai (Dom Hetrakul) that her circumstances have changed and she is leaving immediately, dashing his hopes of starting a business with her.

Laurie (Carrie Coon), Jaclyn (Michelle Monaghan), and Kate (Leslie Bibb) have a final dinner at the resort together. Jaclyn and Kate say they have had a wonderful week, but Laurie says she's been sad the entire time. She says she has struggled to find meaning in her life through work, love, and motherhood, and now realizes that her friendships are what truly sustain her. The three women reaffirm their bonds.

Jim and Sritala Hollinger arrive at the resort and arrange to take a photo with Jaclyn before she leaves. Jim spots Rick in the dining room and confronts him, showing he is armed. He insults Rick's mother and says his father was not a good man. Shaken, Rick returns to Chelsea, who begs him not to act on his anger. Rick begs Amrita (Shalini Peiris) for guidance, but she asks him to wait until she has finished her session with Zion.

Rick sees the Hollingers taking their photo with Jaclyn nearby and notices the bodyguards have stepped away. He accosts Jim, takes his gun, and shoots him twice in the chest. Sritala tells Rick that Jim was his father. The bodyguards shoot at Rick, who kills them both, but Chelsea is killed in the shootout. On Sritala's orders, Gaitok shoots Rick dead.

On the boat leaving the resort, the Ratliffs are given back their phones; Timothy tells his family that everything is about to change, but they will get through it because family is the most important thing. Gaitok, now a member of Sritala's security detail, is embraced by Mook (Lalisa Manobal). Belinda and Zion happily leave the resort on a private boat, waving back to the White Lotus staff, including a disheartened Pornchai.

== Production ==
=== Development ===
The episode was written and directed by series creator Mike White. This was White's 21st writing and directorial credit for the series.

=== Writing ===
According to executive producer David Bernad, White wrote six fake endings for the episode to prevent leaks. Bernad added, "when we shot the ending scene, it's a locked down set. So no one really has access to what we were shooting and there would be no non-White Lotus participants ever seeing what we're doing."

White compared the ending for Rick and Chelsea to a Greek tragedy, "someone killing the thing they love while trying to get some revenge." Wood had known since her callback audition with White that Chelsea was doomed. She later recalled that White had scripted some last words for Chelsea, then deleted them "because words are her armor". Having her die in silence was more powerful, he felt, because Rick "just has to look at her in her purest form and he sees her and he loves her".

When Coon first saw the "big end-of-season monologue" White wrote for her, she knew it was the "heart of the season". She said the other storylines were "quite big and transgressive and Greek" while the storyline of the friendship of Jaclyn, Kate, and Laurie "felt smaller and more disconnected", which meant the audience would find it more relatable and accessible.

Of having Gaitok pull the trigger, White said, "One of the concepts around Buddhism is nonviolence. To take a guy that you're really rooting for and that you understand his sensitive nature and becoming a hero to his girl and a hero to his work, and the only way he can do it is by going against his spiritual beliefs."

White called the Ratliffs' ending "bittersweet", saying, "Life goes on past this personal valley, but what's going to happen without their comforts? I don't think Victoria is someone who can live in poverty. I'm sure she can come up with some other solution." Of Belinda's decision to accept Greg's money, he said, "I just thought it would be a fun way to have somebody else benefit from this tragedy that befell Tanya."

=== Filming ===
The original cut of the episode was over two and a half hours long.

According to Coon, filming Laurie's monologue was difficult because it was shot in an open-air atrium in extreme heat and humidity: "Shooting in that atrium is like shooting in a greenhouse. It's the hottest I've ever been in my life. We were pouring sweat. So that was the first obstacle." After White directed her to try "picking up the pace a little bit", the third take ended up in the final cut.

White's decision to have Rick do all the talking while Chelsea died made filming the "intense" scene more challenging for both Goggins and Wood. Goggins had to literally carry all the weight, both physically and emotionally, on the shoot's hottest day. The show's stunt coordinators choreographed how Goggins could safely pick up Wood (playing Chelsea's corpse), carry her down the boardwalk, and then fall together into the pond after he was shot by Gaitok, which required "a lot of trust": "I was just gone and it was him doing all the work. He did that walk so many times". Before that, Wood had to listen to Rick's anguished grief and not react since Chelsea was dying, despite her impulse "to get up and go, 'No, I'm here!'"

Coon also remembered that White intentionally chose to have Jaclyn, Kate, and Laurie appear relatively placid on the final boat ride away from the island despite having just survived a mass murder (Jim, Rick, Chelsea, and the two bodyguards). Jaclyn is still "processing" the experience, "Laurie is there to be practical, and help her", and Kate has a "moment of contemplation".

== Reception ==
=== Viewers ===
In its original American broadcast, "Amor Fati" was seen by an estimated 1.37 million household viewers with a 0.35 in the 18–49 demographic. This means that 0.35% of all households with televisions watched the episode. This was a 43% increase from the previous episode, which was watched by 956,000 household viewers with a 0.23 in the 18–49 demographic.

=== Critical reviews ===
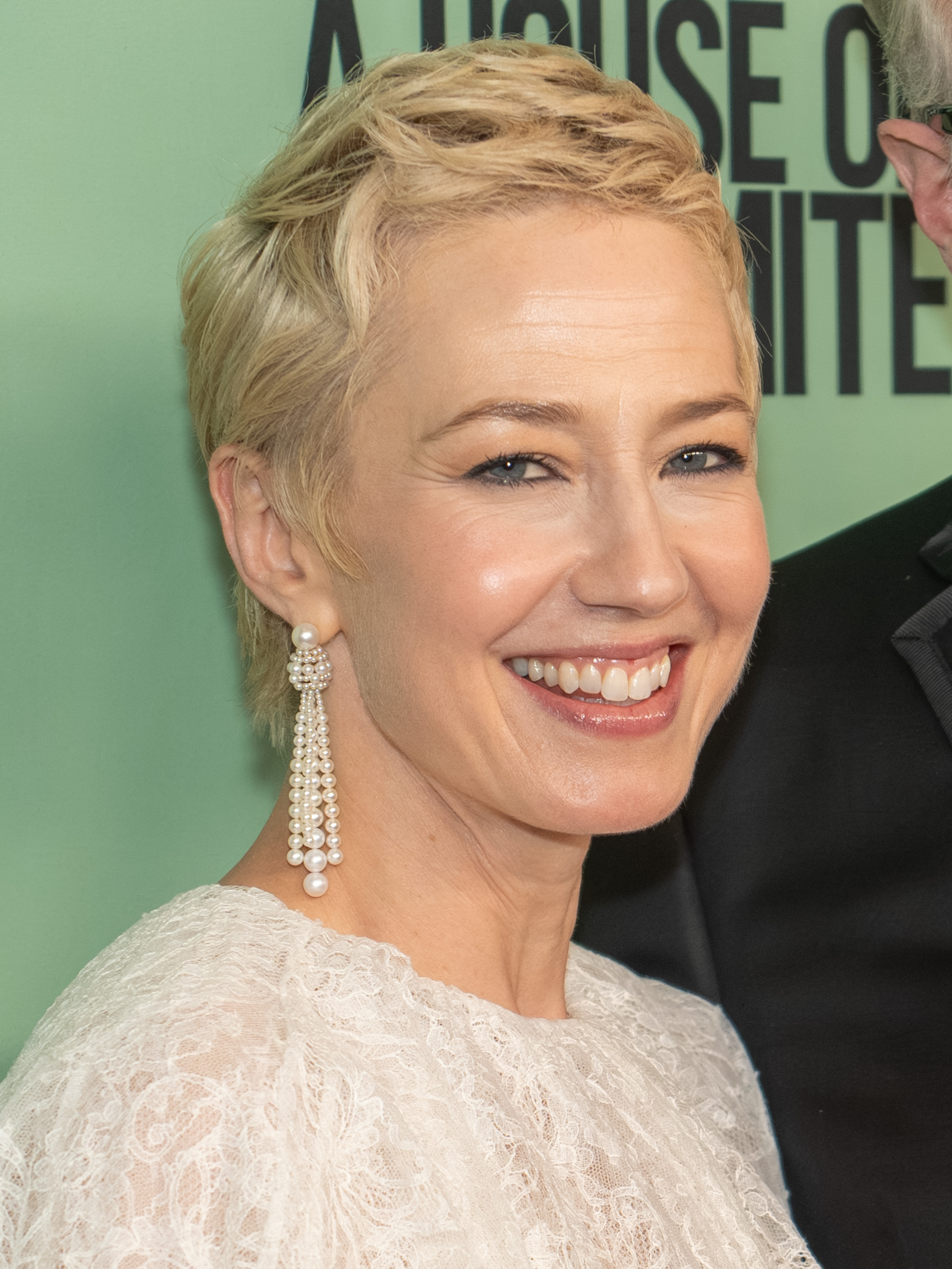
Carrie Coon garnered acclaim for her performance in the episode.

On the review aggregator website Rotten Tomatoes, 75% of 16 critics' reviews are positive, with an average rating of 7.3/10.

Manuel Betancourt of The A.V. Club gave the episode an A grade and wrote, "Giving himself a full 90 minutes to disentangle the many thorny threads he's unspooled for the entire season, White ended up offering a Shakespearean kind of tragedy. ('Nothing from Nothing', the song that closes out the episode, echoes the King Lear line 'Nothing will come of nothing'.) Which means that the very issue of fate this episode title alludes to has as much to do with, say, Chelsea's astrology as the narrative machinations of those age-old tragedies."

Alison Herman of Variety wrote, "Only Lochlan's near-death experience, induced by a poisonous protein shake, was a truly superfluous bit of silliness, turning a Vitamix of all things into a weapon in waiting. For the most part, however, The White Lotus managed to convincingly weave together a disparate set of people and ideas into a treatise on the internal nature of satisfaction. Rick and Chelsea may never get to check out, and the Ratliffs sail away into an uncertain and likely penniless future. Those of us at home, however, can walk away with few regrets."

The episode received criticism for its writing. Alan Sepinwall of Rolling Stone wrote that it "summed up all the things that weren't working about Season Three", commenting on the "predictable, contrived, and/or outright silly" resolutions. He said the twist in Rick's revenge quest was unsurprising, and criticized the "Chekhov's blender" plot line. Of the three girlfriends plot, he wrote that Coon, "one of the greatest and most emotionally raw actors working today [delivers] a heartfelt monologue", but "the words she was delivering with such force were wildly at odds with how the character was portrayed throughout the season". He added that the decision for the season to play its finale as "straight drama [...] badly disrupts the tone of the show, and invites a level of scrutiny it simply isn't built for".

Kathryn VanArendonk of Vulture wrote, "There are flashes where it's clear that a sturdier, more balanced approach to this season might have resulted in something transcendent. Instead, season three of The White Lotus dawdles too long, trying to save too much of the good stuff for the end. Oddly, that's exactly the lesson Laurie's monologue was trying to teach and the one White Lotus fails to achieve. It's not about one final moment, or one spectacular achievement of surprise that no one could see coming. The pleasure is supposed to be in the journey."

Liz Shannon Miller of Consequence wrote, "What did we learn about death, aside from the fact that it comes for even the most pure-hearted of us all? Nothing of note. There's no question that White's skill at crafting a wide range of idiosyncratic characters has been a huge factor in the show's buzz factor, as brought to life by the remarkable ensemble this season. But the whole experience ended up feeling more shallow than this ensemble deserved."

The Independent's Adam White wrote, "Everything remotely interesting about the Ratliffs [...] is mostly left to be dealt with off-camera." He lamented that the show's murder mystery aspect took precedence over its signature character studies, "with too many death fakeouts, too many possible murderers, and more Chekhov's guns than the show knew what to do with. And it's ended up making people talk about The White Lotus as if it's Lost or Severance, or some other puzzle-box series riddled with easter eggs and clues that require our solving". He concluded, "White is a master when it comes to interpersonal dynamics and writing about our propensity for cruelty, arrogance and self-involvement. But after these draining eight episodes, he should avoid the mystery trap and stop there."

The New York Times' Noel Murray wrote, "Some characters got happy endings, while some decidedly did not. But there were enough twists to keep viewers guessing until the end." Zachary Moser of Screen Rant rated the episode 8 out of 10, calling it a "satisfying conclusion to a great season", though he called the Ratliffs' storyline "half-baked". Moser also singled out Coon's performance, writing that she "delivers a powerful, perfectly timed speech about how, as you grow, you have to justify your choices".

=== Accolades ===
TVLine named Aimee Lou Wood as an honorable mention for the "Performer of the Week" for the week of April 12, 2025, for her performance in the episode. The site wrote, "We couldn't check out of The White Lotus without singing the praises of Aimee Lou Wood, who managed to stand out among a very talented ensemble with her sparkling work as Rick's love-struck girlfriend Chelsea. [...] Chelsea may have had a tragic ending, but we're comforted by the thought that Wood's time on our TV screens is just beginning.
