= Actor Award for Outstanding Performance by an Ensemble in a Drama Series =

Award given by the Screen Actors Guild

Actor Award for Best Ensemble in a Drama Series
- Awarded for: Outstanding Performance by an Ensemble in a Drama Series
- Location: Los Angeles, California
- Presented by: SAG-AFTRA
- Currently held by: The cast of The Pitt (2025)
- Website: sagawards.org

The Actor Award for Outstanding Performance by a Cast (or Ensemble) in a Drama Series is an award given by the Screen Actors Guild to honor the finest ensemble acting achievements in drama series.

== Eligibility ==
In order for an individual actor to be eligible for an award as part of the ensemble, they must meet one of the following requirements:

- Have a series regular contract, perform, and be credited in a predetermined minimum number of original episodes airing during the eligibility period.
- Have guest star billing, perform, and be credited in a majority (51%) of original episodes during the eligibility period.

In cases of undefined billing in foreign productions where series regular, guest star, and co-star designations are not made, performers must appear in a majority (51 percent) of original episodes aired in the calendar year 2025 for inclusion in the ensemble. Actors with co-star billing are not eligible for inclusion.

== Winners and nominees ==
indicates the winner.

=== 1990s ===
Year	Series	Cast members
1994 (1st)	NYPD Blue	Gordon Clapp, Dennis Franz, Sharon Lawrence, James McDaniel, Gail O'Grady, Jimmy Smits, Nicholas Turturro
1994 (1st)	Chicago Hope	Adam Arkin, Hector Elizondo, Thomas Gibson, Roxanne Hart, Peter MacNicol, E.G. Marshall, Mandy Patinkin
1994 (1st)	ER	George Clooney, Anthony Edwards, Eriq La Salle, Julianna Margulies, Sherry Stringfield, Noah Wyle
1994 (1st)	Law & Order	Jill Hennessy, Steven Hill, S. Epatha Merkerson, Chris Noth, Jerry Orbach, Sam Waterston
1994 (1st)	Picket Fences	Kathy Baker, Don Cheadle, Holly Marie Combs, Kelly Connell, Robert Cornthwaite, Fyvush Finkel, Lauren Holly, Costas Mandylor, Justin Shenkarow, Tom Skerritt, Leigh Taylor-Young, Ray Walston, Adam Wylie
1995 (2nd)	ER	George Clooney, Anthony Edwards, Eriq La Salle, Julianna Margulies, Gloria Reuben, Sherry Stringfield, Noah Wyle
1995 (2nd)	Chicago Hope	Adam Arkin, Peter Berg, Jayne Brook, Vondie Curtis-Hall, Hector Elizondo, Thomas Gibson, Roxanne Hart, Christine Lahti, Peter MacNicol, Mandy Patinkin, Jamey Sheridan
1995 (2nd)	Law & Order	Benjamin Bratt, Jill Hennessy, Steven Hill, S. Epatha Merkerson, Chris Noth, Jerry Orbach, Sam Waterston
1995 (2nd)	NYPD Blue	Gordon Clapp, Kim Delaney, Dennis Franz, Sharon Lawrence, James McDaniel, Justine Miceli, Gail O'Grady, Jimmy Smits, Nicholas Turturro
1995 (2nd)	Picket Fences	Amy Aquino, Kathy Baker, Don Cheadle, Kelly Connell, Fyvush Finkel, Lauren Holly, Costas Mandylor, Marlee Matlin, Justin Shenkarow, Tom Skerritt, Ray Walston, Adam Wylie
1996 (3rd)	ER	George Clooney, Anthony Edwards, Laura Innes, Eriq La Salle, Julianna Margulies, Gloria Reuben, Sherry Stringfield, Noah Wyle
1996 (3rd)	Chicago Hope	Adam Arkin, Peter Berg, Jayne Brook, Rocky Carroll, Vondie Curtis-Hall, Hector Elizondo, Thomas Gibson, Mark Harmon, Christine Lahti, Jamey Sheridan
1996 (3rd)	Law & Order	Benjamin Bratt, Steven Hill, Carey Lowell, S. Epatha Merkerson, Jerry Orbach, Sam Waterston
1996 (3rd)	NYPD Blue	Gordon Clapp, Kim Delaney, Dennis Franz, Sharon Lawrence, James McDaniel, Jimmy Smits, Nicholas Turturro
1996 (3rd)	The X-Files	Gillian Anderson, William B. Davis, David Duchovny, Mitch Pileggi, Steven Williams
1997 (4th)	ER	Maria Bello, George Clooney, Anthony Edwards, Laura Innes, Alex Kingston, Eriq La Salle, Julianna Margulies, Gloria Reuben, Noah Wyle
1997 (4th)	Chicago Hope	Adam Arkin, Peter Berg, Jayne Brook, Rocky Carroll, Vondie Curtis-Hall, Stacy Edwards, Hector Elizondo, Mark Harmon, Christine Lahti
1997 (4th)	Law & Order	Benjamin Bratt, Steven Hill, Carey Lowell, S. Epatha Merkerson, Jerry Orbach, Sam Waterston
1997 (4th)	NYPD Blue	Gordon Clapp, Kim Delaney, Dennis Franz, James McDaniel, Jimmy Smits, Andrea Thompson, Nicholas Turturro
1997 (4th)	The X Files	Gillian Anderson, William B. Davis, David Duchovny, Mitch Pileggi
1998 (5th)	ER	George Clooney, Anthony Edwards, Laura Innes, Alex Kingston, Eriq La Salle, Julianna Margulies, Kellie Martin, Paul McCrane, Gloria Reuben, Noah Wyle
1998 (5th)	Law & Order	Benjamin Bratt, Angie Harmon, Steven Hill, Carey Lowell, S. Epatha Merkerson, Jerry Orbach, Sam Waterston
1998 (5th)	NYPD Blue	Gordon Clapp, Kim Delaney, Dennis Franz, Sharon Lawrence, James McDaniel, Jimmy Smits, Andrea Thompson, Nicholas Turturro
1998 (5th)	The Practice	Michael Badalucco, Lara Flynn Boyle, Lisa Gay Hamilton, Steve Harris, Camryn Manheim, Dylan McDermott, Marla Sokoloff, Kelli Williams
1998 (5th)	The X Files	Gillian Anderson, William B. Davis, David Duchovny, Chris Owens, James Pickens Jr., Mitch Pileggi
1999 (6th)	The Sopranos	Lorraine Bracco, Dominic Chianese, Edie Falco, James Gandolfini, Robert Iler, Michael Imperioli, Nancy Marchand, Vincent Pastore, Jamie-Lynn Sigler, Tony Sirico, Steve Van Zandt
1999 (6th)	ER	Anthony Edwards, Laura Innes, Alex Kingston, Eriq La Salle, Julianna Margulies, Kellie Martin, Paul McCrane, Michael Michele, Erik Palladino, Gloria Reuben, Goran Visnjic, Noah Wyle
1999 (6th)	Law & Order	Angie Harmon, Steven Hill, Jesse L. Martin, S. Epatha Merkerson, Jerry Orbach, Sam Waterston
1999 (6th)	NYPD Blue	Bill Brochtrup, Gordon Clapp, Kim Delaney, Dennis Franz, James McDaniel, Rick Schroder, Andrea Thompson, Nicholas Turturro
1999 (6th)	The Practice	Michael Badalucco, Lara Flynn Boyle, Lisa Gay Hamilton, Steve Harris, Camryn Manheim, Dylan McDermott, Marla Sokoloff, Kelli Williams

=== 2000s ===
Year	Series	Cast members
2000 (7th)	The West Wing	Dulé Hill, Allison Janney, Moira Kelly, Rob Lowe, Janel Moloney, Richard Schiff, Martin Sheen, John Spencer, Bradley Whitford
2000 (7th)	ER	Anthony Edwards, Laura Innes, Alex Kingston, Eriq La Salle, Julianna Margulies, Kellie Martin, Paul McCrane, Michael Michele, Ming-Na, Erik Palladino, Maura Tierney, Goran Visnjic, Noah Wyle
2000 (7th)	Law & Order	Angie Harmon, Jesse L. Martin, S. Epatha Merkerson, Jerry Orbach, Sam Waterston, Dianne Wiest
2000 (7th)	The Practice	Michael Badalucco, Lara Flynn Boyle, Lisa Gay Hamilton, Steve Harris, Camryn Manheim, Dylan McDermott, Marla Sokoloff, Kelli Williams
2000 (7th)	The Sopranos	Lorraine Bracco, Dominic Chianese, Drea de Matteo, Edie Falco, James Gandolfini, Robert Iler, Michael Imperioli, Nancy Marchand, Vincent Pastore, David Proval, Jamie-Lynn Sigler, Tony Sirico, Aida Turturro, Steve Van Zandt
2001 (8th)	The West Wing	Dulé Hill, Allison Janney, Rob Lowe, Janel Moloney, Richard Schiff, Martin Sheen, John Spencer, Bradley Whitford
2001 (8th)	CSI: Crime Scene Investigation	Gary Dourdan, George Eads, Jorja Fox, Paul Guilfoyle, Robert David Hall, Marg Helgenberger, William L. Petersen, Eric Szmanda
2001 (8th)	Law & Order	Jesse L. Martin, S. Epatha Merkerson, Jerry Orbach, Elisabeth Röhm, Sam Waterston, Dianne Wiest
2001 (8th)	Six Feet Under	Lauren Ambrose, Frances Conroy, Rachel Griffiths, Michael C. Hall, Richard Jenkins, Peter Krause, Freddy Rodríguez, Jeremy Sisto, Mathew St. Patrick
2001 (8th)	The Sopranos	Lorraine Bracco, Federico Castelluccio, Dominic Chianese, Drea de Matteo, Edie Falco, James Gandolfini, Robert Iler, Michael Imperioli, Joe Pantoliano, Steve Schirripa, Jamie-Lynn Sigler, Tony Sirico, Aida Turturro, Steve Van Zandt, John Ventimiglia
2002 (9th)	Six Feet Under	Lauren Ambrose, Frances Conroy, Rachel Griffiths, Michael C. Hall, Peter Krause, Freddy Rodríguez, Mathew St. Patrick
2002 (9th)	CSI: Crime Scene Investigation	Gary Dourdan, George Eads, Jorja Fox, Paul Guilfoyle, Robert David Hall, Marg Helgenberger, William L. Petersen, Eric Szmanda
2002 (9th)	The Sopranos	Lorraine Bracco, Federico Castelluccio, Dominic Chianese, Vincent Curatola, Drea de Matteo, Edie Falco, James Gandolfini, Robert Iler, Michael Imperioli, Joe Pantoliano, Steve Schirripa, Jamie-Lynn Sigler, Tony Sirico, Aida Turturro, Steve Van Zandt, John Ventimiglia
2002 (9th)	24	Reiko Aylesworth, Xander Berkeley, Carlos Bernard, Jude Ciccolella, Sarah Clarke, Elisha Cuthbert, Michelle Forbes, Laura Harris, Dennis Haysbert, Penny Johnson, Phillip Rhys, Kiefer Sutherland, Sarah Wynter
2002 (9th)	The West Wing	Stockard Channing, Dulé Hill, Allison Janney, Rob Lowe, Joshua Malina, Janel Moloney, Richard Schiff, Martin Sheen, John Spencer, Lily Tomlin, Bradley Whitford
2003 (10th)	Six Feet Under	Lauren Ambrose, Frances Conroy, Ben Foster, Rachel Griffiths, Michael C. Hall, Peter Krause, Peter Macdissi, Justina Machado, Freddy Rodríguez, Mathew St. Patrick, Lili Taylor, Rainn Wilson
2003 (10th)	CSI: Crime Scene Investigation	Gary Dourdan, George Eads, Jorja Fox, Paul Guilfoyle, Robert David Hall, Marg Helgenberger, William L. Petersen, Eric Szmanda
2003 (10th)	Law & Order	Jesse L. Martin, S. Epatha Merkerson, Jerry Orbach, Elisabeth Röhm, Fred Dalton Thompson, Sam Waterston
2003 (10th)	The West Wing	Stockard Channing, Dulé Hill, Allison Janney, Joshua Malina, Janel Moloney, Richard Schiff, Martin Sheen, John Spencer, Bradley Whitford
2003 (10th)	Without a Trace	Eric Close, Marianne Jean-Baptiste, Anthony LaPaglia, Poppy Montgomery, Enrique Murciano
2004 (11th)	CSI: Crime Scene Investigation	Gary Dourdan, George Eads, Jorja Fox, Paul Guilfoyle, Robert David Hall, Marg Helgenberger, William L. Petersen, Eric Szmanda
2004 (11th)	Six Feet Under	Lauren Ambrose, Frances Conroy, James Cromwell, Idalis DeLeon, Peter Facinelli, Ben Foster, Sprague Grayden, Rachel Griffiths, Michael C. Hall, Peter Krause, Justina Machado, Freddy Rodríguez, Mathew St. Patrick, Mena Suvari, Justin Theroux
2004 (11th)	The Sopranos	Lorraine Bracco, Steve Buscemi, Dominic Chianese, Vincent Curatola, Drea de Matteo, Jamie-Lynn DiScala, Edie Falco, James Gandolfini, Robert Iler, Michael Imperioli, Steve Schirripa, Tony Sirico, Aida Turturro, Steve Van Zandt, John Ventimiglia
2004 (11th)	24	Reiko Aylesworth, Carlos Bernard, Elisha Cuthbert, James Badge Dale, Joaquim de Almeida, Dennis Haysbert, Mary Lynn Rajskub, Paul Schulze, Kiefer Sutherland
2004 (11th)	The West Wing	Stockard Channing, Kristin Chenoweth, Dulé Hill, Allison Janney, Joshua Malina, Mary McCormack, Janel Moloney, Richard Schiff, Martin Sheen, John Spencer, Lily Tomlin, Bradley Whitford
2005 (12th)	Lost	Adewale Akinnuoye-Agbaje, Naveen Andrews, Emilie de Ravin, Matthew Fox, Jorge Garcia, Maggie Grace, Josh Holloway, Malcolm David Kelley, Daniel Dae Kim, Yunjin Kim, Evangeline Lilly, Dominic Monaghan, Terry O'Quinn, Harold Perrineau, Michelle Rodriguez, Ian Somerhalder, Cynthia Watros
2005 (12th)	The Closer	G.W. Bailey, Anthony John Denison, Robert Gossett, Corey Reynolds, Kyra Sedgwick, J.K. Simmons, Jon Tenney
2005 (12th)	Grey's Anatomy	Katherine Heigl
2005 (12th)	Six Feet Under	Lauren Ambrose, Joanna Cassidy, Frances Conroy, James Cromwell, Rachel Griffiths, Michael C. Hall, Tina Holmes, Peter Krause, Justina Machado, Freddy Rodríguez, Jeremy Sisto, Mathew St. Patrick
2005 (12th)	The West Wing	Alan Alda, Kristin Chenoweth, Janeane Garofalo, Dulé Hill, Allison Janney, Joshua Malina, Mary McCormack, Janel Moloney, Teri Polo, Richard Schiff, Martin Sheen, Jimmy Smits, John Spencer, Bradley Whitford
2006 (13th)	Grey's Anatomy	Justin Chambers, Eric Dane, Patrick Dempsey, Katherine Heigl, T.R. Knight, Sandra Oh, James Pickens, Jr., Ellen Pompeo, Sara Ramirez, Kate Walsh, Isaiah Washington, Chandra Wilson
2006 (13th)	Boston Legal	René Auberjonois, Candice Bergen, Craig Bierko, Julie Bowen, William Shatner, James Spader, Mark Valley
2006 (13th)	Deadwood	Jim Beaver, Powers Boothe, Sean Bridgers, W. Earl Brown, Dayton Callie, Brian Cox, Kim Dickens, Brad Dourif, Anna Gunn, John Hawkes, Jeffrey Jones, Paula Malcomson, Gerald McRaney, Ian McShane, Timothy Olyphant, Molly Parker, Leon Rippy, William Sanderson, Brent Sexton, Bree Seanna Wall, Robin Weigert, Titus Welliver
2006 (13th)	The Sopranos	Sharon Angela, Lorraine Bracco, Max Casella, Dominic Chianese, Edie Falco, James Gandolfini, Joseph R. Gannascoli, Dan Grimaldi, Robert Iler, Michael Imperioli, Steven R. Schirripa, Jamie-Lynn Sigler, Tony Sirico, Aida Turturro, Maureen Van Zandt, Steven Van Zandt, Frank Vincent
2006 (13th)	24	Jayne Atkinson, Jude Ciccolella, Roger Cross, Gregory Itzin, Louis Lombardi, James Morrison, Glenn Morshower, Mary Lynn Rajskub, Kim Raver, Jean Smart, Kiefer Sutherland
2007 (14th)	The Sopranos	Greg Antonacci, Lorraine Bracco, Edie Falco, James Gandolfini, Dan Grimaldi, Robert Iler, Michael Imperioli, Arthur J. Nascarella, Steve Schirripa, Matt Servitto, Jamie-Lynn Sigler, Tony Sirico, Aida Turturro, Steve Van Zandt, Frank Vincent
2007 (14th)	Boston Legal	René Auberjonois, Candice Bergen, Julie Bowen, Saffron Burrows, Christian Clemenson, Taraji P. Henson, John Larroquette, William Shatner, James Spader, Tara Summers, Mark Valley, Gary Anthony Williams, Constance Zimmer
2007 (14th)	The Closer	G.W. Bailey, Michael Paul Chan, Raymond Cruz, Anthony John Denison, Robert Gossett, Phillip P. Keene, Gina Ravera, Corey Reynolds, Kyra Sedgwick, J.K. Simmons, Jon Tenney
2007 (14th)	Grey's Anatomy	Justin Chambers, Eric Dane, Patrick Dempsey, Katherine Heigl, T.R. Knight, Chyler Leigh, Sandra Oh, James Pickens, Jr., Ellen Pompeo, Sara Ramirez, Elizabeth Reaser, Brooke Smith, Kate Walsh, Isaiah Washington, Chandra Wilson
2007 (14th)	Mad Men	Bryan Batt, Anne Dudek, Michael Gladis, Jon Hamm, Christina Hendricks, January Jones, Vincent Kartheiser, Robert Morse, Elisabeth Moss, Maggie Siff, John Slattery, Rich Sommer, Aaron Staton
2008 (15th)	Mad Men	Bryan Batt, Alison Brie, Michael Gladis, Jon Hamm, Aaron Hart, Christina Hendricks, January Jones, Vincent Kartheiser, Mark Moses, Elisabeth Moss, Kiernan Shipka, John Slattery, Rich Sommer, Aaron Staton
2008 (15th)	Boston Legal	Candice Bergen, Saffron Burrows, Christian Clemenson, Taraji P. Henson, John Larroquette, William Shatner, James Spader, Tara Summers, Gary Anthony Williams
2008 (15th)	The Closer	G.W. Bailey, Michael Paul Chan, Raymond Cruz, Anthony John Denison, Robert Gossett, Phillip P. Keene, Gina Ravera, Corey Reynolds, Kyra Sedgwick, J.K. Simmons, Jon Tenney
2008 (15th)	Dexter	Preston Bailey, Julie Benz, Jennifer Carpenter, Valerie Cruz, Kristin Dattilo, Michael C. Hall, Desmond Harrington, C.S. Lee, Jason Manuel Olazabal, David Ramsey, James Remar, Christina Robinson, Jimmy Smits, Lauren Vélez, David Zayas
2008 (15th)	House	Lisa Edelstein, Omar Epps, Peter Jacobson, Hugh Laurie, Robert Sean Leonard, Jennifer Morrison, Kal Penn, Jesse Spencer, Olivia Wilde
2009 (16th)	Mad Men	Alexa Alemanni, Bryan Batt, Jared S. Gilmore, Michael Gladis, Jon Hamm, Jared Harris, Christina Hendricks, January Jones, Vincent Kartheiser, Robert Morse, Elisabeth Moss, Kiernan Shipka, John Slattery, Rich Sommer, Christopher Stanley, Aaron Staton
2009 (16th)	The Closer	G.W. Bailey, Michael Paul Chan, Raymond Cruz, Anthony John Denison, Robert Gossett, Phillip P. Keene, Corey Reynolds, Kyra Sedgwick, J.K. Simmons, Jon Tenney
2009 (16th)	Dexter	Preston Bailey, Julie Benz, Jennifer Carpenter, Brando Eaton, Courtney Ford, Michael C. Hall, Desmond Harrington, C.S. Lee, John Lithgow, Rick Peters, James Remar, Christina Robinson, Lauren Vélez, David Zayas
2009 (16th)	The Good Wife	Christine Baranski, Josh Charles, Matt Czuchry, Julianna Margulies, Archie Panjabi, Graham Phillips, Makenzie Vega
2009 (16th)	True Blood	Chris Bauer, Mehcad Brooks, Anna Camp, Nelsan Ellis, Michelle Forbes, Mariana Klaveno, Ryan Kwanten, Todd Lowe, Michael McMillian, Stephen Moyer, Anna Paquin, Jim Parrack, Carrie Preston, William Sanderson, Alexander Skarsgård, Sam Trammell, Rutina Wesley, Deborah Ann Woll

=== 2010s ===
Year	Series	Cast members
2010 (17th)	Boardwalk Empire	Greg Antonacci, Steve Buscemi, Dabney Coleman, Stephen Graham, Paz de la Huerta, Anthony Laciura, Kelly Macdonald, Gretchen Mol, Aleksa Palladino, Vincent Piazza, Michael Pitt, Michael Shannon, Paul Sparks, Michael Stuhlbarg, Erik Weiner, Shea Whigham
2010 (17th)	The Closer	G. W. Bailey, Michael Paul Chan, Raymond Cruz, Robert Gossett, Tony Denison, Corey Reynolds, Kyra Sedgwick, J. K. Simmons, Jon Tenney
2010 (17th)	Dexter	Julie Benz, Jennifer Carpenter, Michael C. Hall, Desmond Harrington, C. S. Lee, Jonny Lee Miller, James Remar, Julia Stiles, Lauren Velez, David Zayas
2010 (17th)	The Good Wife	Christine Baranski, Josh Charles, Alan Cumming, Matt Czuchry, Julianna Margulies, Chris Noth, Archie Panjabi, Graham Phillips
2010 (17th)	Mad Men	Jon Hamm, Jared Harris, Christina Hendricks, January Jones, Vincent Kartheiser, Robert Morse, Elisabeth Moss, Kiernan Shipka, John Slattery, Rich Sommer, Aaron Staton
2011 (18th)	Boardwalk Empire	Steve Buscemi, Dominic Chianese, Robert Clohessy, Dabney Coleman, Charlie Cox, Josie Gallina, Lucy Gallina, Stephen Graham, Jack Huston, Anthony Laciura, Heather Lind, Kelly Macdonald, Declan McTigue, Rory McTigue, Gretchen Mol, Brady Noon, Connor Noon, Kevin O'Rourke, Aleksa Palladino, Jacqueline Pennewill, Vincent Piazza, Michael Pitt, Michael Shannon, Paul Sparks, Michael Stuhlbarg, Peter Van Wagner, Shea Whigham, Michael Kenneth Williams, Anatol Yusef
2011 (18th)	Breaking Bad	Jonathan Banks, Betsy Brandt, Bryan Cranston, Giancarlo Esposito, Anna Gunn, RJ Mitte, Dean Norris, Bob Odenkirk, Aaron Paul
2011 (18th)	Dexter	Billy Brown, Jennifer Carpenter, Josh Cooke, Aimee Garcia, Michael C. Hall, Colin Hanks, Desmond Harrington, Rya Kihlstedt, C.S. Lee, Edward James Olmos, James Remar, Lauren Vélez, David Zayas
2011 (18th)	Game of Thrones	Amrita Acharia, Mark Addy, Alfie Allen, Josef Altin, Sean Bean, Susan Brown, Emilia Clarke, Nikolaj Coster-Waldau, Peter Dinklage, Ron Donachie, Michelle Fairley, Jerome Flynn, Elyes Gabel, Aidan Gillen, Jack Gleeson, Iain Glen, Julian Glover, Kit Harington, Lena Headey, Isaac Hempstead Wright, Conleth Hill, Richard Madden, Jason Momoa, Rory McCann, Ian McElhinney, Luke McEwan, Roxanne McKee, Dar Salim, Mark Stanley, Donald Sumpter, Sophie Turner, Maisie Williams
2011 (18th)	The Good Wife	Christine Baranski, Josh Charles, Alan Cumming, Matt Czuchry, Julianna Margulies, Chris Noth, Archie Panjabi, Graham Phillips, Makenzie Vega
2012 (19th)	Downton Abbey	Hugh Bonneville, Zoe Boyle, Laura Carmichael, Jim Carter, Brendan Coyle, Michelle Dockery, Jessica Brown Findlay, Siobhan Finneran, Joanne Froggatt, Iain Glen, Thomas Howes, Rob James-Collier, Allen Leech, Phyllis Logan, Elizabeth McGovern, Sophie McShera, Lesley Nicol, Amy Nuttall, David Robb, Maggie Smith, Dan Stevens, Penelope Wilton
2012 (19th)	Boardwalk Empire	Steve Buscemi, Chris Caldovino, Bobby Cannavale, Meg Chambers Steedle, Charlie Cox, Jack Huston, Patrick Kennedy, Anthony Laciura, Kelly Macdonald, Gretchen Mol, Vincent Piazza, Michael Shannon, Paul Sparks, Michael Stuhlbarg, Shea Whigham, Michael Kenneth Williams, Anatol Yusef
2012 (19th)	Breaking Bad	Jonathan Banks, Betsy Brandt, Bryan Cranston, Laura Fraser, Anna Gunn, RJ Mitte, Dean Norris, Bob Odenkirk, Aaron Paul, Jesse Plemons, Steven Michael Quezada
2012 (19th)	Mad Men	Ben Feldman, Jay R. Ferguson, Jon Hamm, Jared Harris, Christina Hendricks, January Jones, Vincent Kartheiser, Robert Morse, Elisabeth Moss, Jessica Paré, Teyonah Parris, Kiernan Shipka, John Slattery, Rich Sommer, Aaron Staton
2012 (19th)	Homeland	Morena Baccarin, Timothée Chalamet, Claire Danes, Rupert Friend, David Harewood, Diego Klattenhoff, Damian Lewis, David Marciano, Navid Negahban, Jackson Pace, Mandy Patinkin, Zuleikha Robinson, Morgan Saylor, Jamey Sheridan
2013 (20th)	Breaking Bad	Michael Bowen, Betsy Brandt, Bryan Cranston, Lavell Crawford, Tait Fletcher, Laura Fraser, Anna Gunn, Matthew T. Metzler, RJ Mitte, Dean Norris, Bob Odenkirk, Aaron Paul, Jesse Plemons, Steven Michael Quezada, Kevin Rankin, Patrick Sane
2013 (20th)	Boardwalk Empire	Patricia Arquette, Margot Bingham, Steve Buscemi, Brian Geraghty, Stephen Graham, Erik LaRay Harvey, Jack Huston, Ron Livingston, Domenick Lombardozzi, Gretchen Mol, Ben Rosenfield, Michael Stuhlbarg, Jacob Ware, Shea Whigham, Jeffrey Wright
2013 (20th)	Downton Abbey	Hugh Bonneville, Laura Carmichael, Jim Carter, Brendan Coyle, Michelle Dockery, Jessica Brown Findlay, Siobhan Finneran, Joanne Froggatt, Rob James-Collier, Allen Leech, Phyllis Logan, Elizabeth McGovern, Sophie McShera, Matt Milne, Lesley Nicol, Amy Nuttall, David Robb, Maggie Smith, Ed Speleers, Dan Stevens, Cara Theobold, Penelope Wilton
2013 (20th)	Game of Thrones	Alfie Allen, John Bradley-West, Oona Chaplin, Gwendoline Christie, Emilia Clarke, Nikolaj Coster-Waldau, Mackenzie Crook, Charles Dance, Joe Dempsie, Peter Dinklage, Natalie Dormer, Nathalie Emmanuel, Michelle Fairley, Jack Gleeson, Iain Glen, Kit Harington, Lena Headey, Isaac Hempstead-Wright, Kristofer Hivju, Paul Kaye, Sibel Kekilli, Rose Leslie, Richard Madden, Rory McCann, Michael McElhatton, Ian McElhinney, Philip McGinley, Hannah Murray, Iwan Rheon, Sophie Turner, Carice van Houten, Maisie Williams
2013 (20th)	Homeland	F. Murray Abraham, Sarita Choudhury, Claire Danes, Rupert Friend, Tracy Letts, Damian Lewis, Mandy Patinkin, Morgan Saylor
2014 (21st)	Downton Abbey	Hugh Bonneville, Laura Carmichael, Jim Carter, Brendan Coyle, Michelle Dockery, Kevin Doyle, Joanne Froggatt, Lily James, Rob James-Collier, Allen Leech, Phyllis Logan, Elizabeth McGovern, Sophie McShera, Matt Milne, Lesley Nicol, David Robb, Maggie Smith, Ed Speleers, Cara Theobold, Penelope Wilton
2014 (21st)	Boardwalk Empire	Steve Buscemi, Paul Calderon, Nicholas Calhoun, Louis Cancelmi, John Ellison Conlee, Michael Countryman, Stephen Graham, Domenick Lombardozzi, Noah Lyons, Kelly Macdonald, Boris McGiver, Vincent Piazza, Paul Sparks, Travis Tope, Shea Whigham, Anatol Yusef, Michael Zegen
2014 (21st)	Game of Thrones	Alfie Allen, Josef Altin, Jacob Anderson, John Bradley-West, Dominic Carter, Gwendoline Christie, Emilia Clarke, Nikolaj Coster-Waldau, Ben Crompton, Charles Dance, Peter Dinklage, Natalie Dormer, Nathalie Emmanuel, Iain Glen, Julian Glover, Kit Harington, Lena Headey, Conleth Hill, Rory McCann, Ian McElhinney, Pedro Pascal, Daniel Portman, Mark Stanley, Sophie Turner, Maisie Williams
2014 (21st)	Homeland	Numan Acar, Nazanin Boniadi, Claire Danes, Rupert Friend, Raza Jaffrey, Nimrat Kaur, Tracy Letts, Mark Moses, Michael O'Keefe, Mandy Patinkin, Laila Robins, Maury Sterling
2014 (21st)	House of Cards	Mahershala Ali, Jayne Atkinson, Rachel Brosnahan, Derek Cecil, Nathan Darrow, Michel Gill, Joanna Going, Sakina Jaffrey, Michael Kelly, Mozhan Marno, Gerald McRaney, Molly Parker, Jimmi Simpson, Kevin Spacey, Robin Wright
2015 (22nd)	Downton Abbey	Hugh Bonneville, Laura Carmichael, Jim Carter, Raquel Cassidy, Brendan Coyle, Tom Cullen, Michelle Dockery, Kevin Doyle, Joanne Froggatt, Lily James, Rob James-Collier, Allen Leech, Phyllis Logan, Elizabeth McGovern, Sophie McShera, Lesley Nicol, Julian Ovenden, David Robb, Maggie Smith, Ed Speleers, Penelope Wilton
2015 (22nd)	Game of Thrones	Alfie Allen, Ian Beattie, John Bradley-West, Gwendoline Christie, Emilia Clarke, Michael Condron, Nikolaj Coster-Waldau, Ben Crompton, Liam Cunningham, Stephen Dillane, Peter Dinklage, Nathalie Emmanuel, Tara Fitzgerald, Jerome Flynn, Brian Fortune, Joel Fry, Aidan Gillen, Iain Glen, Kit Harington, Lena Headey, Michiel Huisman, Hannah Murray, Brenock O'Connor, Daniel Portman, Iwan Rheon, Owen Teale, Sophie Turner, Carice van Houten, Maisie Williams, Tom Wlaschiha
2015 (22nd)	Homeland	F. Murray Abraham, Atheer Adel, Claire Danes, Alexander Fehling, Rupert Friend, Nina Hoss, René Ifrah, Mark Ivanir, Sebastian Koch, Miranda Otto, Mandy Patinkin, Sarah Sokolovic
2015 (22nd)	House of Cards	Mahershala Ali, Derek Cecil, Nathan Darrow, Michael Kelly, Elizabeth Marvel, Molly Parker, Jimmi Simpson, Kevin Spacey, Robin Wright
2015 (22nd)	Mad Men	Sola Bamis, Stephanie Drake, Jay R. Ferguson, Bruce Greenwood, Jon Hamm, Christina Hendricks, January Jones, Vincent Kartheiser, Elisabeth Moss, Kevin Rahm, Kiernan Shipka, John Slattery, Rich Sommer, Aaron Staton, Mason Vale Cotton
2016 (23rd)	Stranger Things	Millie Bobby Brown, Cara Buono, Joe Chrest, Natalia Dyer, David Harbour, Charlie Heaton, Joe Keery, Gaten Matarazzo, Caleb McLaughlin, Matthew Modine, Rob Morgan, John Paul Reynolds, Winona Ryder, Noah Schnapp, Mark Steger, Finn Wolfhard
2016 (23rd)	The Crown	Claire Foy, Clive Francis, Harry Hadden-Paton, Victoria Hamilton, Jared Harris, Daniel Ings, Billy Jenkins, Vanessa Kirby, John Lithgow, Lizzy McInnerny, Ben Miles, Jeremy Northam, Nicholas Rowe, Matt Smith, Pip Torrens, Harriet Walter
2016 (23rd)	Downton Abbey	Samantha Bond, Hugh Bonneville, Patrick Brennan, Laura Carmichael, Jim Carter, Raquel Cassidy, Paul Copley, Brendan Coyle, Michelle Dockery, Kevin Doyle, Michael C. Fox, Joanne Froggatt, Matthew Goode, Harry Hadden-Paton, Rob James-Collier, Sue Johnston, Allen Leech, Phyllis Logan, Elizabeth McGovern, Sophie McShera, Lesley Nicol, Douglas Reith, David Robb, Maggie Smith, Jeremy Swift, Howard Ward, Penelope Wilton
2016 (23rd)	Game of Thrones	Alfie Allen, Jacob Anderson, Dean-Charles Chapman, Emilia Clarke, Nikolaj Coster-Waldau, Liam Cunningham, Peter Dinklage, Nathalie Emmanuel, Iain Glen, Kit Harington, Lena Headey, Conleth Hill, Kristofer Hivju, Michiel Huisman, Faye Marsay, Jonathan Pryce, Sophie Turner, Carice van Houten, Gemma Whelan, Maisie Williams
2016 (23rd)	Westworld	Ben Barnes, Ingrid Bolsø Berdal, Ed Harris, Luke Hemsworth, Anthony Hopkins, Sidse Babett Knudsen, James Marsden, Leonardo Nam, Thandie Newton, Talulah Riley, Rodrigo Santoro, Angela Sarafyan, Jimmi Simpson, Ptolemy Slocum, Evan Rachel Wood, Shannon Woodward, Jeffrey Wright
2017 (24th)	This Is Us	Eris Baker, Alexandra Breckenridge, Sterling K. Brown, Lonnie Chavis, Mackenzie Hancsicsak, Justin Hartley, Faithe Herman, Ron Cephas Jones, Chrissy Metz, Mandy Moore, Chris Sullivan, Milo Ventimiglia, Susan Kelechi Watson, Hannah Zeile
2017 (24th)	The Crown	Claire Foy, Victoria Hamilton, Vanessa Kirby, Anton Lesser, Matt Smith
2017 (24th)	Game of Thrones	Alfie Allen, Jacob Anderson, Pilou Asbæk, Hafþór Júlíus Björnsson, John Bradley West, Jim Broadbent, Gwendoline Christie, Emilia Clarke, Nikolaj Coster-Waldau, Liam Cunningham, Peter Dinklage, Richard Dormer, Nathalie Emmanuel, James Faulkner, Jerome Flynn, Aidan Gillen, Iain Glen, Kit Harington, Lena Headey, Isaac Hempstead Wright, Conleth Hill, Kristofer Hivju, Tom Hopper, Anton Lesser, Rory McCann, Staz Nair, Richard Rycroft, Sophie Turner, Rupert Vansittart, Maisie Williams
2017 (24th)	The Handmaid's Tale	Madeline Brewer, Amanda Brugel, Ann Dowd, O. T. Fagbenle, Joseph Fiennes, Tattiawna Jones, Max Minghella, Elisabeth Moss, Yvonne Strahovski, Samira Wiley
2017 (24th)	Stranger Things	Sean Astin, Millie Bobby Brown, Cara Buono, Joe Chrest, Catherine Curtin, Natalia Dyer, David Harbour, Charlie Heaton, Joe Keery, Gaten Matarazzo, Caleb McLaughlin, Dacre Montgomery, Paul Reiser, Winona Ryder, Noah Schnapp, Sadie Sink, Finn Wolfhard
2018 (25th)	This Is Us	Eris Baker, Alexandra Breckenridge, Sterling K. Brown, Niles Fitch, Mackenzie Hancsicsak, Justin Hartley, Faithe Herman, Jon Huertas, Melanie Liburd, Chrissy Metz, Mandy Moore, Lyric Ross, Chris Sullivan, Milo Ventimiglia, Susan Kelechi Watson, Hannah Zeile
2018 (25th)	The Americans	Anthony Arkin, Scott Cohen, Brandon J. Dirden, Noah Emmerich, Laurie Holden, Margo Martindale, Matthew Rhys, Costa Ronin, Keri Russell, Keidrich Sellati, Miriam Shor, Holly Taylor
2018 (25th)	Better Call Saul	Jonathan Banks, Rainer Bock, Ray Campbell, Giancarlo Esposito, Michael Mando, Bob Odenkirk, Rhea Seehorn
2018 (25th)	The Handmaid's Tale	Alexis Bledel, Madeline Brewer, Amanda Brugel, Ann Dowd, O. T. Fagbenle, Joseph Fiennes, Nina Kiri, Max Minghella, Elisabeth Moss, Yvonne Strahovski, Sydney Sweeney, Bahia Watson
2018 (25th)	Ozark	Jason Bateman, Lisa Emery, Skylar Gaertner, Julia Garner, Darren Goldstein, Jason Butler Harner, Carson Holmes, Sofia Hublitz, Laura Linney, Trevor Long, Janet McTeer, Peter Mullan, Jordana Spiro, Charlie Tahan, Robert Treveiler, Harris Yulin
2019 (26th)	The Crown	Marion Bailey, Helena Bonham Carter, Olivia Colman, Charles Dance, Ben Daniels, Erin Doherty, Charles Edwards, Tobias Menzies, Josh O'Connor, Sam Phillips, David Rintoul, Jason Watkins
2019 (26th)	Big Little Lies	Iain Armitage, Darby Camp, Chloe Coleman, Cameron Crovetti, Nicholas Crovetti, Laura Dern, Martin Donovan, Merrin Dungey, Crystal Fox, Ivy George, Nicole Kidman, Zoë Kravitz, Kathryn Newton, Jeffrey Nordling, Denis O'Hare, Adam Scott, Alexander Skarsgård, Douglas Smith, Meryl Streep, James Tupper, Robin Weigert, Reese Witherspoon, Shailene Woodley
2019 (26th)	Game of Thrones	Alfie Allen, Jacob Anderson, Pilou Asbæk, John Bradley West, Gwendoline Christie, Emilia Clarke, Nikolaj Coster-Waldau, Ben Crompton, Liam Cunningham, Joe Dempsie, Peter Dinklage, Richard Dormer, Nathalie Emmanuel, Jerome Flynn, Iain Glen, Kit Harington, Lena Headey, Isaac Hempstead Wright, Conleth Hill, Kristofer Hivju, Rory McCann, Hannah Murray, Staz Nair, Daniel Portman, Bella Ramsey, Richard Rycroft, Sophie Turner, Rupert Vansittart, Maisie Williams
2019 (26th)	The Handmaid's Tale	Alexis Bledel, Madeline Brewer, Amanda Brugel, Ann Dowd, O. T. Fagbenle, Joseph Fiennes, Kristen Gutoskie, Nina Kiri, Ashleigh LaThrop, Elisabeth Moss, Yvonne Strahovski, Bahia Watson, Bradley Whitford, Samira Wiley
2019 (26th)	Stranger Things	Millie Bobby Brown, Cara Buono, Jake Busey, Natalia Dyer, Cary Elwes, Priah Ferguson, Brett Gelman, David Harbour, Maya Hawke, Charlie Heaton, Andrey Ivchenko, Joe Keery, Gaten Matarazzo, Caleb McLaughlin, Dacre Montgomery, Michael Park, Francesca Reale, Winona Ryder, Noah Schnapp, Sadie Sink, Finn Wolfhard

=== 2020s ===
Year	Series	Cast members
2020 (27th)	The Crown	Gillian Anderson, Marion Bailey, Helena Bonham Carter, Stephen Boxer, Olivia Colman, Emma Corrin, Erin Doherty, Charles Edwards, Emerald Fennell, Tobias Menzies, Josh O'Connor, Sam Phillips
2020 (27th)	Better Call Saul	Jonathan Banks, Tony Dalton, Giancarlo Esposito, Patrick Fabian, Michael Mando, Bob Odenkirk, Rhea Seehorn
2020 (27th)	Bridgerton	Adjoa Andoh, Julie Andrews, Lorraine Ashbourne, Jonathan Bailey, Ruby Barker, Jason Barnett, Sabrina Bartlett, Joanna Bobin, Harriet Cains, Bessie Carter, Nicola Coughlan, Kathryn Drysdale, Phoebe Dynevor, Ruth Gemmell, Florence Hunt, Martins Imhangbe, Claudia Jessie, Jessica Madsen, Molly McGlynn, Ben Miller, Luke Newton, Julian Ovenden, Regé-Jean Page, Golda Rosheuvel, Hugh Sachs, Luke Thompson, Will Tilston, Polly Walker
2020 (27th)	Lovecraft Country	Jamie Chung, Aunjanue Ellis, Jada Harris, Abbey Lee, Jonathan Majors, Wunmi Mosaku, Jordan Patrick Smith, Jurnee Smollett, Michael Kenneth Williams
2020 (27th)	Ozark	Jason Bateman, McKinley Belcher III, Jessica Frances Dukes, Lisa Emery, Skylar Gaertner, Julia Garner, Sofia Hublitz, Kevin L. Johnson, Laura Linney, Janet McTeer, Tom Pelphrey, Joseph Sikora, Felix Solis, Charlie Tahan, Madison Thompson
2021 (28th)	Succession	Nicholas Braun, Juliana Canfield, Brian Cox, Kieran Culkin, Dagmara Domińczyk, Peter Friedman, Jihae, Justine Lupe, Matthew Macfadyen, Dasha Nekrasova, Scott Nicholson, David Rasche, Alan Ruck, J. Smith-Cameron, Sarah Snook, Fisher Stevens, Jeremy Strong, and Zoë Winters
2021 (28th)	The Handmaid's Tale	Alexis Bledel, Madeline Brewer, Amanda Brugel, Ann Dowd, O. T. Fagbenle, Joseph Fiennes, Sam Jaeger, Max Minghella, Elisabeth Moss, Yvonne Strahovski, Bradley Whitford, Samira Wiley
2021 (28th)	The Morning Show	Jennifer Aniston, Shari Belafonte, Eli Bildner, Néstor Carbonell, Steve Carell, Billy Crudup, Mark Duplass, Amber Friendly, Janina Gavankar, Valeria Golino, Tara Karsian, Hannah Leder, Greta Lee, Julianna Margulies, Joe Marinelli, Michelle Meredith, Ruairi O'Connor, Joe Pacheco, Karen Pittman, Victoria Tate, Desean Terry, Reese Witherspoon
2021 (28th)	Squid Game	Heo Sung-tae, Jun Young-soo, HoYeon Jung, Kim Joo-ryoung, Lee Byung-hun, Lee Jung-jae, O Yeong-su, Park Hae-soo, Anupam Tripathi, and Wi Ha-joon
2021 (28th)	Yellowstone	Kelsey Asbille, Wes Bentley, Ryan Bingham, Gil Birmingham, Ian Bohen, Eden Brolin, Kevin Costner, Hugh Dillon, Luke Grimes, Hassie Harrison, Cole Hauser, Jennifer Landon, Finn Little, Brecken Merrill, Will Patton, Piper Perabo, Kelly Reilly, Denim Richards, Taylor Sheridan, Forrie J. Smith, and Jefferson White
2022 (29th)	The White Lotus (Sicily)	F. Murray Abraham, Paolo Camilli, Jennifer Coolidge, Adam DiMarco, Meghann Fahy, Federico Ferrante, Bruno Gouery, Beatrice Grannò, Jon Gries, Tom Hollander, Sabrina Impacciatore, Michael Imperioli, Theo James, Aubrey Plaza, Haley Lu Richardson, Eleonora Romandini, Federico Scribani, Will Sharpe, Simona Tabasco, Leo Woodall, Francesco Zecca
2022 (29th)	Better Call Saul	Jonathan Banks, Ed Begley Jr., Tony Dalton, Giancarlo Esposito, Patrick Fabian, Bob Odenkirk, Rhea Seehorn
2022 (29th)	The Crown	Elizabeth Debicki, Claudia Harrison, Andrew Havill, Lesley Manville, Jonny Lee Miller, Flora Montgomery, James Murray, Jonathan Pryce, Ed Sayer, Imelda Staunton, Marcia Warren, Dominic West, Olivia Williams
2022 (29th)	Ozark	Jason Bateman, Nelson Bonilla, Jessica Frances Dukes, Lisa Emery, Skylar Gaertner, Julia Garner, Alfonso Herrera, Sofia Hublitz, Kevin L. Johnson, Katrina Lenk, Laura Linney, Adam Rothenberg, Felix Solls, Charlie Tahan, Richard Thomas, Damian Young
2022 (29th)	Severance	Patricia Arquette, Michael Chernus, Zach Cherry, Michael Cumpsty, Dichen Lachman, Britt Lower, Adam Scott, Tramell Tillman, Jen Tullock, John Turturro, Christopher Walken
2023 (30th)	Succession	Nicholas Braun, Juliana Canfield, Brian Cox, Kieran Culkin, Dagmara Domińczyk, Peter Friedman, Justine Lupe, Matthew Macfadyen, Arian Moayed, Scott Nicholson, David Rasche, Alan Ruck, Alexander Skarsgård, J. Smith-Cameron, Sarah Snook, Fisher Stevens, Jeremy Strong, and Zoë Winters
2023 (30th)	The Crown	Khalid Abdalla, Sebastian Blunt, Bertie Carvel, Salim Daw, Elizabeth Debicki, Luther Ford, Claudia Harrison, Lesley Manville, Ed McVey, James Murray, Jonathan Pryce, Imelda Staunton, Marcia Warren, Dominic West, and Olivia Williams
2023 (30th)	The Gilded Age	Ben Ahlers, Ashlie Atkinson, Christine Baranski, Denée Benton, Nicole Brydon Bloom, Michael Cerveris, Carrie Coon, Kelley Curran, Taissa Farmiga, David Furr, Jack Gilpin, Ward Horton, Louisa Jacobson, Simon Jones, Sullivan Jones, Celia Keenan-Bolger, Nathan Lane, Matilda Lawler, Robert Sean Leonard, Audra McDonald, Debra Monk, Donna Murphy, Kristine Nielsen, Cynthia Nixon, Kelli O'Hara, Patrick Page, Harry Richardson, Taylor Richardson, Blake Ritson, Jeremy Shamos, Douglas Sills, Morgan Spector, John Douglas Thompson, and Erin Wilhelmi
2023 (30th)	The Last of Us	Pedro Pascal and Bella Ramsey
2023 (30th)	The Morning Show	Jennifer Aniston, Nicole Beharie, Shari Belafonte, Néstor Carbonell, Billy Crudup, Mark Duplass, Jon Hamm, Theo Iyer, Hannah Leder, Greta Lee, Julianna Margulies, Tig Notaro, Karen Pittman, and Reese Witherspoon
2024 (31st)	Shōgun	Shinnosuke Abe, Tadanobu Asano, Tommy Bastow, Takehiro Hira, Moeka Hoshi, Hiromoto Ida, Cosmo Jarvis, Hiroto Kanai, Yuki Kira, Takeshi Kurokawa, Fumi Nikaido, Tokuma Nishioka, Hiroyuki Sanada, and Anna Sawai
2024 (31st)	Bridgerton	Geraldine Alexander, Victor Alli, Adjoa Andoh, Julie Andrews, Lorraine Ashbourne, Simone Ashley, Jonathan Bailey, Joe Barnes, Joanna Bobin, James Bryan, Harriet Cains, Bessie Carter, Genevieve Chenneour, Dominic Coleman, Nicola Coughlan, Kitty Devlin, Hannah Dodd, Daniel Francis, Ruth Gemmell, Rosa Hesmondhalgh, Sesley Hope, Florence Hunt, Martins Imhangbe, Molly Jackson-Shaw, Claudia Jessie, Lorn Macdonald, Jessica Madsen, Emma Naomi, Hannah New, Luke Newton, Caleb Obediah, James Phoon, Vineeta Rishi, Golda Rosheuvel, Hugh Sachs, Banita Sandhu, Luke Thompson, Will Tilston, Polly Walker, Anna Wilson-Jones, and Sophie Woolley
2024 (31st)	The Day of the Jackal	Khalid Abdalla, Jon Arias, Nick Blood, Úrsula Corberó, Charles Dance, Ben Hall, Chukwudi Iwuji, Patrick Kennedy, Puchi Lagarde, Lashana Lynch, Eleanor Matsuura, Jonjo O'Neill, Eddie Redmayne, Sule Rimi, and Lia Williams
2024 (31st)	The Diplomat	Ali Ahn, Sandy Amon-Schwartz, Tim Delap, Penny Downie, Ato Essandoh, David Gyasi, Celia Imrie, Rory Kinnear, Pearl Mackie, Nana Mensah, Graham Miller, Keri Russell, Rufus Sewell, Adam Silver, and Kenichiro Thomson
2024 (31st)	Slow Horses	Ruth Bradley, Tom Brooke, James Callis, Christopher Chung, Aimee-Ffion Edwards, Rosalind Eleazar, Sean Gilder, Kadiff Kirwan, Jack Lowden, Gary Oldman, Jonathan Pryce, Saskia Reeves, Joanna Scanlan, Kristin Scott Thomas, Hugo Weaving, Naomi Wirthner, and Tom Wozniczka
2025 (32nd)	The Pitt	Amielynn Abellera, Shabana Azeez, Patrick Ball, Isa Briones, Jalen Thomas Brooks, Taylor Dearden, Fiona Dourif, Supriya Ganesh, Joanna Going, Gerran Howell, Michael Hyatt, Tracy Ifeachor, Katherine LaNasa, Krystel V. McNeil, Brandon Mendez Homer, Alexandra Metz, Tracy Vilar, Kristin Villanueva, and Noah Wyle
2025 (32nd)	The Diplomat	Ali Ahn, Penny Downie, Rosaline Elbay, Ato Essandoh, David Gyasi, Rory Kinnear, Nana Mensah, Graham Miller, Keri Russell, and Rufus Sewell
2025 (32nd)	Landman	Paulina Chávez, Mark Collie, Sam Elliott, Colm Feore, Andy Garcia, James Jordan, Ali Larter, Jacob Lofland, Caleb Martin, Demi Moore, Michelle Randolph, Mustafa Speaks, Billy Bob Thornton, and Kayla Wallace
2025 (32nd)	Severance	Patricia Arquette, Sarah Bock, Michael Chernus, Zach Cherry, Dichen Lachman, Britt Lower, Darri Ólafsson, Adam Scott, Tramell Tillman, Jen Tullock, John Turturro, and Christopher Walken
2025 (32nd)	The White Lotus (Thailand)	Leslie Bibb, Carrie Coon, Nicholas Duvernay, Arnas Fedaravicius, Christian Friedel, Scott Glenn, Walton Goggins, Jon Gries, Dom Hetrakul, Sarah Catherine Hook, Jason Isaacs, Yuri Kolokolnikov, Julian Kostov, Charlotte Le Bon, Lalisa Manobal, Michelle Monaghan, Sam Nivola, Morgana O'Reilly, Lek Patravadi, Shalini Peiris, Parker Posey, Sam Rockwell, Natasha Rothwell, Patrick Schwarzenegger, Tayme Thapthimthong, and Aimee Lou Wood

== Multiple awards ==
4 awards

- ER (consecutive)

3 awards

- Downton Abbey (2 consecutive)

2 awards

- The Crown (consecutive)
- Boardwalk Empire (consecutive)
- Mad Men (consecutive)
- Six Feet Under (consecutive)
- The Sopranos
- Succession
- This Is Us (consecutive)
- The West Wing (consecutive)

== Multiple nominations ==
9 nominations

- Law & Order

7 nominations

- ER
- Game of Thrones
- The Sopranos

6 nominations

- The Crown
- Mad Men
- NYPD Blue
- The West Wing

5 nominations

- Boardwalk Empire
- The Closer
- Downton Abbey
- Six Feet Under

4 nominations

- Chicago Hope
- CSI: Crime Scene Investigation
- Dexter
- The Handmaid's Tale
- Homeland

3 nominations

- 24
- Better Call Saul
- Boston Legal
- Breaking Bad
- The Good Wife
- Grey's Anatomy
- Ozark
- The Practice
- Stranger Things
- The X-Files

2 nominations

- Bridgerton
- The Diplomat
- House of Cards
- The Morning Show
- Picket Fences
- Severance
- Succession
- This Is Us
- The White Lotus

== Nominations by network ==
- HBO – 34
- NBC – 24
- ABC – 16
- Netflix – 16
- CBS – 14
- AMC – 12
- Showtime – 8
- Fox – 7
- PBS – 5
- TNT – 5
- Hulu – 3
- Apple TV+ – 3
- FX – 1
- Paramount Network – 1

== See also ==
- Primetime Emmy Award for Outstanding Drama Series
- Golden Globe Award for Best Television Series – Drama
- Critics' Choice Television Award for Best Drama Series
