= IWU =

IWU is an initialism that may refer to:

- Illinois Wesleyan University
- Indiana Wesleyan University
- Independent Workers Union of Ireland
- Irish Writers' Union
