= Crooked Man =

Crooked Man may refer to:

== Fictional characters ==
- the protagonist in "The Adventure of the Crooked Man", a Sherlock Holmes short story
- a character in the nursery rhyme "There Was a Crooked Man"
- the Crooked Man, in TV series Raising Dion
- the Crooked Man, in video game The Wolf Among Us
- Crooked Man, in 2016 horror film The Conjuring 2
- Jeremiah Witkins in comic book series Hellboy: The Crooked Man and Others and film adaptation

== Film and television ==
- The Crooked Man (2003 film), starring Ross Kemp
- "The Crooked Man", a Sherlock Holmes episode
- "The Crooked Man", an episode of animated TV show Sherlock Holmes in the 22nd Century
- "The Crooked Man", an episode of TV series The Adventures of Ellery Queen

== Literature ==
- A Crooked Man, a 1995 novel by Christopher Lehmann-Haupt
- "The Crooked Man", a 1993 short story by Melinda Snodgrass in the Wild Cards anthology
- "The Crooked Man", a 1955 short story by Charles Beaumont

== Music ==
- "The Crooked Man", a song from the 2004 album Western Approaches
- "Crooked Man", a song by Show of Hands from the 2005 album As You Were

== Other uses ==
- Crooked Man, a 2011 DVD and tour by comedian Tommy Tiernan

== See also ==
- There Was a Crooked Man (disambiguation)
- Cursery: The Crooked Man and The Crooked Cat, a 2013 video game by Blue Tea Games
