= Philip Davison =

Irish novelist, screenwriter and playwright

- Born: 1957 (age 68–69); Dublin, Ireland
- Occupations: Author, screenwriter, playwright
- Writing career
- Genres: Spy fiction, fiction
- Website: www.philipdavison.com

Philip Davison (born 1957 in Dublin, Ireland) is an Irish novelist, screenwriter and playwright. He is perhaps best known for his series of spy novels which follow Harry Fielding's activities as an understrapper for the MI5. Recent publications include Eureka Dunes, published by Liberties Press in 2017, Quiet City, published in 2021, and The Makeweight, written in the 1980s but only released in 2023.

== Books ==
=== Harry Fielding novels ===
1. Crooked Man (1997)
2. McKenzie’s Friend (2000)
3. The Long Suit (2003)
4. A Burnable Town (2006)

=== Other books ===
- The Book-Thief’s Heartbeat (1981)
- Twist and Shout (1983)
- The Illustrator (1988)

== Film and drama ==
Philip Davison's play, The Invisible Mending Company (Dublin, The Abbey Theatre, Peacock Stage) was first produced in 1996. He co-scripted the film dramas Exposure and Criminal Conversation. His radio plays include Being Perfect (2004); The Duke (2004); Lennon’s Guitar (2005); and The Fishmonger (2006).

Crooked Man was adapted into a TV drama in 2003.
