= Stranded (2002 film) =

2002 American television film by Charles Beeson

- The Greatest Survivor Story of the Year
- Based on: The Swiss Family Robinson by Johann David Wyss
- Written by: Anton Diether
- Directed by: Charles Beeson
- Starring: Liam Cunningham; Brana Bajic; Roger Allam; Jesse Spencer
- Theme music composer: Stanislas Syrewicz
- Country of origin: United States
- Original language: English

Production
- Producer: Dyson Lovell
- Cinematography: Ryszard Lenczewski
- Editor: David Blackmore
- Running time: 180 minutes

Original release
- Network: Hallmark Channel
- Release: June 15, 2002

Stranded is a 2002 television adventure drama film directed by Charles Beeson, based on Johann David Wyss's 1812 novel The Swiss Family Robinson. It stars Liam Cunningham, Brana Bajic, Roger Allam and Jesse Spencer.

== Plot ==
=== Part one ===
Pastor David Robinson, falsely convicted of a crime, is exiled to a penal colony with his wife, Lara, and their four children: Ernst (17), Fritz (15), Sarah (10), and Jacob (9). During the voyage, a violent storm kills the ship’s captain, leaving first mate Thomas Blunt in command. Blunt abandons most of the crew and the Robinson family, who become trapped below deck. Jacob is separated during the chaos and swept away on a lifeboat with Blunt and crewmates Pickles and Roberts. The ship crashes onto rocks, stranding David, Lara, Ernst, Fritz, and Sarah.

The family swims to a nearby island, subsisting on coconuts and rainwater. After salvaging supplies from the wreck—including tools, weapons, livestock, and two dogs—they establish a rudimentary camp. A failed attempt to signal a passing English frigate by detonating the ship destroys remaining resources, forcing them to rely on ingenuity. They construct treehouse shelters, cultivate crops, and tame a buffalo. Sarah befriends a native boy, Namatiti, though David initially distrusts him. When Lara is bitten by a venomous snake, Namatiti aids her recovery with medicinal herbs, earning the family’s trust.

Meanwhile, Jacob, Blunt, and the surviving crew are rescued by a Malay ship. Blunt murders the captain, seizes control, and indoctrinates Jacob into piracy. Over time, Jacob grows loyal to Blunt, participating in raids against British vessels.

=== Part two ===
Seven years later, the Robinsons have transformed the island into a thriving settlement with gardens, livestock, and treehouses. Ernst (24), Fritz (22), and Sarah (18) aid their parents in maintaining their self-sufficient life. Blunt’s pirate crew, including 16-year-old Jacob, kidnaps Emily Montrose, daughter of a British captain, during a raid. Emily escapes to the island, where Ernst and Fritz rescue her. The family prepares defenses upon learning of Blunt’s impending arrival.

Blunt’s crew, seeking treasure, captures Namatiti, who leads them to a sunken ship with minimal gold. Enraged, Blunt invades the Robinsons’ home, discovering Jacob’s family alive. A tense standoff ensues, with the pirates exploiting the family’s resources. Jacob, conflicted by loyalty to Blunt and his rediscovered family, struggles to intervene.

When Lara spots a British warship, the family flees to a fortified hilltop, igniting a signal fire. A battle erupts as pirates pursue them. The Robinsons repel the attackers using explosives and rolling logs. Blunt retreats but returns for the gold, leading to a final confrontation. Namatiti kills Blunt with a spear, saving David. Jacob reconciles with his family, and Emily reunites with her father, Captain Montrose, who vows to exonerate David.

Captain Montrose offers the Robinsons passage to England. David and Lara choose to remain on the island, while Ernst departs for university. Fritz stays to help establish a trading post, marrying Emily after confessing his love. Jacob returns to the family, symbolically reuniting with Sarah through a cherished childhood doll. Namatiti bids farewell, content with the family’s peace.

== Cast ==
- Liam Cunningham as David Robinson
- Roger Allam as Thomas Blunt
- Jesse Spencer as Fritz Robinson
- Neil Newbon as Ernst Robinson
- Andrew Lee Potts as Jacob Robinson
- Charlie Lucas as Young Jacob
- Rided Lardpanna as Namatiti
- Jenna Harrison as Emily Montrose
- Emma Pierson as Sarah Robinson
- Bonnie Wright as Young Sarah
- Rupert Holliday-Evans as Roberts
- Francis Magee as Pickles

== Critical reception ==
"Do you think in this world you know so much more than Fritz, more than the native, more than the rest of us? What's happening is, this family is growing up!"
- Laura Robinson (Brana Bajic)

The film received positive reviews, with Dan Heaton of Digitally Obsessed saying, "Although I enjoyed the Disney version of Swiss Family Robinson as a small child, its one-dimensional characters quickly become tiresome as an adult. Luckily, Stranded crafts a much deeper story that should please both adults and older kids. Strong acting and well-fleshed characters make this lengthy Hallmark miniseries a worthwhile disc. If you give it a chance, this engaging tale of survival may surprise you".

Film Critic's Christopher Null gave four and a half stars (out of five) saying, "Hallmark has imbued Stranded with the appearance of big budget effects and an authenticity much like Cast Away, and though the Robinsons always had it easy compared to Hanks and Mr. Crusoe (thanks to the ship full of supplies which ran aground on the island with them), their adventure is thankfully, finally, made worth watching".
