= Liam Cunningham =

Irish actor (born 1961)

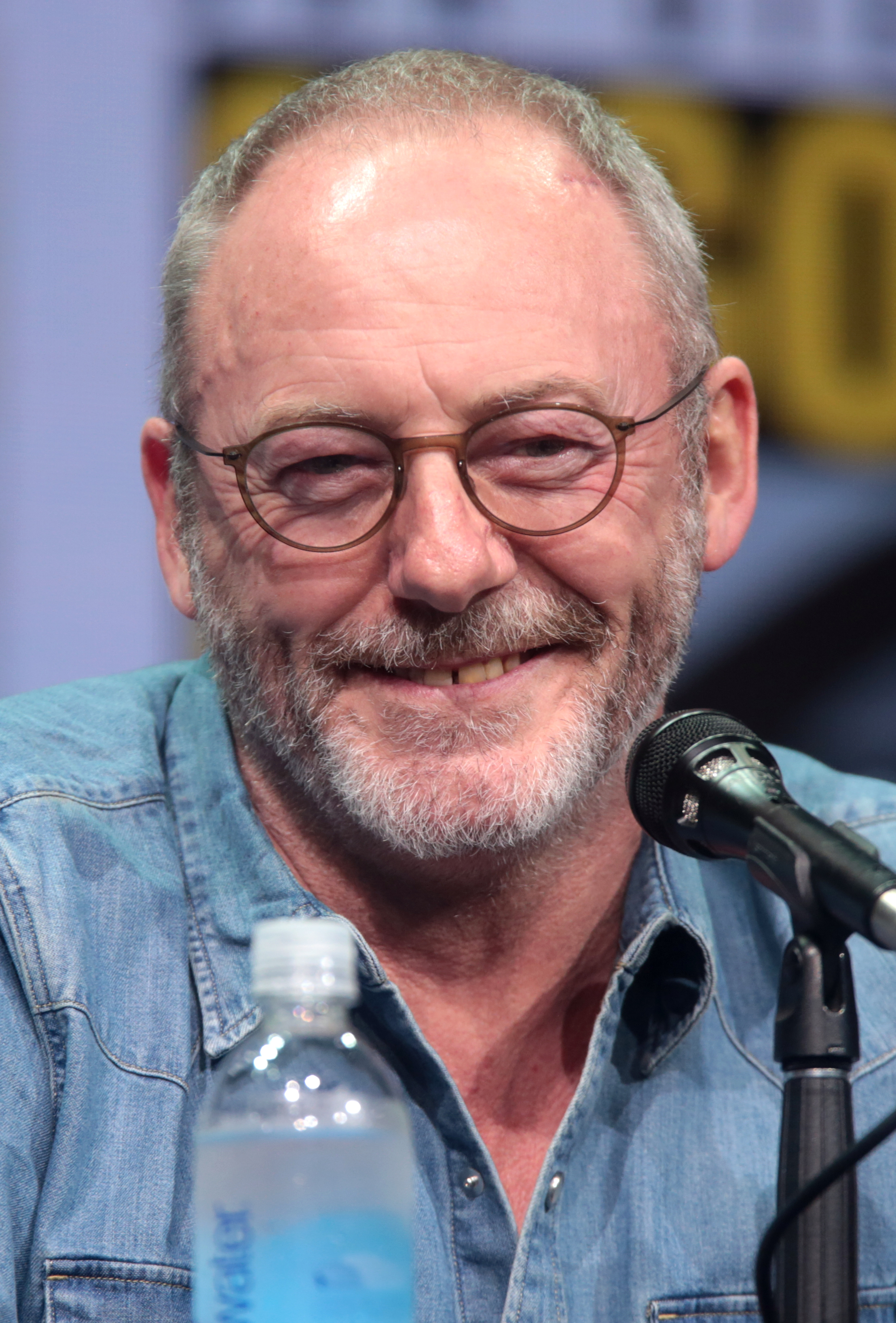
- Cunningham in 2017
- Born: 2 June 1961 (age 65); East Wall, Dublin, Ireland
- Occupation: Actor
- Years active: 1992–present
- Spouse: Colette Cunningham
- Children: 3

Liam Cunningham (born 2 June 1961) is an Irish actor. He is known for playing Davos Seaworth in the HBO epic-fantasy series Game of Thrones.

Cunningham has been nominated for the London Film Critics' Circle Award, the British Independent Film Award, has won two Irish Film & Television Awards, and shared a BAFTA with Michael Fassbender, for their crime-drama short film Pitch Black Heist. His film roles include War of the Buttons (1994), A Little Princess (1995), Jude (1996), Dog Soldiers (2002), The Crooked Man (2003), The Wind That Shakes the Barley (2006), Hunger (2008), The Escapist (2008), The Mummy: Tomb of the Dragon Emperor (2008), Good Vibrations (2013), Let Us Prey (2014) and The Childhood of a Leader (2015). In 2020, he was listed at number 36 on The Irish Times list of Ireland's greatest film actors.

== Early life ==
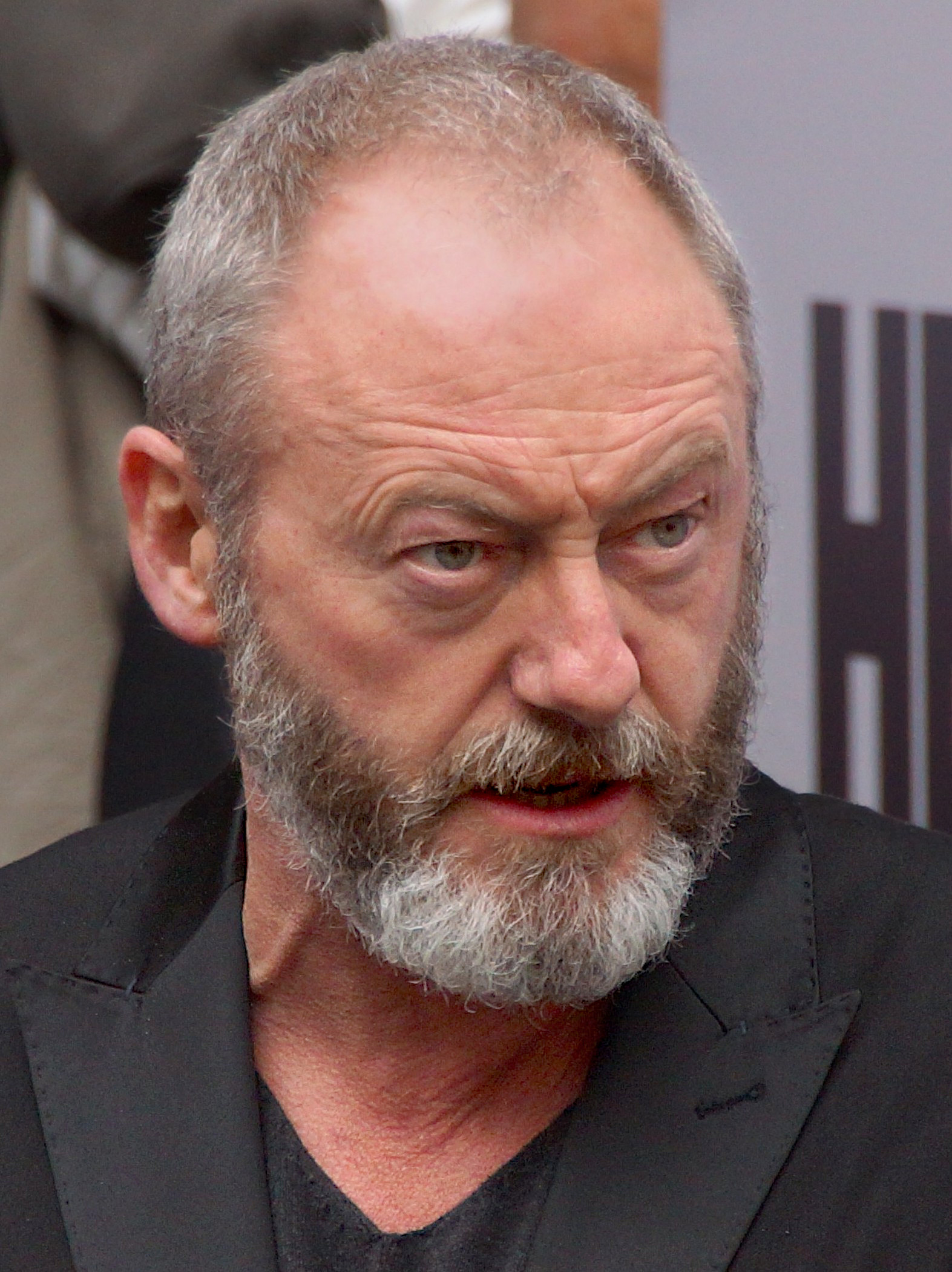
Cunningham at the Game of Thrones exhibition in May 2013

Cunningham was born in East Wall, which is an inner city area of the Northside of Dublin. He grew up in Kilmore West with his three sisters and a brother. Cunningham left secondary school at 15 and pursued a career as an electrician. In the 1980s, Cunningham moved to Zimbabwe for three years where he maintained electrical equipment at a safari park and trained Zimbabwean electricians. After returning to Ireland, Cunningham became dissatisfied with his work as an electrician and decided to pursue his interest in acting. He attended acting classes and began to work in local theatre, including the Royal Shakespeare Company. He appeared in a production of Studs at The Tricycle Theatre in Kilburn, London.

== Career ==
Cunningham's debut film role came in Into the West (1992), where he played a police officer. His on-screen acting continued with roles in War of the Buttons (1994), and A Little Princess (1995), before making his role as Phillotson in Jude (1996). He continued with character roles in Falling for a Dancer (TV, 1998), RKO 281 (1999), Shooting the Past (TV, 1999), When the Sky Falls (2000) and Stranded (2002). Cunningham came to international prominence with his role as Captain Ryan in the critically acclaimed, independent horror film, Dog Soldiers (2002).

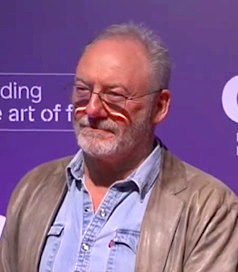
Cunningham at DIFF 2024

Cunningham starred in well-received films such as The Wind That Shakes the Barley (2006) which won the Palme d'Or at the Cannes Film Festival; Hunger; The Escapist (both 2008); The Guard; and Black Butterflies (both 2011). He also had roles in many high budget British and American films including The League of Gentlemen's Apocalypse (2005), The Mummy: Tomb of the Dragon Emperor (2008), Harry Brown (2009), Clash of the Titans, Centurion (both 2010). On television, he appeared as President Richard Tate in the BBC programme Outcasts. Cunningham was producer Philip Segal’s first choice to portray the Eighth Doctor in the TV movie of Doctor Who (1996), but was vetoed by Fox executives.

In 2012, Cunningham joined the main cast for the second season of HBO's Game of Thrones portraying former smuggler Davos Seaworth, and in 2013 he starred in The Numbers Station alongside John Cusack. He was also cast in season 5 of the BBC series Merlin as a sorcerer. He featured in the music video for "High Hopes" by Irish alternative rock band Kodaline from their EP The High Hopes. In April 2013, he appeared in the seventh series of the BBC One series Doctor Who in the episode "Cold War", where he played Captain Zhukov, the commander of a Russian submarine in 1983 facing one of the Ice Warriors. In 2015, he played the father in Brady Corbet's directorial debut film, The Childhood of a Leader.

In 2021, Cunningham voiced Man-At-Arms in the Netflix animated series Masters of the Universe: Revelation.

== Personal life ==
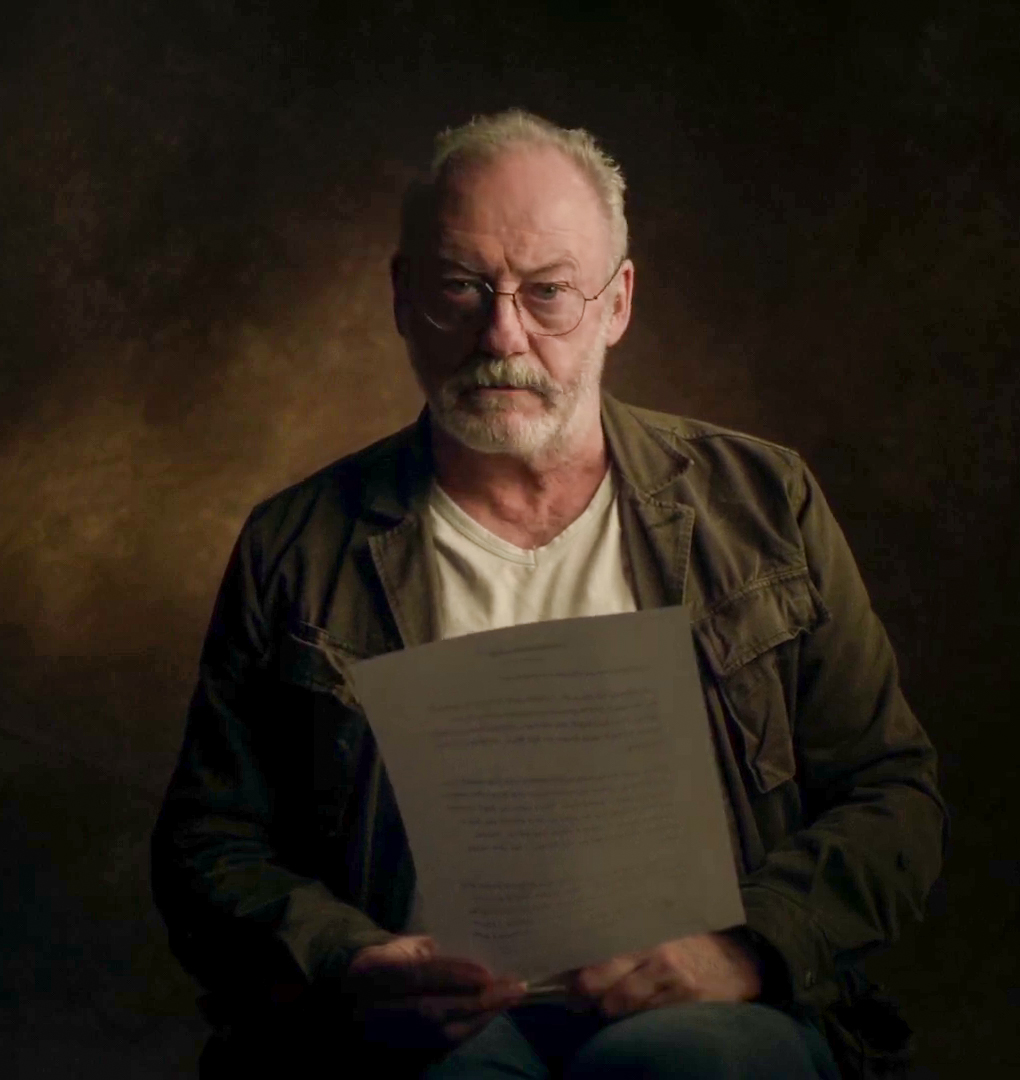
Cunningham participating in a plea to end the Gaza genocide in 2024

Cunningham lives in Dublin with his wife Colette, with whom he has three children.

== Political views and activism ==
In 2025, Cunningham expressed his belief that high-profile individuals in society have a responsibility to speak out on significant political issues. However, Cunningham also noted he felt it was the role of elected politicians to fix problems in society, not celebrities.

Cunningham is opposed to private healthcare. In 2020, he stated "I don't have private health insurance. I never have had it because nobody should. It would be very easy to start a national health system here. Just make it illegal for TDs to have private health insurance, and we'd have a fucking great health service here very quickly".

Cunningham endorsed the Trotskyist political alliance Solidarity–People Before Profit in the 2020 Irish general election.

In 2020 Cunningham criticised the Irish government's housing policy, stating "The government are a bunch of fucking idiots who can't even plan to allow young people to afford their own houses". In 2022, Cunningham joined the "Raise the Roof" campaign, led by a coalition of left-wing Irish political parties and trade unions, which called on the government to act faster on housing. In 2024, Cunningham stated he had been involved in pro-Palestinian campaigns for "30 to 40 years". In 2015, Cunningham was one of over 100 artists who signed a letter to The Guardian supporting a cultural boycott of Israel. In 2023, he was one of over two thousand to sign an Artists for Palestine letter calling for a ceasefire and accusing western governments of "not only tolerating war crimes but aiding and abetting them."

Liam Cunningham at Web Summit 2026 in Lisbon

In June 2025, several outlets erroneously reported that Cunningham had joined the June 2025 Gaza Freedom Flotilla aboard the humanitarian aid ship Madleen, which departed from Sicily en route to the Gaza Strip; however, he was not onboard. It was also in June 2025 that Cunningham appeared at a People before Profit press event and criticised the Irish Government’s approach to the Gaza conflict, arguing that economic priorities are being placed ahead of humanitarian concerns. Cunningham called for stronger action, including passing the Occupied Territories Bill with meaningful provisions, and ending trade with Israel. While at the event, Cunningham also endorsed a campaign which called on the Irish government to retain the policies of Irish neutrality and the triple lock policy for its defence forces.

In August 2025, Cunningham took part in the Global Sumud Flotilla, a civilian-led attempt to break the Israeli blockade of the Gaza Strip.

Cunningham has on multiple occasions supported campaigns of the Independent Workers Union, in August of 2023 he supported workers in a Pay dispute following a change of ownership

In May of 2026, Cunningham expressed support and joined a picket line during a strike action by Dublin healthcare assistants, demanding pay parity.

== Filmography ==
=== Film ===
Year	Title	Role	Notes
1992	Into the West	Police Officer	
1992	Public Toilet		Short film
1992	Heaven Only Knows	Paul Clarke	Short film
1993	The Sea		Short film
1994	Undercurrent	Greg Laughton	
1994	War of the Buttons	The Master	
1995	A Little Princess	Capt. Crewe / Prince Rama	
1995	First Knight	Sir Agravaine	
1996	Jude	Phillotson	
1997	The Doherty Brothers	Connor Doherty	Short film
1997	The Life of Stuff	Alex Sneddon	
1998	The Tale of Sweety Barrett	Detective Bone	
1999	A Love Divided	Sean Cloney	
2000	When the Sky Falls	John Cosgrave	
2000	The Second Death	James Mangan	Short film
2001	Revelation	Father Ray Connolly	
2001	The Island of the Mapmaker's Wife	John Wyndham	
2002	Dog Soldiers	Capt. Ryan	
2002	The Abduction Club	John Power	
2003	Mystics	Sean Foley	
2003	The Crooked Man	Hamilton	
2003	The League of Gentlemen's Apocalypse	Director	
2004	The Card Player	John Brennan	
2004	Screwback	Harry	Short film
2005	Breakfast on Pluto	1st Biker	
2006	The Wind That Shakes the Barley	Dan	
2008	The Escapist	Brodie	
2008	Hunger	Father Dominic Moran	
2008	Paris Noir	Douglas	
2008	The Mummy: Tomb of the Dragon Emperor	Mad Dog Maguire	
2009	Blood: The Last Vampire	Michael Harrison	
2009	The Tournament	Powers	
2009	Perrier's Bounty	The Mutt	
2009	Harry Brown	Sid Rourke	
2010	Centurion	Brick	
2010	Clash of the Titans	Solon	
2010	The Whistleblower	Bill Hynes	
2011	Pitch Black Heist	Liam	Short film Also executive producer
2011	The Guard	Francis Sheehy-Skeffington	
2011	Black Butterflies	Jack Cope	
2011	The Silence of Joan	The English Captain	
2011	War Horse	The Army Doctor	
2012	Safe House	Alec Wade	
2013	SLR	Elliot	Short film
2013	The Numbers Station	Grey	
2013	Good Vibrations	Davy	
2014	I Am Here	Father	Short film
2014	Noble	Thomas	
2014	Let Us Prey	Six	
2015	Ladygrey	Angus	
2015	Dusha shpiona	Hillsman	
2015	The Childhood of a Leader	The Father	
2015	Pursuit	Fionn	
2017	24 Hours to Live	Wetzler	
2021	The Vault	Walter Moreland	
2023	The Last Voyage of the Demeter	Captain Elliot	
2025	Palestine 36	Charles Tegart	

=== Television ===
Year	Title	Role	Notes
1993	A Handful of Stars	Stapler	TV movie
1993	Poor Beast in the Rain	Danger Doyle	TV movie
1994–1995	Roughnecks	Chris	13 episodes
1995	Cracker	Stuart Grady	2 episodes
1997	Police 2020	DCI Billy O'Connell	Pilot
1998	Falling for a Dancer	Mossie Sheehan	TV movie
1999	Shooting the Past	Christopher Anderson	Miniseries
1999	Too Rich: The Secret Life of Doris Duke	Alec Cunningham-Reid	TV movie
1999	RKO 281	Gregg Toland	TV movie
2000	A Likeness in Stone	Bill Armstrong	TV movie
2001	Rebel Heart	Michael Malone	TV movie
2001	Attila	Theodoric I	2 episodes
2002	Stranded	David Robinson	TV movie
2003	Final Demand	David Milner	TV movie
2003	Prime Suspect	Robert West	Episode: "Part 1"
2004	Messiah	Pace Tierney	Episode: "The Promise"
2005	Showbands	Tony Golden	TV movie
2005	The Clinic	Malcolm Keown	5 episodes
2006	Hotel Babylon	Adrian McBride	Episode #1.8
2006	Showbands II	Tony Golden	TV movie
2006	Murphy's Law	Drew Johnstone	3 episodes
2007	Afterlife	Jonathan	Episode: "Your Hand in Mine"
2007	The Wild West	Wyatt Earp	Episode: "The Gunfight at the OK Corral"
2007	Northanger Abbey	General Tilney	TV movie
2007	Anner House	Neil Barry	
2007	The Catherine Tate Show	Father	Episode: "Christmas Special"
2009	The Street	Thomas Miller	Episode #3.1
2011	Outcasts	President Richard Tate	8 episodes
2011	Camelot	Colfur	Episode: "Justice"
2011	Strike Back: Project Dawn	Daniel Connolly	2 episodes
2012	Saving the Titanic	Narrator (voice)	Documentary
2012	Titanic: Blood and Steel	Jim Larkin	5 episodes
2012	Merlin	Ruadan	2 episodes
2012–2019	Game of Thrones	Davos Seaworth	42 episodes
2013	Doctor Who	Captain Zhukov	Episode: "Cold War"
2013	Vera	Sam Harper	Episode: "Prodigal Son"
2015	The Musketeers	Belgard	Episode: "The Prodigal Father"
2017	Philip K. Dick's Electric Dreams	General Olin	Episode: "Human Is"
2019	The Hot Zone	Wade Carter	6 episodes
2019	Rick and Morty	Balthromaw (voice)	Episode: “Claw and Hoarder: Special Ricktim's Morty”
2020	Solar Opposites	Pupa (voice)	Episode: "Retrace-Your-Step-Alizer"
2021	Domina	Livius	8 episodes
2021–2024	Masters of the Universe	Man-At-Arms (voice)	13 episodes
2024–present	3 Body Problem	Thomas Wade	8 episodes

=== Music video appearances ===
Year	Title	Artist
2013	"High Hopes"	Kodaline
2026	Irish Goodbye	Kneecap

=== Video game ===
Year	Title	Role	Notes
2026	Squadron 42	Captain Noah White	Motion capture in 2015

== Awards and nominations ==
Year	Film/Television	Award	Result
1999	Falling for a Dancer	Irish Film and Television Award for Best Actor in a Lead Television Role	Nominated
1999	A Love Divided	Irish Film and Television Award for Best Male Actor in a Lead Film Role	Nominated
2006	Showbands II	Irish Film and Television Award for Best Actor in a Lead Role in Television	Nominated
2006	Murphy's Law	Irish Film and Television Award for Best Actor in a Supporting Role in Television	Nominated
2006	The Wind That Shakes the Barley	Irish Film and Television Award for Best Supporting Actor in a Film	Won
2008	Hunger	London Film Critics' Circle Award for Best Supporting Actor of the Year	Nominated
2008	Hunger	Irish Film and Television Award for Best Supporting Actor in a Film	Won
2008	Hunger	British Independent Film Award for Best Supporting Actor in a Film	Nominated
2012	Pitch Black Heist	BAFTA Award for Best Short Film	Won
2012	The Guard	Irish Film and Television Award for Best Supporting Actor in a Film	Nominated
2014	Game of Thrones	Irish Film and Television Award for Best Actor in a Supporting Role – Drama	Nominated
2015	Game of Thrones	Irish Film and Television Award for Best Actor in a Supporting Role – Drama	Nominated
2016	Game of Thrones	Irish Film and Television Award for Best Actor in a Supporting Role – Drama	Nominated
2017	Game of Thrones	Screen Actors Guild Award for Outstanding Performance by an Ensemble in a Drama Series	Nominated
2017	Game of Thrones	Irish Film and Television Award for Best Actor in a Supporting Role – Drama	Nominated
