= Falling for a Dancer =

- Based on: Falling for a Dancer by Deirdre Purcell
- Screenplay by: Deirdre Purcell
- Directed by: Richard Standeven
- Starring: Elisabeth Dermot Walsh
- Theme music composer: Stephen McKeon
- Country of origin: Ireland
- Original language: English
- No. of episodes: 4

Production
- Producer: Peter Norris
- Editor: Richard Milward
- Running time: 200 minutes

Original release
- Network: BBC One
- Release: 13 September – 4 October 1998

Falling for a Dancer is an Irish 1998 romantic drama television movie set in rural Ireland in the 1930s. It first aired on BBC One in four 50-minute episodes on 13 September 1998.

== Plot ==
Set in 1930s Cork, nineteen-year-old Elizabeth has a brief fling with a young actor and dancer and becomes pregnant. With no chance of finding the father, and trying to avoid entering the Magdalene Laundries, she chooses to marry an older man who she first meets on her wedding day and moves to her new life in West Cork. The series follows Elizabeth through this marriage and her new life on a farm in West Cork. It is here Elizabeth has her baby but her choice of marriage has its darker side; resentment from her step children, moments of tragedy and a longing for young love and passion that she does not get from her husband, Neeley.

== Production ==
It was filmed in Beara, County Cork on the southwest coast.

== Cast ==
- Elisabeth Dermot Walsh as Elizabeth
- Dermot Crowley as Neeley Scollard
- Liam Cunningham as Mossie Sheehan
- Rory Murray as George
- Maureen O'Brien as Corinne Sullivan
- Brian McGrath as St. John Sullivan
- Colin Farrell as Daniel McCarthey
