= There Was a Crooked Man (disambiguation) =

"There Was a Crooked Man" is a nursery rhyme.

There Was a Crooked Man may also refer to:

- "There Was A Crooked Man", a 1950 episode of Westinghouse Studio One
- There Was a Crooked Man (1960 film), featuring Norman Wisdom
- There Was a Crooked Man... (1970 film) a western film starring Kirk Douglas and Henry Fonda
- There was a Crooked Man: the Poems of Lex Banning, a 1984 collection by Lex Banning

== See also ==
- "There Is a Crooked Man", a Jack Wodhams short story
- Crooked Man (disambiguation)
