= Phony (TV series) =

American television series

- Genre: Comedy; Mystery
- Created by: Nick Paley
- Starring: Connie Britton; Sam Nivola; Grace Brennan; Maliq Johnson; Meera Syal; Colter Lee; Mahaela Park
- Music by: Christopher Bear
- Country of origin: United States
- Original language: English
- No. of seasons: 1
- No. of episodes: 6

Production
- Executive producers: Nick Paley; Anthony King; Charlie Alderman; Drew Goddard; Sarah Esberg; Connie Britton
- Producers: Arielle Boisvert; Holly Redford
- Cinematography: Andy Rydzewski; Michael Wale
- Editors: Nick Paley; Sascha Stanton-Craven; Jon Philpot; Cori Wapnowska
- Running time: 27–37 minutes
- Production companies: Goddard Textiles; Delby Films; Charlie's Production Company; Young Monk Productions; 20th Television

Original release
- Network: Hulu
- Release: October 20, 2026 – present

Phony is an American comedy mystery television series created by Nick Paley. It stars Connie Britton and Sam Nivola. Following the production of a pilot episode, Hulu ordered the series in 2025. The series premiered on Hulu on October 20, 2026.

== Premise ==
Phony is a coming-of-age mystery series about a teenager who wakes up in the hospital after a car accident and discovers that his mother, his only parent and best friend, appears to have been replaced by an impostor.

== Cast ==
=== Main ===
- Connie Britton as Ellen Cooke
- Sam Nivola as Sonny Cooke
- Grace Brennan as Mallory Russell
- Maliq Johnson as Vogel
- Meera Syal as Sharla
- Colter Lee as Weldon
- Mahaela Park as Chloe

=== Recurring ===
- Spencer Driver as young Sonny

== Episodes ==
No.	Title	Directed by	Written by	Original release date
1	"Pilot"	Nick Paley	Nick Paley	October 20, 2026
2	"Crosby, Stills, and Nash"	Nick Paley	Nick Paley	October 20, 2026
3	"Reverse Cuckoo Situation"	Tazbah Chavez	Michelle Badillo	October 27, 2026
4	"Vibes Are Rancid"	Tazbah Chavez	Lacey Jeka	November 3, 2026
5	"House of Dog"	Nicole Holofcener	Ali Liebegott	November 10, 2026
6	"I'm Right Here"	Nicole Holofcener	Dave Harris	November 17, 2026
7	"What Comes Up?"	TBA	Vera Santamaria	November 24, 2026
8	"You've Got a Good Life"	TBA	Anthony King	December 1, 2026

== Production ==
=== Development ===
The comedy mystery series is produced by 20th Television and is created by Nick Paley. Paley wrote and directed the pilot of the series. He is also an executive producer alongside co-showrunner Anthony King, Connie Britton, Charlie Alderman, Drew Goddard and Sarah Esberg. It had originally been set up at ABC Signature in 2022, before the studio was folded into 20th Television. After a successful pilot episode in 2024, it received a series order from Hulu in August 2025.

=== Casting ===
The series' regular cast includes Connie Britton, Sam Nivola, Meera Syal, Grace Brennan, Mahaela Park, Maliq Johnson, and Colter Lee.

== Release ==
The trailer was released by Hulu on September 29, 2026. The first two episodes of Phony premiered on Hulu and Disney+ on October 20, with subsequent episodes released weekly on Tuesdays at 3 a.m. ET (12 a.m. PT) on Hulu and through the Hulu hub on Disney+.

== Reception ==
Phony ranked No. 8 on Hulu's "Top 15 Today" list—a daily updated list of the platform's most-watched titles—following its premiere on October 20. The series remained on Hulu's "Top 15 Today" list from its premiere on October 20 through November 12.

On the review aggregator website Rotten Tomatoes, the series holds an approval rating of 94%, based on 16 reviews, with an average of rated reviews of 8.1/10. The website's critics consensus reads, "Phony twists the coming-of-age genre into a smart mystery with standout performances." Metacritic, which uses a weighted average, assigned a score of 78 out of 100 based on 11 critics, indicating "generally favorable" reviews.
