= The Crooked Man (2003 film) =

- Genre: Thriller
- Based on: The Crooked Man by Philip Davison
- Written by: Shaun McKenna
- Directed by: David Drury
- Starring: Ross Kemp; Liam Cunningham; Natasha Little; Michael Byrne; Rupert Frazer; Alan McKenna
- Composer: Alan Parker
- Country of origin: United Kingdom
- Original language: English
- No. of episodes: 1

Production
- Executive producers: David Drury; Louise Foster; Ralph Camp; Jim Reeve
- Producer: Elli Jason
- Cinematography: Dominic Clemence
- Editor: Lucy Smith
- Camera setup: John Bailie
- Running time: 120 minutes
- Production companies: Carlton Television; Strand Productions

Original release
- Network: ITV
- Release: 17 December 2003

The Crooked Man is a British crime drama film, written by Shaun McKenna and directed by David Drury, that first broadcast on ITV on 17 December 2003. The film stars Ross Kemp as Harry Fielding, an investigative reporter and government spy who becomes embroiled in a twisted case of murder and blackmail involving his bosses Hamilton and Saunders.

The film itself based upon the novel of the same name by Philip Davison, and was commissioned as part of ITV's Christmas Drama slate for 2003. Against stiff competition, the film gathered 5.66m viewers on its debut broadcast. The film was released on Region 2 DVD via Studio Canal in 2004, exclusively in the Netherlands.

== Plot ==
Harry Fielding is an investigative reporter working for a secret agency designed to covertly document the compromising activities of important public figures. His latest task is to investigate member of parliament Douglas Jenner, who has reportedly been cheating on his wife with a mistress, Angela Richardson. Meanwhile, Harry finds he has a new neighbour – primary school teacher Lisa Talbot, whose daughter, Sarah, is being tormented by an abusive boyfriend, Joe.

At the request of his boss, Hamilton, Harry takes covert photos of Angela rowing with her ex, Alex Simpson, and follows Angela as she goes to meet with Jenner. However, he spots Lisa driving erratically, and out of intrigue, follows her to what turns out to be Joe's house. Harry sits in wait as an argument between Sarah and Joe ends in tragedy, with Lisa accidentally causing Joe's death by pushing him down the stairs. Harry follows Lisa into the woods as she attempts to bury Joe's body, but early the next day, he informs her that he knows all about the events of the night before, and that they need to return to the woods to bury the body deeper. Lisa questions why Harry would be willing to help her; and he tells her that he is not fazed by anything.

Meanwhile, a dog walker in the woods finds Joe's body, and a subsequent police investigation leads to Harry and Lisa being arrested, after a witness claims to have spotted Harry's car following Lisa on the night of the murder. Harry and Lisa are both later released without charge on the orders of Hamilton. Harry tells Lisa to keep quiet to avoid further incrimination. Meanwhile, Harry approaches a friend, Jimmy Mo, and asks him if he can park his car at the back of his restaurant while he continues his surveillance on Jenner. Jimmy agrees, but in return, Harry has to babysit his teenage daughter, Mei Ling, while he attends an important meeting. Mei Ling becomes interested in Harry's line of work, but Harry kindly asks her to mind her own business.

Later that night, while keeping surveillance on Jenner, Harry witnesses Jenner stab Angela during a heated argument. In order to blackmail Jenner, Harry approaches him and says that he will dispose of the body. He and Hamilton come and remove Angela's body from her flat, and fully clean the scene in order to remove any incriminating evidence. Harry and Hamilton take the body to a local crematorium, and Hamilton performs a midnight cremation, unaware that Mei Ling has been hiding in Harry's car the whole time, and has witnessed the whole event - as well as taking incriminating photos on her camera. When Harry discovers that Mei Ling has been following him, he offers her money to hand over her camera.

Harry soon comes to realise that Hamilton is working for a secret agenda, and that Lisa is in fact a colleague who has been ordered to keep tabs on Harry by Archie Saunders, the head of his organisation. Harry meets with Saunders, who confirms that Jenner will be protected from the public eye for the time being, but that the evidence will be kept on file and eventually revealed further down the line.

== Cast ==
- Ross Kemp as Harry Fielding
- Liam Cunningham as Hamilton
- Natasha Little as Lisa Talbot
- Michael Byrne as Archie Saunders
- Rupert Frazer as Douglas Jenner
- Alan McKenna as Alex Simpson
- Jake Wood as George
- Karen Wallace-Jones as Sarah Miller
- Simon Meacock as Joe Miller
- Hannah Ho as Mei Ling
- Hi Ching as Jimmy Mo
- Marina Morgan as Angela Richardson
- Wendy Kweh as Ji
