= Independent Workers Union of Ireland =

Trade union

- Founded: 2003
- Headquarters: Cork, Ireland
- Location: Ireland
- Key people: Cristina Diamant (President); Jamie Murphy (National Secretary)
- Website: www.union.ie

The Independent Workers Union of Ireland (IWU) is a trade union in Ireland with its headquarters in Cork City. It was formed by Irish workers dissatisfied with the trade union movement in Ireland which it states, has "become nothing more than an arm of the state and management." It has over 1,000 paying members organised in 7 Branches in Ireland and is affiliated to the ideals of early Irish trade unionists such as James Connolly and Jim Larkin. It is not affiliated to the main Trade Union Umbrella body the ICTU.

== Campaigns ==
The IWU and its members campaigned against the Treaty of Lisbon and continue to campaign vigorously against austerity measures.

=== Iceland ===
In 2023, IWU was involved in a protracted industrial dispute with Metron Stores Ltd, the Irish franchisee of Iceland Foods. In January 2023, the Republic of Ireland branch of Iceland Foods UK transferred its operations to Metron Stores Ltd, and over the following months, a series of payroll issues developed that led to workers going unpaid. This, in the context of doubt and uncertainty about the brand's future, and a number of other grievances related to governance, pay and conditions, led to widespread dissatisfaction among the employees. In May, the IWU successfully balloted its members at a number of Iceland stores in Dublin for industrial action, with strike action taking place the following week.

After a series of further developments, including a product recall by the FSAI, Metron Stores sought the protection of the courts and entered examinership in May. A number of stores were closed throughout the country with many workers being placed on temporary lay-off. In response, workers occupied several stores with the support of the IWU in a widely publicised national dispute lasting for over 90 days. The IWU continued to negotiate with the examiner demanding the reimbursement of the workers for all outstanding payments, including redundancy payments. In September 2023, Metron Stores entered liquidation and all of the remaining stores in the Republic of Ireland were closed.

The IWU's industrial campaign was supported by actor Liam Cunningham. A number of politicians raised concerns and queries in Dáil Éireann, including criticisms of the government for failing to intervene in the situation. The President of the IWU, Cristina Diamant, articulated a number of political demands as part of its campaign, including calls for increased funding for WRC inspections of working conditions, as well as new regulations to prevent strategic bankruptcy from being utilised to the expense of workers.
