= Tayme Thapthimthong =

British actor

- เมธี ทับทิมทอง
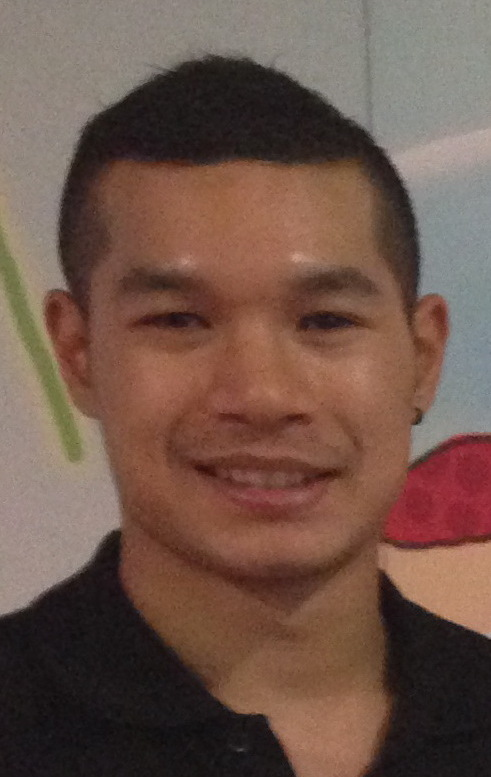
- Thapthimthong in 2015
- Born: 1989 or 1990 (age 36–37); London, England, United Kingdom
- Other name: Maethi Thapthimthong
- Education: Kingston University
- Occupation: Actor
- Notable work: The White Lotus
- Children: 1
- Military career
- Allegiance: Thailand
- Branch: Royal Thai Army

Tayme Thapthimthong (born 1989 or 1990), also known as Maethi Thapthimthong (Thai: เมธี ทับทิมทอง), is an English-Thai actor. He is best known for his role as Gaitok in the third season of HBO series The White Lotus (2025), which earned his nomination in Actor Awards for Outstanding Performance by an Ensemble in a Drama Series in 2026.

== Early life and education ==
Thapthimthong was born in West London, England. His parents were from Thailand and ran a successful restaurant in Kensington. He has a younger brother.

At age 13, Thapthimthong joined Combined Cadet Force, a youth training program run by the British Armed Forces. He became interested in joining the military, but his parents wanted him to get a university degree, so he studied dance at Kingston University.

== Career ==
While at university, Thapthimthong worked as a nightclub bouncer. Still determined to join the military as a Royal Marine, he trained with a family friend who had been in the Special Air Service, but did not qualify for medical reasons.

After this disappointment, his parents encouraged him to move to Thailand to live with his aunt and uncle. There, Thapthimthong worked briefly for two months as a hotel service manager. He then auditioned and was cast in the reality show and singing contest Academy Fantasia (2013), finishing as runner-up and landing a record deal. Within a month, he landed his first acting role as Nung in the film Skin Trade (2014).

After five years of minor roles in productions such as Farang (2017) and the Netflix series Thai Cave Rescue (2022), Thapthimthong reevaluated his career choices. Around the same time, he received his Thai military conscription papers, and decided to join the Royal Thai Army. He served for six months as a conscript, being assigned to the Counter Terrorist Operations Center, before joining as an officer. He worked for the army's counter-terrorism team and spent time with the Armed Forces Security Centre, the Thai counterpart of MI6 or the CIA.

Three years later, Thapthimthong left the military for more lucrative work at private security companies. As recently as January 2024, he did security for Thai-American hip-hop group Thaitanium.

Thapthimthong was still working security when he was cast as Gaitok in season three of the HBO series The White Lotus, which is set in Thailand. He credits castmate Lisa with helping him improve his Thai accent.

Thapthimthong had a small role as Anant, a security guard, in Alien: Earth (2025), which was filmed in Thailand. According to series showrunner Noah Hawley, Thapthimthong filmed most of his scenes before the 2023 SAG-AFTRA strike shut down production, and by the time be returned to finish filming, he had been cast in The White Lotus in a much bigger role — with a different hairstyle — requiring him to wear a helmet for his remaining Alien: Earth scenes to maintain continuity.

== Personal life ==
Thapthimthong has a daughter.

== Filmography ==
=== Film ===
Year	Title	Role	Notes
2014	Skin Trade	Nung	Credited as Tayme
2016	Mechanic: Resurrection	Young Construction Worker	Credited as Maethi Thapthimthong
2017	Paradox	Thai Police	Credited as Maethi Thapthimthong
2019	The White Storm 2: Drug Lords	Indonesian Police Chief	Credited as Maethi Thapthimthong
2026	The Devil's Mouth	Wat	
2026	Mutiny (2026 film)	Detective	
2027	John Rambo		Post-production
2027	Blood and Dust		Post-production

=== Television ===
Year	Title	Role	Notes	Source
2013	Academy Fantasia	Himself	12 episodes	
2017	Farang	Pao	7 episodes	
2018	Hooked	Lamon	2 episodes	
2020	Bäckström	Prasong	Episode: “Avsnitt 3”	
2022	Thai Cave Rescue	Abbot	Episode: “To Not Offend the Gods”	
2025	The White Lotus	Gaitok	Main role; Season 3	
2025	Alien: Earth	Anant	2 episodes	
