= Sam Nivola =

British and American actor (born 2003)

- Born: Samuel John Nivola; September 26, 2003 (age 23); London, England
- Citizenship: United Kingdom; United States
- Education: Columbia University
- Occupation: Actor
- Years active: 2013–present
- Partner: Iris Apatow (2024–present)
- Parents: Emily Mortimer (mother); Alessandro Nivola (father)
- Relatives: John Mortimer (maternal grandfather); Costantino Nivola (paternal great-grandfather)

Samuel John Nivola (born September 26, 2003) is a British and American actor. He is the son of actors Emily Mortimer and Alessandro Nivola. His credits include the films White Noise (2022) and Eileen (2023), as well as the Netflix series The Perfect Couple (2024) and season three of the HBO anthology series The White Lotus (2025).

== Early life and education ==
Nivola was born at the Portland Hospital in central London to British actress Emily Mortimer and American actor Alessandro Nivola. He has Italian and German-Jewish ancestry on his father's side. His maternal grandfather is the dramatist Sir John Mortimer. His paternal great-grandfather is the sculptor Costantino Nivola.

He has a younger sister, May, who also acts. Nivola spent his early childhood in the Echo Park neighborhood of Los Angeles, Notting Hill and then grew up in the New York City neighborhood of Boerum Hill. He attended Saint Ann's School and then Columbia University.

== Career ==
Nivola made his acting debut in the Sky Atlantic comedy series Doll & Em (2013), starring his mother. In 2021, he and his sister played siblings on an episode of The Pursuit of Love, a British miniseries based on Nancy Mitford's novel of the same title adapted by their mother for BBC One. Nivola wrote and directed a short film, Neighborhood Watch, for the anthology With/In (2021), which consisted of films shot on smartphones about life in quarantine during the COVID-19 pandemic.

Nivola and his sister played two of the central family's children in Noah Baumbach's film White Noise (2022). At the callback audition for White Noise, Baumbach asked Nivola whether his sister wanted to audition for the role she plays in the film. The next year, Nivola played Leonard Bernstein's son in Bradley Cooper's Maestro. Also in 2023, Nivola walked the runway at Paris Fashion Week for Miu Miu alongside the likes of Emma Corrin.

In 2024, Nivola starred in The Perfect Couple. In 2025, he starred in season three of The White Lotus. In March 2025, he began filming the Bobby Farrelly comedy film Driver's Ed. Later that year, a pilot Phony he filmed with Connie Britton received a series order from Hulu.

== Personal life ==
Nivola has been in a relationship with Iris Apatow since 2024. She visited him on the set of The White Lotus. They live together in an apartment in New York.

== Filmography ==
=== Film ===
Year(s)	Title	Role	Notes
2014	River of Fundament	Kidsroom Ensemble	
2021	Neighborhood Watch (in With/In)		Short film; also writer and director
2022	White Noise	Heinrich	
2023	Eileen	Lee Polk	
2023	Maestro	Alexander Bernstein	
2025	Driver's Ed	Jeremy	

=== Television ===
Year(s)	Title	Role	Notes
2013	Doll & Em	Ariel	Episode: "Six"
2021	The Pursuit of Love	Matt	Episode: "Episode Two"
2024	The Perfect Couple	Will Winbury	Main role; season 1
2025	The White Lotus	Lochlan Ratliff	Main role; season 3
2026	Phony	Sonny Cooke	Main role

== Awards and nominations ==
Organizations	Year (Note: Indicates the year of the ceremony.)	Category	Work	Result	Ref(s)
Actor Awards	2026	Outstanding Performance by an Ensemble in a Drama Series	The White Lotus	Nominated (Note: Shared with the cast.)	
