= Patravadi Mejudhon =

Thai actress and teacher of dramatic arts

- ภัทราวดี มีชูธน
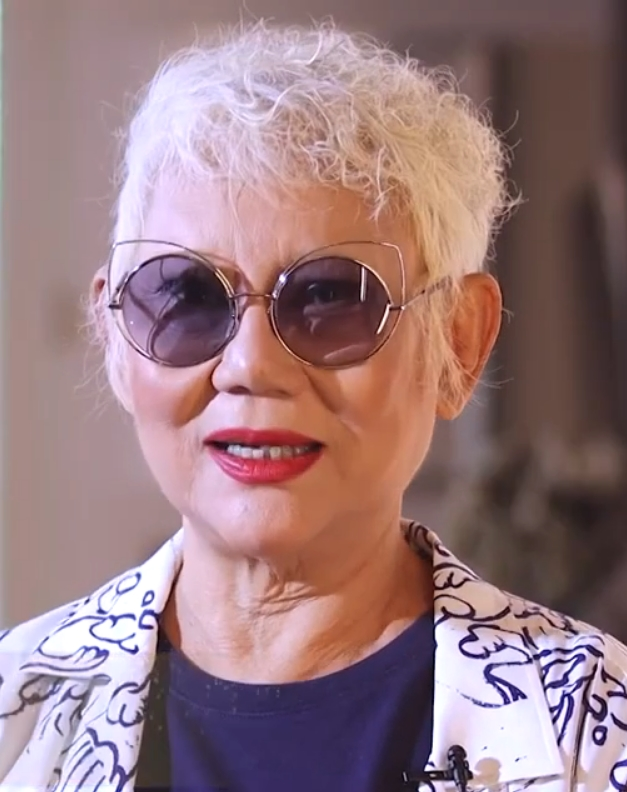
- Patravadi in 2020
- Born: May 27, 1948 (age 78); Thailand
- Occupations: Actress; playwright; producer; teacher
- Years active: 1973–present

Patravadi Mejudhon (Thai: ภัทราวดี มีชูธน; RTGS: Phattharawadi Michuthon, born 27 May 1948), nicknamed Lek, is a Thai actress, playwright, television director/producer and teacher of dramatic arts. She is known for her acting career, television productions, as well as the stage production company and school based at her Patravadi Theatre. She was named National Artist in performing arts in 2015.

Patravadi first came to be known by Western audiences in the third season of The White Lotus, in which she stars as the co-owner of a Thailand resort in the fictional hotel chain.

== Early life ==
Patravadi grew up in Soi Wat Rakhang and studied at Rajini School. She liked dancing and drama. When she was 12 years old, she went to study in England and then traveled to America to study acting. Patravadi is the daughter of Sa-at Meechuthan, former Director-General of the Department of Industrial Works, and Khunying Supatra Singhalaka, owner and operator of the ferry company and the Chao Phraya Express Boat. Therefore, her theatre business was located on her mother's land on the banks of the Chao Phraya river, in the same alley as Wat Rakhang, where the Supatra Boat Co, Ltd, the Chao Phraya Express Boat service provider, is located. It was active from 1992 to 2014. She has an older sister named Supaphan Pichairanarongsongkhram (married to Pao Pichairanarongsongkhram). She is the granddaughter of Phraya Ratchamontri (Song Singhalaka) and Khunying Boonpun Thepsombat, the maid of Princess Dara Rasmi, the royal consort of King Chulalongkorn.

== Career ==
In 1973, she entered the film industry by co-starring in the film Mai Mee Sawan Khun Khun (ไม่มีสวรรค์สำหรับคุณ) and received a Golden Doll award from this film. After that, she continued to act in films and dramas, using the stage name 'Phatravadi Sritrairat', which was successful and she used this name until she got married.

From 1977 to 1980, she was a television drama producer, writer, director, and co-starred in short television dramas for Channel 3, such as Chit Mai Wang (จิตไม่ว่าง), Tukkata Siakban (ตุ๊กตาเสียกบาล), Black Coral Sea (ปะการังสีดำ), etc. In 1983, she created television dramas for Channel 9. In 1984, she created stage plays for Night Spot Company and was a consultant for the establishment of Montien Thong Theatre, which led to the establishment of the Phatravadee Theatre and Dance Company in 1987.

Currently, she is the director and acting teacher of the Phatravadee Theatre, and she also devotes her time to teaching and lecturing in performing arts at Phatrawadi Secondary School, Hua Hin Phatrawadi Mechuthan was honored as a National Artist in Performing Arts in 2014.
