= Hide or Seek =

- The White Lotus episode
- Episode no.: Season 3 Episode 4
- Directed by: Mike White
- Written by: Mike White
- Cinematography by: Ben Kutchins
- Editing by: Scott Turner
- Original air date: March 9, 2025
- Running time: 60 minutes

Guest appearances
- Arnas Fedaravicius as Valentin; Christian Friedel as Fabian; Dom Hetrakul as Pornchai; Yuri Kolokolnikov as Vlad; Julian Kostov as Aleksei; Charlotte Le Bon as Chloe; Morgana O'Reilly as Pam; Shalini Peiris as Amrita

Episode chronology
← Previous "The Meaning of Dreams"	Next → "Full-Moon Party"
- The White Lotus season 3

"Hide or Seek" is the fourth episode of the third season of the American black comedy drama anthology television series The White Lotus. It is the seventeenth overall episode of the series and was written and directed by series creator Mike White. It originally aired on HBO on March 9, 2025, and also was available on Max on the same date.

The series follows the guests and employees of the fictional White Lotus resort chain. The season is set in Thailand, and follows the new guests, which include Rick Hatchett and his younger girlfriend Chelsea; Timothy Ratliff, his wife Victoria, and their children Saxon, Piper, and Lochlan; Jaclyn Lemon and her friends Kate and Laurie; and White Lotus Hawaii employee Belinda. In the episode, Rick, Chelsea and the Ratliffs attend a yacht party hosted by Chloe and "Gary", while Jaclyn, Kate and Laurie decide to deviate from their routine.

According to Nielsen Media Research, the episode was seen by an estimated 0.677 million household viewers and gained a 0.16 ratings share among adults aged 18–49. The episode received mostly positive reviews from critics, who praised the performances (particularly Jason Isaacs), tension, character development and cliffhanger.

== Plot ==
Jaclyn (Michelle Monaghan) leaves a phone message to her husband, Harrison, saying the trip is going great and asking him to call her, implying some distance in their marriage. Later, she, Kate (Leslie Bibb) and Laurie (Carrie Coon) decide to skip their yoga lesson and head to a pool at a nearby resort suggested by Valentin (Arnas Fedaravicius). Meanwhile, Belinda (Natasha Rothwell) talks with her son, Zion, who is arriving the next day for a visit.

After the recent robbery, Gaitok (Tayme Thapthimthong) meets with his supervisor and the hotel manager, Fabian, who expresses his displeasure with him for not preventing the robbery and reminds Gaitok that his job includes protecting the hotel, not merely waving to cars as they drive by. Gaitok’s supervisor gives him a handgun and tells him that he must learn to use it.

Timothy Ratliff (Jason Isaacs) continues to feel the effects of taking his wife Victoria's (Parker Posey) lorazepam, and his family notices him acting strangely. At Saxon's (Patrick Schwarzenegger) behest, the family attends a party on a yacht hosted by Chloe (Charlotte Le Bon) and "Gary" (Jon Gries). Rick (Walton Goggins) and Chelsea (Aimee Lou Wood) are also guests. Timothy swipes the bottle of lorazepam from his wife's unattended purse and drinks heavily, expressing to strangers his relief that his parents are dead and will not witness his downfall. When Victoria discovers her pills are gone, she panics.

Piper (Sarah Catherine Hook) privately tells Lochlan (Sam Nivola) that she had never planned to interview a monk in Thailand and actually plans to stay at the monastery for a year after graduation. She asks for Lochlan's support when she tells their parents later that night. Saxon and Chloe flirt openly with each other, earning Gary's ire.

When Jaclyn, Kate and Laurie arrive at the neighboring resort, Jaclyn is alarmed that the other guests are all elderly people. She demands they leave, and confronts Valentin back at The White Lotus, insisting he take them somewhere else to have fun. He takes them downtown, where locals are celebrating Songkran. Unfamiliar with the local tradition, the women flee and take refuge in a nearby shop when local children spray them with water guns. Later, the women go to a local club, where Valentin introduces them to his friends Aleksei (Julian Kostov) and Vlad (Yuri Kolokolnikov).

On the yacht, Chelsea confronts Rick for being unfriendly and unwilling to open up. He confesses that Jim Hollinger, the owner of the resort, is the man who killed his father. Chelsea reacts skeptically, but Rick says his mother told him on her deathbed that his father disappeared while attempting to protect the area from Hollinger's takeover. He now plans to go to Bangkok to confront Hollinger. Chelsea expresses fear that Rick will do something stupid, but he refuses to listen and leaves for the airport.

When the yacht docks, Saxon and Lochlan choose to stay on the boat so they can go with Chloe, Chelsea and other guests to a Full Moon Party. Piper is clearly disappointed that Lochlan will not be at dinner to support her, but says nothing.

At the hotel, Timothy gets his phone back and finds multiple emails, text messages and voicemails. He speaks with his lawyer, who tells him that Kenny has confessed to the FBI after arranging a plea deal. He suggests Timothy come to a similar deal, but he refuses, saying he'd rather die than go to prison and give up everything. Gaitok flirts with Mook, who has come by dressed for a cultural performance, and he leaves the booth unattended so he can walk her back to the hotel. Timothy panics, and looks into the empty security booth. When Gaitok returns, he finds the gun is missing.

After searching the internet, Belinda discovers that Tanya McQuoid died under suspicious circumstances in Italy (Note: As depicted in the second season episode "Arrivederci" (2022)) and that her widower, Greg, refused to cooperate with investigators. She finds a professional profile of Greg from his time as Assistant Director of the Bureau of Land Management, and confirms her suspicions that he is "Gary". Later, Gary researches Belinda on the internet, finding pictures of her and her son on her Instagram account.

== Production ==
=== Development ===
The episode was written and directed by series creator Mike White. This was White's seventeenth writing and directorial credit for the series.

=== Writing ===
Walton Goggins explained Rick's motivation after revealing the purpose of his vacation, "[He's] motivated by the need to sit in front of this guy and have him bear witness to the pain that he had caused [him]. To be able to say that to them, see them hear it — God, what an unbelievable opportunity, what an unbelievable drive." He added, "If you understand the world from their point of view and his perspective, it's very quiet and it is very reserved because of his state of mind, and who he is as a person, and understand the way that he has moved through the world on the fringes of society. He's a mystery to himself."

Charlotte Le Bon described Chloe as an "attention whore", explaining, "She's a show off; she's a bit cocky. What I like about the scene where she meets Patrick Schwarzenegger and she's like, “I hear you're a douche” — I think she's a douche as well. And she just likes to show off her things and show off how rich she is, even though it's possibly not her money, and just to put some fabulous outfit and just act as if everything is completely normal.

=== Filming ===
The episode features a scene where Timothy exposes his penis to his family after his robe opens. Jason Isaacs explained the scene, "He's drugging himself into a stupor to try not to think about the fact that his entire life is blowing up and trying to work out what to do about it." He added, "[Mike White] is trying to right the balance of how many naked women I've seen growing up on every television show and film. Nudity is the thing. He uses it sometimes for comedy, sometimes for sex, sometimes the manipulation. It's a good TV moment."

== Reception ==
=== Viewers ===
In its original American broadcast, "Hide or Seek" was seen by an estimated 0.677 million household viewers with a 0.16 in the 18-49 demographics. This means that 0.16 percent of all households with televisions watched the episode. This was a 33% increase from the previous episode, which was watched by 0.507 million household viewers with a 0.13 in the 18-49 demographics.

=== Critical reviews ===
"Hide or Seek" received mostly positive reviews from critics. The review aggregator website Rotten Tomatoes reported a 100% approval rating for the episode, based on 6 reviews, with an average rating of 9.2/10.

Manuel Betancourt of The A.V. Club gave the episode a "B+" grade and wrote, "It's fitting then that an episode titled “Hide Or Seek” tees us up to think about what this new batch of characters will find, either in Thailand or inside themselves. The line, as used in the episode, is about those who move to Thailand, but the question is clearly being posed to those who are there for this pivotal week: Are they hiding or are they seeking?"

Alan Sepinwall of Rolling Stone wrote, "We know there will be an active shooter on the property in a few days. Now we know there's at least one gun already in place, and that the person who has it feels like his world is coming to an end. That is a recipe for bad things only." Proma Khosla of IndieWire gave the episode an "A–" grade and wrote, "Written and directed by White, “Hide or Seek” is basically part one of two, setting up next week's “Full Moon Party.” By the hours end, almost every character is left in a state of uncertainty — a heightened one, rather, since one of them is inevitably going to end up dead in the future."

Amanda Whiting of Vulture gave the episode a 3 star rating out of 5 and wrote, "“Hide and Seek” felt like half an episode — or, more generously, like the opening salvo to a wild two-parter. We boarded Gary's superyacht but didn't make it to the full-moon party. The girls found a club with a vibe but no one's made any bad decisions. After breakfast, Rick and Amrita bid each other fond adieu, but that man is still kicking around Samui. Piper's parents are sitting at the dinner table, but she hasn't dropped the bomb. More menacingly, Timothy Ratliff has stolen Gaitok's handgun from the hotel security booth, but he hasn't pulled the trigger... as he must." Erik Kain of Forbes wrote, "This weekend's episode of The White Lotus ends with a promise, or perhaps a threat. As several of our heroes boat off across the ocean to an island full moon party, Saxon raises his beer in a toast: “$&%!’s about to get crazy!” he says the other partygoers. There is much merriment all around. But we know that Saxon is correct. Things are about to get very crazy, indeed, for both the staff and guests of Thailand's posh White Lotus hotel."

Noel Murray of The New York Times wrote, "White seems to love characters who are earnestly searching for something, who could be on the precipice of a real change in their lives if they could just get past their doubts, their fears, their patterns of behavior, the general sense that they are being cheated. White clearly empathizes with these people. He also manages to make them hilarious." Brady Langmann of Esquire wrote, "Now, I don't see Tim shooting up the property, but I do think he's fueled by so much Lorazepam and whiskey that he'll pull a Gaitok and misplace the gun. Who would find it? My money is still on one of the monkeys, who continue to preside over season 3. I'm serious."

Yvonne Villareal of Los Angeles Times wrote, "Not to throw his dead mother under the bus, but because this show makes me question everything it presents to me, I feel like maybe his mom told him that story on her deathbed to make him feel better about why his dad wasn't in his life. Am I being too cynical?" Helena Hunt of The Ringer wrote, "In China and Japan, the three wise monkeys represent wisdom and purity, but in the West, we've changed the symbol to stand in for those who ignore the evil around them. The Ratliff kids sure act like three monkeys, but the “wise” part doesn't apply. And their willingness (or need) to ignore that something is very off with their dad is oh so American."
