= The Meaning of Dreams =

- The White Lotus episode
- Episode no.: Season 3 Episode 3
- Directed by: Mike White
- Written by: Mike White
- Cinematography by: Ben Kutchins
- Editing by: John M. Valerio
- Original air date: March 2, 2025
- Running time: 59 minutes

Guest appearances
- Arnas Fedaravicius as Valentin; Christian Friedel as Fabian; Dom Hetrakul as Pornchai; Charlotte Le Bon as Chloe; Morgana O'Reilly as Pam; Shalini Peiris as Amrita; Yothin Udomsanti as Lek

Episode chronology
← Previous "Special Treatments"	Next → "Hide or Seek"
- The White Lotus season 3

"The Meaning of Dreams" is the third episode of the third season of the American black comedy drama anthology television series The White Lotus. It’s the sixteenth overall episode of the series and was written and directed by series creator Mike White. It originally aired on HBO on March 2, 2025 and also was available on Max on the same date.

The series follows the guests and employees of the fictional White Lotus resort chain. The season is set in Thailand, and follows the new guests, which include Rick Hatchett and his younger girlfriend Chelsea; Timothy Ratliff, his wife Victoria, and their children Saxon, Piper, and Lochlan; Jaclyn Lemon and her friends Kate and Laurie; and White Lotus Hawaii employee Belinda. In the episode, Rick reluctantly takes Chelsea on a trip downtown while Timothy begins to feel stress as his case worsens.

According to Nielsen Media Research, the episode was seen by an estimated 0.507 million household viewers and gained a 0.13 ratings share among adults aged 18–49. The episode received positive reviews from critics, who praised the performances (particularly Leslie Bibb and Walton Goggins) and themes in the episode.

== Plot ==
Influenced by her son Lochlan (Sam Nivola) and his recent fascination with tsunami videos, Victoria (Parker Posey) has a nightmare in which she walks towards the beach and is engulfed by a tsunami, with the large family home in the background. Timothy makes a phone call to his lawyer, who tells him that the FBI wants to question him. To cover up the seriousness of his situation, Timothy decides to comply with the "no phone" rule set in the hotel, entrusting all the family's electronic devices to their health mentor Pam (Morgana O'Reilly) despite Saxon's (Patrick Schwarzenegger) objections. Piper (Sarah Catherine Hook) finally visits the monastery, expressing an interest in joining their yearlong program and setting up an appointment.

Rick (Walton Goggins) approaches hotel co-owner Sritala (Lek Patravadi), a former actress and singer, and claims to be a film producer who is interested in casting her in his latest film taking place in Bangkok. Flattered, she gives him her business card. He informs Chelsea (Aimee Lou Wood) that he is leaving for Bangkok the next day, and they argue over their relationship. During a wellness session with Amrita, Rick explains that he did bad things in the past, and that his pain and anger is due to his father's murder. While hanging out with Chloe (Charlotte Le Bon), Chelsea is told that Gary was married, and that his wife committed suicide by drowning. When Chelsea leaves for town with Rick, Saxon and Chloe start flirting with each other.

As Sritala prepares to leave for Bangkok, Gaitok (Tayme Thapthimthong) greets her and naively suggests that she might want to employ him as a bodyguard. Sritala's bodyguards later approach Gaitok and mock his ambitions, saying he is incompetent for failing to stop the robbery at the hotel boutique. (Note: As seen in "Special Treatments".) Later, Gaitok's supervisor Lek (Yothin Udomsanti) tells him he must attend a meeting with Fabian the next morning.

Jaclyn (Michelle Monaghan), Kate (Leslie Bibb) and Laurie (Carrie Coon) take part in a yoga session. Jaclyn books Laurie for an energy healing session with their health mentor Valentin (Arnas Fedaravicius) and tries to goad her into having a fling with him. That night, while dining, Kate reveals that she now regularly attends church with her husband and is uncomfortable with New Age-style spirituality. The conversation quickly shifts to politics; Jaclyn and Laurie, both liberals, are shocked to discover that Kate identifies as an independent. Asked directly if she voted for Donald Trump, Kate evades the question. Later that evening, she overhears Jaclyn and Laurie gossiping about her, criticizing her conservative political and religious views.

In a nearby town with Chelsea, Rick legally purchases cannabis and impulsively goes to a ramshackle snake farm where a cobra show is being put on for tourists. During the performance, Rick zones out due to the effects of the cannabis and leaves the room. Feeling sympathy for the caged snakes, he releases several of them. When Chelsea goes to check up on him, one of the snakes bites her on the leg. Chelsea is rushed by the show's crew to a nearby hospital, with Rick following in a tuk-tuk.

While dining with Pornchai (Dom Hetrakul), Belinda (Natasha Rothwell) opens up about her previous job at the White Lotus in Maui, Hawaii. She went through a period of depression after her friend and manager Armond was accidentally killed, and her hopes for setting up her own wellness center were dashed when her prospective business partner Tanya abandoned the plan after getting involved with a man at the hotel. Feeling she recognizes the man (Jon Gries) from that time, she approaches him at a table to ask him. She addresses him as Greg, but he maintains that he was never in Hawaii, and that his name is Gary. Belinda and Pornchai drink more than usual and show a mutual attraction to each other. When she arrives at her room, she notices an open window, and becomes unsettled.

Timothy misses dinner after taking one of Victoria's pills, sending him to sleep for the entire afternoon and evening. He takes another without her knowledge in order to sleep again that night.

== Production ==
=== Development ===
The episode was written and directed by series creator Mike White. This was White's sixteenth writing and directorial credit for the series.

=== Writing ===
Regarding Belinda's storyline, Natasha Rothwell said, "For her, this terror that's looming, and the potential of that, might lead her to some solace in Pornchai as a safe space, as a thing she can take some delight in. It might mean things are more precarious. You might be juggling one side a little bit better than the other, but I really think that's the beauty of this season. Light and dark necessitate each other." She added that Jon Gries's performance scared her, "There's like a shift that happens when he puts on Greg and looks at Belinda that just... My blood would run cold because you know that he has a potential for evil. And it's done with a smile, which is just so subtle, which is equally as terrifying."

The conversation about Donald Trump was written in 2022. Leslie Bibb explained, "When we were filming it, it actually felt like it was going to be irrelevant. It's randomly current. I think it's so easy to be divisive, and it felt like Mike — not that he wasn't picking a side — was just showing that not everybody's a villain. She wasn't going to ruin this holiday over who she voted for."

=== Filming ===
The scenes at the cobra show used real snakes. Walton Goggins explained that he was deeply scared of the snakes, "It was fucking horrific. It was a horror show. It was a nightmare for me, really, genuinely. It was two days of like, 'I can't, I can't, I can't,' and they had somebody right off camera, as soon as I would pick a snake up, I'd bring it over and put it in their arms like, 'Oh my God,' and almost fucking pass out every time." While filming the scene, Goggins was bitten by one of the snakes. He was given Neosporin, although a producer suggested that he should go to a hospital for a tetanus shot.

== Reception ==
=== Viewers ===
In its original American broadcast, "The Meaning of Dreams" was seen by an estimated 0.507 million household viewers with a 0.13 in the 18-49 demographics. This means that 0.13 percent of all households with televisions watched the episode. This was a 27% decrease from the previous episode, which was watched by 0.687 million household viewers with a 0.16 in the 18-49 demographics.

=== Critical reviews ===
"The Meaning of Dreams" received positive reviews from critics. The review aggregator website Rotten Tomatoes reported a 100% approval rating for the episode, based on seven reviews, with an average rating of 6.8/10.

Manuel Betancourt of The A.V. Club gave the episode a "B+" grade and wrote, "Indeed, each season of the show is a perfectly calibrated pressure cooker, which forces our affable guests (and especially those who aren't so affable to begin with) to start sweating the small stuff only to then be overrun with all-encompassing anxieties that lead them to... well, we all know what happened to Jennifer Coolidge's Tanya, right? In this season's third episode, “The Meaning of Dreams,” we find this cadre of guests perspiring for all sorts of reasons."

Alan Sepinwall of Rolling Stone wrote, "When she tells the family about it later, Piper suggests it could have been “some kind of warning,” while of course Saxon scoffs at the idea that dreams have any predictive value. But it certainly feels like storms are on the way for many of the guests and staffers." Proma Khosla of IndieWire wrote, "That’s pretty much the sentiment governing Season 3, Episode 3, “The Meaning of Dreams,” written and directed by showrunner Mike White. All our key characters are inching toward catastrophe, whether that's ending up dead in the water or causing their own calamitous downfall."

Amanda Whiting of Vulture gave the episode a 4 star rating out of 5 and wrote, "I think it's fair to say that across all three seasons of The White Lotus, Mike White's sea has been a biblical presence: roiling, dark, destructive. This week's episode opens with water washing over Victoria Ratliff's feet while her kids sit a few yards away on a blue-tinged, predawn beach." Erik Kain of Forbes wrote, "All told, another excellent episode of The White Lotus, but definitely a slow burn. I get the feeling that the first half of this season will be mostly setup, with all the payoff unfolding as we near the finale."

Noel Murray of The New York Times wrote, "So yes, water can be cleansing. But as Tim learns with every distressing new phone message, the water can't clean without washing something away." Brady Langmann of Esquire wrote, "There's not a terrible amount to say about Mike White's latest dispatch from Thailand—because episode 3, aptly named "The Meaning of Dreams," feels like the last setup episode before the murder mystery really starts moving. One noteworthy thing that episode 3 does do, however, is tell us that we should consider just about everyone a suspect — except for sweet Chelsea and Gaitok. We must protect them at all costs."

Meredith Blake of Los Angeles Times wrote, "I thought it was interesting, and maybe a tad implausible, that word of Tanya's death hadn't gotten back to Belinda, either through news reports or the White Lotus grapevine. Surely if a fabulously wealthy heiress like Tanya died under mysterious circumstances after traveling aboard a yacht where numerous people were shot and killed, it would attract media attention and probably spawn a million podcasts." Katie Baker of The Ringer wrote, "In Episode 3, titled “The Meaning of Dreams,” snakes and men alike try to wriggle out of the unfriendly confines of their current lives. Some slither into oblivion. Others try their damnedest to do so, even if it means taking desperate measures like locking away everyone’s electronic devices and popping pills."

=== Accolades ===
TVLine named Walton Goggins the "Performer of the Week" for the week of March 8, 2025, for his performance in the episode. The site wrote, "With a panicked look in his soulful eyes, Goggins finally let us see how much Rick truly cares for Chelsea as he rushed with her to the hospital. She was fine, though, and he later took issue with her labeling snakes as evil: “Even evil things shouldn't be treated like [shit]. It's only gonna make them more evil.” For someone who just came off as a grumpy jerk at first, Rick has really blossomed into a fascinating character, and Goggins' insightful work has made him the true VIP guest of Season 3 so far."
