= Same Spirits, New Forms =

- The White Lotus episode
- The Ratliff family arrives to the resort
- Episode no.: Season 3 Episode 1
- Directed by: Mike White
- Written by: Mike White
- Cinematography by: Ben Kutchins
- Editing by: John M. Valerio
- Original air date: February 16, 2025
- Running time: 61 minutes

Guest appearances
- Jon Gries as Greg Hunt; Nicholas Duvernay as Zion Lindsey; Arnas Fedaravicius as Valentin; Christian Friedel as Fabian; Dom Hetrakul as Pornchai; Charlotte Le Bon as Chloe; Morgana O'Reilly as Pam; Shalini Peiris as Amrita

Episode chronology
← Previous "Arrivederci"	Next → "Special Treatments"
- The White Lotus season 3

"Same Spirits, New Forms" is the first episode of the third season of the American black comedy drama anthology television series The White Lotus. It is the fourteenth overall episode of the series and was written and directed by series creator Mike White. It originally aired on HBO on February 16, 2025, and also was available on Max on the same date.

The series follows the guests and employees of the fictional White Lotus resort chain. The season is set in Thailand, and follows the new guests, which include Rick Hatchett and his younger girlfriend Chelsea; Timothy Ratliff, his wife Victoria, and their children Saxon, Piper, and Lochlan; Jaclyn Lemon and her friends Kate and Laurie; and White Lotus Hawaii employee Belinda.

According to Nielsen Media Research, the episode was seen by an estimated 0.420 million household viewers and gained a 0.09 ratings share among adults aged 18–49. The episode received positive reviews from critics, who lauded the episode's performances and cinematography, although there were mixed reactions towards the episode's pacing.

== Plot ==
At the White Lotus resort in Thailand, employee Amrita (Shalini Peiris) is guiding a new guest named Zion (Nicholas Duvernay) through a meditation session. As they begin meditating, gunshots are suddenly heard nearby and they see hotel guests fleeing. Amrita runs for cover while Zion, concerned for his mother, jumps into a nearby lake to attempt to reach her. Upon spotting a body floating near him, he retreats in shock as police sirens are heard.

One week earlier, health mentor Mook (Lalisa Manobal) gets a ride to work from security guard Gaitok (Tayme Thapthimthong), who has a romantic interest in her. Gaitok has a dull job managing the parking lot, and Mook pushes him to consider being more ambitious, like the owners' armed bodyguards whose jobs are perceived by Mook as more glamorous.

Resort co-owner Sritala Hollinger (Lek Patravadi), general manager Fabian (Christian Friedel), and health mentors Mook, Pam (Morgana O'Reilly) and Valentin (Arnas Fedaravičius) welcome the new guests. These include bad-tempered Rick Hatchett (Walton Goggins) and his younger British girlfriend Chelsea (Aimee Lou Wood), financier Timothy Ratliff (Jason Isaacs), his wife Victoria (Parker Posey) and their grown children Saxon (Patrick Schwarzenegger), Piper (Sarah Catherine Hook), and Lochlan (Sam Nivola); television star Jaclyn Lemon (Michelle Monaghan) and her high school friends Kate (Leslie Bibb) and Laurie (Carrie Coon); and Belinda Lindsey (Natasha Rothwell), wellness manager from the White Lotus resort in Maui, who is beginning a three-month work exchange program. Her son Zion is due to arrive at the hotel soon.

Employee Pornchai (Dom Hetrakul) introduces Belinda to a spirit house devoted to Brahma, explaining that they give offerings due to their belief that spirits walk among them. Belinda is genuinely interested in learning more about their cultural and spiritual traditions, but also very happy to be living in luxury for the next three months.

The Ratliffs are alarmed by the resort's intense focus on health and wellness, which includes cell phones being prohibited in public spaces, and decline to hand in their devices, although Victoria is open to the idea. Piper is pleased when Lochlan agrees to accompany her to a nearby monastery. She plans to interview a local monk for her senior thesis, but when they arrive at the monastery, she does not follow through with her plan, feeling that she is not ready. Lochlan joins Saxon at the resort pool, where the latter tries unsuccessfully to flirt with Chelsea, as well as with Jaclyn and her friends. Saxon tells Lochlan of his plans to help him lose his virginity and gives advice on how to be more of an alpha male-type.

That night, Timothy is called by a Wall Street Journal journalist, who is interested in a fund he created with his partner Kenneth Nguyen and Nguyen's ties to the government of Brunei. Despite claiming not to have contacted Nguyen in four years, Timothy leaves him a phone message asking him to call him.

While Chelsea wants to do wellness treatment activities, Rick is very reluctant and more interested in Hollinger's American husband Jim, who he learns is in Bangkok recovering from a recent illness. After arguing with Rick over dinner, Chelsea goes to the bar, where she befriends Chloe (Charlotte Le Bon), a Québécois model who lives nearby. Chloe points out her boyfriend, Gary (Jon Gries), (Note: Revealed to be Greg Hunt, Tanya McQuoid's widower from previous seasons.) seated alone at a table.

Jaclyn is paying for the trip for Kate and Laurie. Kate is married to a wealthy Texas businessman. Laurie, a divorced mother and corporate lawyer, is the least financially successful of the three. As her friends excessively compliment each other on their looks and successes, only occasionally including her in the conversation, Laurie feels increasingly alienated. Eventually, she excuses herself to go to bed, and as Jaclyn and Kate continue their conversation, she breaks down in tears.

Saxon and Lochlan share a bedroom in their family's villa, and Saxon speculates that their sister is still a virgin despite being "hot". Saxon goes to the bathroom to masturbate to porn, nude in full view of his younger brother. Lochlan stares at Saxon until the two lock eyes in the bathroom mirror and Saxon finally closes the door.

Meanwhile, Timothy and Victoria discuss their marriage and family, and Victoria expresses pride in her husband's achievements.

== Production ==
=== Development ===
The episode was written and directed by series creator Mike White. This was White's fourteenth writing and directorial credit for the series.

=== Writing ===
On the opening scene, Michelle Monaghan said, "There's a duality between light and dark, which you see and know immediately from that first scene. It's immediately clear what you're dealing with: there's a spirituality here in season three, and you're starting to see some of how it's represented."

=== Casting ===
Natasha Rothwell returns as a series regular after her appearance in the first season. She said that she kept in touch with White and both worked on ways to bring her character back, "We had some amazing conversations about where she is and where we see her going. It's just a gift to be able to put the character back on again and have him at the helm of the ship." She also commented on Belinda's role in Greg's return, "I think once she puts the pieces of the puzzle together, she's in real fear for her life, because she knows what he's capable of. It's no longer about Tanya. It's about her son and her staying safe and not getting mixed up in whatever he has going on." Several reviewers expressed surprise at the return of Jon Gries as Greg, as he had not been announced as a cast member prior to broadcast.

The episode features cameo appearances by Natalie Cole and Carl Boudreaux, who competed alongside White on Survivor: David vs. Goliath.

== Reception ==
=== Viewers ===
In its original American broadcast, "Same Spirits, New Forms" was seen by an estimated 0.420 million household viewers with a 0.09 in the 18-49 demographics. This means that 0.09 percent of all households with televisions watched the episode. This was a 51% decrease from the previous episode, which was watched by 0.854 million household viewers with a 0.19 in the 18-49 demographics.

=== Critical reviews ===
"Same Spirits, New Forms" received positive reviews from critics. The review aggregator website Rotten Tomatoes reported a 100% approval rating for the episode, based on 10 reviews, with an average rating of 7.7/10.

Manuel Betancourt of The A.V. Club gave the episode a "B" grade and wrote, "“Identity is a prison.” We're only one episode into The White Lotus' much-anticipated third season. But let me posit already that this throwaway line may well prove to be the central thesis of Mike White's latest sojourn into the world of affluent and clueless tourists who travel far afield to try (and maybe fail) to find themselves."

Alan Sepinwall of Rolling Stone wrote, "The first season ended mostly with heartbreak, or worse, for the Maui staffers, while the lower-class Sicilian characters did surprisingly well. Season One's corpse worked at the hotel, while Season Two's was Tanya. Which side will come out of this adventure on better footing? The odds of the series, as in the real world, are stacked heavily in favor of the ones with all the money. But we've got seven more hours to see how it all plays out, now that most of the key figures are established." Proma Khosla of IndieWire gave the episode an "A–" grade and wrote, "For now, they all begin their week at the White Lotus blissfully unaware of the shocking events to come. Tragedy is just around the corner, but for many of the characters it's already unfolding in ways that are all-too familiar."

Amanda Whiting of Vulture gave the episode a 4 star rating out of 5 and wrote, "Mike White populates his island resorts with rich and powerful guests who believe that they make their own fates. It's a conception that couldn't be more at odds with the principles of Buddhism that surround these castaways now. That karma is real; that there will be a next life in which you are judged for this one; that identity is a prison. That you can hide yourself beyond the tall walls of an exclusive resort on a small island on the opposite side of the world, but one needs community to truly take refuge." Erik Kain of Forbes wrote, "Suffice to say, I was hooked from the moment this episode began and remained engrossed throughout the episode. Sure, after this opening moment not a lot really happens, and yet the writing and production are so great, I can't help but hang onto every word."

Noel Murray of The New York Times wrote, "White this season is leaning even harder than usual into his exotic setting, emphasizing the intoxicating, hypnotic sounds of the wind and the animals moving through the swaying trees. He wants us to be lulled." Paul Dailly of TV Fanatic gave the episode a 3.25 star rating out of 5 and wrote, "Unfortunately, the magic that made the first two seasons so iconic is no longer present, as the premiere introduces a wealth of characters and not enough plot."

Greg Braxton of Los Angeles Times wrote, "I'm going to be a bit of a spoiler here. The White Lotus set such a high bar in its previous seasons in every category — story, casting, direction, writing. Mike White is truly a force of nature and his development of all the diverse personalities is so precise and insightful. So I'm mildly disappointed that this beginning didn't grab me as much. The slow burn is a bit too slow and undercooked. But I can be patient, putting my trust in Mike and the amazing cast that this season will ultimately be rewarding." Ben Lindbergh of The Ringer wrote, "Despite the guests' reprehensible behavior and the show's best efforts to instill a sense of creeping dread, I still find watching The White Lotus a soothing experience. Credit the comic relief, the catchy soundtrack, and the sumptuous, slow-motion cinematography, as White intersperses glimpses of the island's natural splendor with the underwater photography he's leaned on since Enlightened. Sure, maybe those angles are meant to convey how close his characters are to drowning, but water can be cleansing, too."
