= Full-Moon Party =

- The White Lotus episode
- Episode no.: Season 3 Episode 5
- Directed by: Mike White
- Written by: Mike White
- Cinematography by: Ben Kutchins
- Editing by: Scott Turner
- Original air date: March 16, 2025
- Running time: 62 minutes

Guest appearances
- Sam Rockwell as Frank; Arnas Fedaravicius as Valentin; Christian Friedel as Fabian; Dom Hetrakul as Pornchai; Julian Kostov as Aleksei; Yuri Kolokolnikov as Vlad; Charlotte Le Bon as Chloe

Episode chronology
← Previous "Hide or Seek"	Next → "Denials"
- The White Lotus season 3

"Full-Moon Party" is the fifth episode of the third season of the American black comedy drama anthology television series The White Lotus. It is the eighteenth overall episode of the series and was written and directed by series creator Mike White. It originally aired on HBO on March 16, 2025, and also was available on Max on the same date.

The series follows the guests and employees of the fictional White Lotus resort chain. The season is set in Thailand, and follows the new guests, which include Rick Hatchett and his younger girlfriend Chelsea; Timothy Ratliff, his wife Victoria, and their children Saxon, Piper, and Lochlan; Jaclyn Lemon and her friends Kate and Laurie; and White Lotus Hawaii employee Belinda. In the episode, Timothy faces a dilemma when he steals Gaitok's gun, while Saxon and Lochlan go to the Full Moon Party with Chloe and Chelsea. Meanwhile, Rick reconnects with an old friend, and Jaclyn, Kate and Laurie spend the night with Valentin and his friends.

According to Nielsen Media Research, the episode was seen by an estimated 0.828 million household viewers and gained a 0.19 ratings share among adults aged 18–49. The episode received mostly positive reviews, with critics praising the performances (particularly Sam Rockwell), writing, themes, and intrigue, although there were mixed reactions towards the lack of story progression. The episode received a nomination for Outstanding Writing for a Drama Series at the 77th Primetime Emmy Awards.

== Plot ==
Gaitok (Tayme Thapthimthong) checks security footage of the booth, finding that Timothy (Jason Isaacs) broke into the booth and stole his gun. Piper (Sarah Catherine Hook) tells her parents she lied about coming to Thailand to write a thesis, and wants to return to Thailand after graduating to attend the meditation center for at least a year. Victoria (Parker Posey) is horrified that Piper is becoming so deeply involved in Buddhism, despite the family being only nominal Christians themselves. Meanwhile, Timothy barely reacts, having taken large amounts of his wife's lorazepam during the day. Gaitok privately approaches Timothy and timidly asks for the gun back, but Timothy denies all knowledge.

Chloe (Charlotte Le Bon), Chelsea (Aimee Lou Wood), and brothers Saxon (Patrick Schwarzenegger) and Lochlan (Sam Nivola) arrive at the Full Moon Party. After failing to contact Rick (Walton Goggins), Chelsea decides to take part in the night, and Chloe provides party drugs for the group. Saxon initially declines the offer, but after Lochlan readily downs a pill, he gives in to peer pressure and takes a dose. They party until dawn and return to the yacht, where Chelsea tells Chloe she fears prioritizing Rick's feelings over her own. Later, they continue to drink with Saxon and Lochlan. The two women playfully kiss, and Chloe then kisses Lochlan. At Chloe's suggestion, Lochlan gives Saxon a brief peck. Egged on by her, Lochlan gives Saxon a longer, more passionate kiss, disorienting his visibly high older brother.

Fabian (Christian Friedel) tells Belinda (Natasha Rothwell) that an American guest had asked about her. Frightened, Belinda explains that the man, "Gary", is actually called Greg and is wanted for questioning regarding the death of his wife, whom Belinda met in Maui. Fabian balks at Belinda's suggestion that they call the police, worried that she may be mistaken and that they could insult a frequent guest of the resort. Pornchai (Dom Hetrakul) discovers the source of the noise in Belinda's room, a harmless monitor lizard, of which Belinda has a phobia. Belinda asks Pornchai to stay in her room for the night, to which he agrees. Later, Belinda awkwardly expresses consent, and they share a kiss.

In Bangkok, Rick meets with his friend Frank (Sam Rockwell), a recovering alcoholic, who discreetly provides him with a gun. Over drinks, Frank recalls moving to Thailand because of legal troubles in the U.S. and his attraction to Asian women. After thousands of drunken sexual encounters, Frank became insatiable and began having sex with ladyboys and then began to dress like one and have sex with other men to try to feel as though he was having sex with himself. To exit the cycle of alcohol abuse and lust, Frank has begun to explore sobriety and Buddhism.

At the nightclub, Jaclyn (Michelle Monaghan) and Laurie (Carrie Coon) drink heavily and dance with Valentin (Arnas Fedaravicius), Aleksei (Julian Kostov) and Vlad (Yuri Kolokolnikov), while Kate (Leslie Bibb) stays relatively sober and keeps an eye out for her friends. Laurie and Valentin continue to flirt, but when three Russian women arrive to argue with Aleksei and Vlad, Jaclyn invites the men to come back to their villa with them. Kate suggests they just go to bed, and back at the villa she watches with alarm as her friends continue to drink heavily and swim with the men. Laurie skinny dips and then drunkenly discusses her divorce with Valentin before Kate insists the men leave. Later, Jaclyn sneaks Valentin into her room to have sex.

Timothy writes a suicide note and puts the gun to his head, but is interrupted when Victoria appears. He admits his stress is getting to him, but Victoria reassures him he has been successful enough. After she leaves, Timothy prays to God, asking what to do.

== Production ==
=== Development ===
The episode was written and directed by series creator Mike White. This was White's eighteenth writing and directorial credit for the series.

=== Writing ===
Describing the scenes between Jaclyn, Kate and Laurie, Carrie Coon explained, "It could have been a very positive turning point in the vacation for them. It is a reclamation of their youth, it is fun and sexy. And it feels like the vacation they all wanted. Instead, we have what is perceived in Laurie's eyes as a betrayal. It's also a reinforcement of patterns of behavior and a question of when we return to friend groups from our youth: Do we just default to our position? Or are we able to re-assert ourselves?"

Regarding the kiss between Saxon and Lochlan, Patrick Schwarzenegger said, "If you watch the other seasons, you have an idea of what Mike White's looking for. I remember the first time he told me what he was looking for with this role, how he wanted him to be this kind of douchebag that was so ridiculous, so without a filter. But also really funny and charismatic — that you loved to hate him, but you also kind of love him." Sam Nivola added, "[Lochlan is] just an incredibly insecure guy, a real people pleaser who needs something from the people. He's not very self-sufficient, he needs love and support from the people around him in his life, and I think he's willing to go to all the lengths to find the people he loves."

Jason Isaacs addressed Timothy's suicide attempt, "[It's] the banality, the normality [of] the two of them going to bed... He's not going to turn around and go, ‘I was just about to kill myself, darling, go back to bed.’ So he can't do it then." Isaacs added that despite not moving forward with the suicide, "I don't think suicidal instinct has gone at all for him."

=== Casting ===
The episode includes a guest appearance by Sam Rockwell as Frank, an old friend of Rick. Walton Goggins was friends with Rockwell, and described the scene as "some of the best times" he had while filming the series. He said, "I will say that that monologue was word for word. That's what Mike [White] wrote, and he wrote it all just like that. It is one of the greatest monologues I've ever read in my life."

== Reception ==
=== Viewers ===
In its original American broadcast, "Full-Moon Party" was seen by an estimated 0.828 million household viewers with a 0.19 in the 18-49 demographics. This means that 0.19 percent of all households with televisions watched the episode. This was a 22% increase from the previous episode, which was watched by 0.677 million household viewers with a 0.16 in the 18-49 demographics.

=== Critical reviews ===
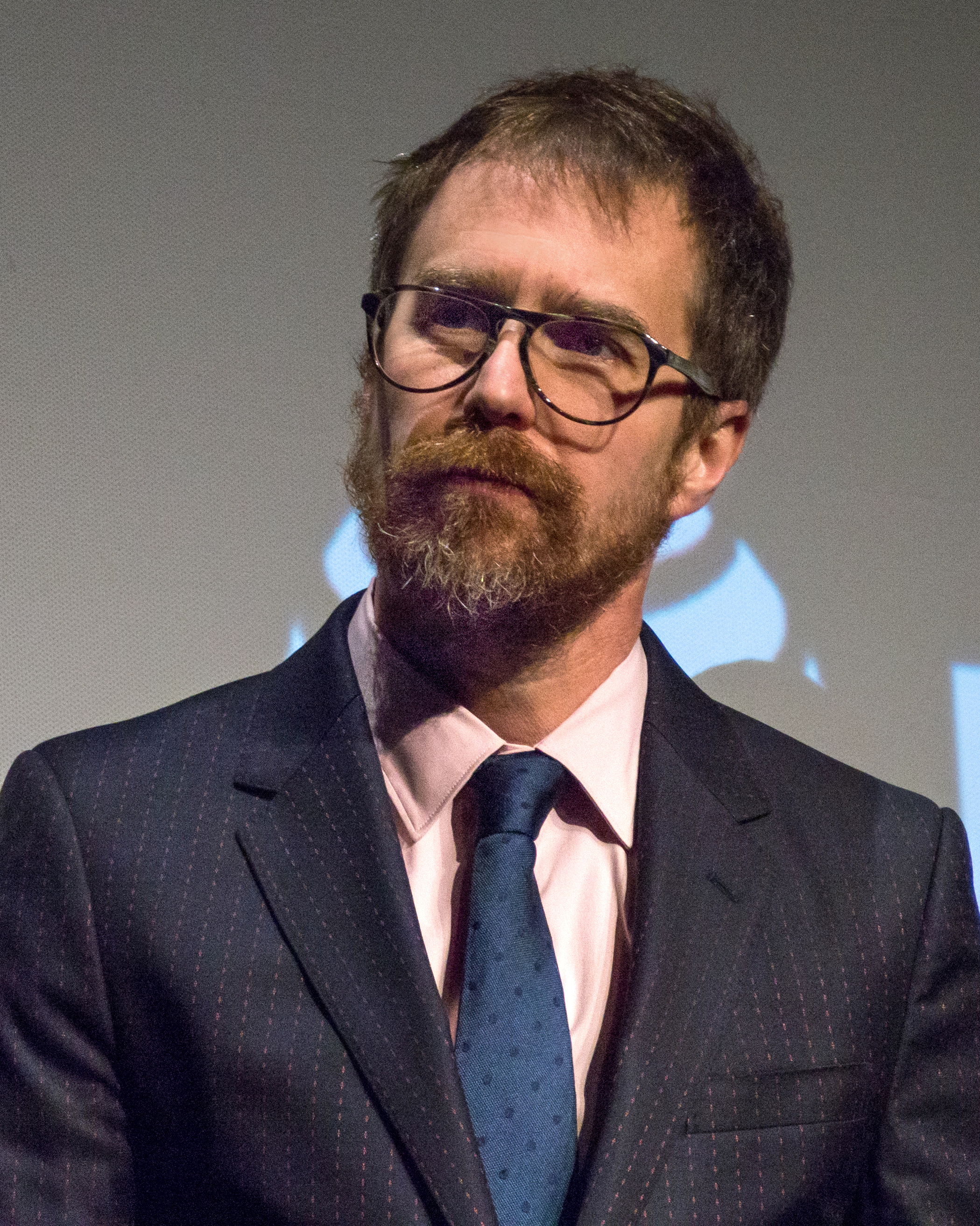
Sam Rockwell garnered acclaim for his performance in the episode.

"Full-Moon Party" received mostly positive reviews. The review aggregator website Rotten Tomatoes reported a 70% approval rating for the episode, based on 10 reviews, with an average rating of 8.2/10.

Manuel Betancourt of The A.V. Club gave the episode an "A" grade and wrote, "It's no surprise that this fifth episode, structured as a kind of reveling rupture amid these guests' otherwise quite peaceful hotel stay (give or take an armed robbery), was all about two opposing forces: abandon and restraint. So much so that a key conversation between two characters in Bangkok served as a kind of distillation of White's interests in this third sojourn at a White Lotus hotel."

Alan Sepinwall of Rolling Stone wrote, "Picking up only an hour or two after the events of last week’s episode, it puts most of the characters into more heightened, debauched, or intense situations, as ideas that have been simmering all season get closer to a boil." Proma Khosla of IndieWire gave the episode an "A" grade and wrote, "After a slow start, The White Lotus delivers Mike White's version of an action-packed episode with this fifth installment, and it's the most interesting hour by far for Schwarzenegger's character."

Amanda Whiting of Vulture gave the episode a perfect 5 star rating out of 5 and wrote, "The White Lotus is at its best when it shows you something so ugly and so relatable that you find yourself reaching for the remote, fighting the unbearable urge to switch it off. It makes your TV into a mirror." Erik Kain of Forbes wrote, "This was yet another tremendous episode of The White Lotus, and probably the most stressful one of the season so far. I spent the whole time on the edge of my seat waiting for something bad to go down and then (mostly) nothing did, outside of some bad friend behavior from Jaclyn and a weird incestuous kiss between brothers. But I suspect that bad things will happen, and quite soon."

Noel Murray of The New York Times wrote, "Rockwell is not this episode's main character. But he does deliver a knockout monologue that is one of the season's standout scenes. And his speech would likely be the most talked about White Lotus moment this week were it not for the rather shocking kiss at the end of the episode." Brady Langmann of Esquire wrote, "Series creator Mike White has set a compelling table with a brilliant ensemble cast, as always. The Ratliff dynasty is devolving into shambles, Gary-Greg is in full pursuit of Belinda, Rick is about to deliver justice, and the girls trip is spiraling out of control. I love a slow burn, but with only three episodes left in season 3, I wanted one domino to fall in episode 5. Just one! We've lived in Thailand with these vacationers for five hours now, and I feel like I'm still watching the water boil."

Yvonne Villareal of Los Angeles Times wrote, "White Lotus is all about exaggerated stereotypes and cultural conflicts and prejudices. And this reveal from Rockwell's character, which touched on his experience with kathoey, Thailand's ladyboys, who have long been part of the country's cultural landscape, as a privileged westerner grappling with existential sexual curiosity and identity (or is he?) left a striking impression — as it was undoubtedly meant to do. The pairing of Rockwell and Goggins, simply sipping on scotch and chamomile tea as it all unfolded, was stunning to watch." Claire McNear of The Ringer wrote, "What we need to do now, though, is discuss Sam Rockwell's ultra-chaotic appearance on The White Lotus, a once-in-a-century corpse flower burst suddenly out of the leafy calm of its host, its magnificent, repulsive, compulsively enticing jewels on hideous display for all."

=== Accolades ===
TVLine named Sam Rockwell as an honorable mention for the "Performer of the Week" for the week of March 22, 2025, for his performance in the episode. The site wrote, "Has anyone ever done more with less screen time than Sam Rockwell did on The White Lotus this week? The Oscar winner made a surprise cameo as Rick's pal Frank, who met up with Rick in Bangkok — and shared just about the wildest sex story we've ever heard, revealing that his sex addiction led to him dressing up like an Asian girl and having sex with men, all in the pursuit of a satisfaction that lasts. Rockwell's face didn't betray a hint of irony as Frank unspooled his bizarre tale while sipping chamomile tea, cloaking each word with a serenity that only comes from pushing desire to the absolute limit. It was a virtuoso monologue that topped anything we've seen from The White Lotus yet — and that's saying something — and with his hilariously nonchalant delivery, Rockwell made the most out of every minute."

=== Response from Duke University ===
Officials at Duke University raised objections to Timothy Ratliff's wearing of a shirt with the school's name on it as he puts a gun to his head to attempt suicide, stating that “prominently wearing apparel bearing Duke’s federally registered trademarks creates confusion and mistakenly suggests an endorsement or affiliation where none exists.” A trademark expert told Front Office Sports that Duke was creating a Streisand effect situation in addressing the scene. Indeed, the scene would gain popularity on social media a few weeks later after Duke's men's basketball team suffered a stunning defeat in the NCAA Final Four.
