= Special Treatments =

- The White Lotus episode
- Episode no.: Season 3 Episode 2
- Directed by: Mike White
- Written by: Mike White
- Cinematography by: Ben Kutchins
- Editing by: Scott Turner
- Original air date: February 23, 2025
- Running time: 61 minutes

Guest appearances
- Arnas Fedaravicius as Valentin; Christian Friedel as Fabian; Dom Hetrakul as Pornchai; Julian Kostov as Aleksei; Yuri Kolokolnikov as Vlad; Charlotte Le Bon as Chloe; Morgana O'Reilly as Pam; Shalini Peiris as Amrita

Episode chronology
← Previous "Same Spirits, New Forms"	Next → "The Meaning of Dreams"
- The White Lotus season 3

"Special Treatments" is the second episode of the third season of the American black comedy drama anthology television series The White Lotus. It is the fifteenth overall episode of the series and was written and directed by series creator Mike White. It originally aired on HBO on February 23, 2025, and also was available on Max on the same date.

The series follows the guests and employees of the fictional White Lotus resort chain. The season is set in Thailand, and follows the new guests, which include Rick Hatchett and his younger girlfriend Chelsea; Timothy Ratliff, his wife Victoria, and their children Saxon, Piper, and Lochlan; Jaclyn Lemon and her friends Kate and Laurie; and White Lotus Hawaii employee Belinda. In the episode, the guests participate in many wellness programs. The friendship between Jaclyn, Kate and Laurie is explored, while Timothy's situation worsens.

According to Nielsen Media Research, the episode was seen by an estimated 0.687 million household viewers and gained a 0.16 ratings share among adults aged 18–49. The episode received positive reviews from critics, who praised the performances, character development and themes.

== Plot ==
Continuing their conversation (Note: As seen in "Same Spirits, New Forms".) late into the night, Jaclyn (Michelle Monaghan) and Kate (Leslie Bibb) talk about Laurie (Carrie Coon). Kate mentions that Laurie has been through an acrimonious divorce and, as the main income earner of the household, must now pay alimony. She also mentions that Laurie's daughter Ellie has been expelled from two schools for violent behavior, which Kate attributes to growing up in New York. Jaclyn also surmises that Laurie did not get her expected promotion to be a partner in her law firm which Kate believes might explain her heavy drinking and "defeated" attitude. Suddenly, a drunk Laurie noisily knocks on the door, scaring Jaclyn and Kate, before retrieving her phone charger.

The following morning, Kate runs into the Ratliffs and recognizes Victoria (Parker Posey) from a mutual friend's baby shower in Austin ten years earlier. Victoria acknowledges it but acts coldly towards Kate. When Saxon (Patrick Schwarzenegger) mentions that Kate's friend Jaclyn is a famous actress, Victoria is unimpressed, saying that actresses are basically prostitutes.

The guests undergo wellness programs, with the exception of Timothy who prefers to go to the gym. At Chelsea's (Aimee Lou Wood) insistence, Rick (Walton Goggins) attends a meditation session with therapist Amrita (Shalini Peiris). Chelsea also tells Rick that she has agreed to dine with Chloe (Charlotte Le Bon) and her boyfriend later, much to his annoyance. During his session, Rick tells Amrita that his mother was a drug addict who died when he was 10 and that his father was murdered before he was born. He tells her he normally deals with his high stress levels by self-medicating with cannabis, but not while traveling.

Gaitok (Tayme Thapthimthong) convinces Mook (Lalisa Manobal) to have lunch with him. He confesses his feelings for her, but she gently dismisses them. While relaxing, Lochlan (Sam Nivola) tells Piper (Sarah Catherine Hook) that Saxon has mocked her lack of a sex life, upsetting her; he then offends her further by asking whether it is true. Belinda (Natasha Rothwell) and Pornchai (Dom Hetrakul) give each other their respective signature massage treatments; Belinda is clearly infatuated with him.

Chelsea goes shopping with Chloe at the hotel's high-end clothing and jewelry boutique, using Greg's credit card. Valentin talks to Gaitok about an upcoming Muay Thai match, and a distracted Gaitok fails to stop an SUV from passing the barrier. A masked man then enters the store and steals jewelry at gunpoint, terrifying Chelsea. Gaitok attempts to stop the man from escaping in the SUV but is struck in the head with the butt of the gun. He is treated by medics and returns to work, earning Mook's admiration. Rick shows a rare sign of affection for Chelsea, spontaneously comforting her after her ordeal.

Along with acrobats and dancers, a band comprising several White Lotus employees performs as the guests dine that night, and owner Sritala (Lek Patravadi) proves to be an excellent singer. Rick and Chelsea dine with Chloe and her boyfriend, Greg (Jon Gries). Greg, whom Chloe introduces as "Gary", does not open up about his past, simply claiming he is retired; Rick is similarly cagey. Chloe, being from Quebec, is offended when Greg describes her as French. Belinda spots Greg and appears to recognize him. Chloe tells them she met Greg through a matchmaking service in Dubai; Rick immediately pegs her as a prostitute. Later, Rick tells Chelsea that he will leave for Bangkok for a few days, not explaining the purpose of the journey.

Alone in their room, Kate and Laurie begin to talk about Jaclyn, deeming her a narcissist who, despite claiming to have a loving marriage, does not spend much time with her attractive younger husband. Jaclyn, who is in the next room, overhears at least some of the conversation.

Timothy (Jason Isaacs) finally receives a call from Kenneth (Ke Huy Quan), who is in a state of panic. Following a tip-off from an employee, FBI agents have raided his office and seized various documents and electronic records, which also implicate Timothy. Timothy is furious, saying he did the deal as a favor, and now faces ruin over a mere $10 million. After failing to contact a lawyer, an agitated Timothy returns with his family, unsure of his future.

== Production ==
=== Development ===
The episode was written and directed by series creator Mike White. This was White's fifteenth writing and directorial credit for the series.

=== Writing ===
Regarding the friendship between Jaclyn, Kate and Laurie, Mike White explained, "I just remember that there have been times where I've been on vacations, and you'd see women friends together, and you were just like, ‘I can't really get a vibe of what's going on?’ And then one would leave and the other two would start talking. They're triangulating in some way. And so there's some of that in the early episodes. But it's this sense of sameness and then focusing on the differences, and how you have to justify your life to certain types of people that have that history with you."

Aimee Lou Wood explained the robbery scene, "While the robbery was happening, Chelsea thought this might make Rick look after her. She sees these scary things but he might hold [her] because she went through something and got the room comped. Her mission is so clear in life, and it's Rick. That is so fun to play, because it does make her quite fearless."

Questioned over Mook dismissing Gaitok's feelings, Lalisa Manobal said "I think Mook was a little bit shocked and surprised... because I think she never thought they [would] end up in this situation. So she is a little bit shocked but, at the same time, she feels like maybe it could be a chance that she also has feelings towards Gaitok as well. [She's like] “we have never been on a date before, do you know what a date is?” And then everything starts to happen after that."

=== Casting ===
Ke Huy Quan has an uncredited voice cameo in the episode, voicing the character of Kenneth Nguyen.

== Reception ==
=== Viewers ===
In its original American broadcast, "Special Treatments" was seen by an estimated 0.687 million household viewers with a 0.16 in the 18-49 demographics. This means that 0.16 percent of all households with televisions watched the episode. This was a 63% increase from the previous episode, which was watched by 0.420 million household viewers with a 0.09 in the 18-49 demographics.

=== Critical reviews ===
"Special Treatments" received positive reviews from critics. The review aggregator website Rotten Tomatoes reported a 100% approval rating for the episode, based on 8 reviews, with an average rating of 7.3/10.

Manuel Betancourt of The A.V. Club gave the episode a "B" grade and wrote, "Resorts like these skirt the line between exoticism and authenticity, just as White's own camera threads that same one, coming at it from a decidedly cynical view of these characters and what they hope to find here."

Alan Sepinwall of Rolling Stone wrote, "So, yes, Victoria feels superior to anyone else she meets, but there's unsurprisingly a lot of that going around at the hotel, and in “Special Treatments.” Outside of that awkward reunion between Victoria and Kate, plus Gaitok's mistake briefly putting Chelsea in harm's way, the various character groups are pretty siloed off from one another this week." Proma Khosla of IndieWire gave the episode an "A–" grade and wrote, "Episode 2 digs into cracks — not necessarily in the relationship itself, but in the baggage that comes with being so close to another person. Chelsea knows Rick well enough to know that he's tightly wound and “a victim of [his] own decisions,” but so far, Rick remains reticent to share more with Chelsea."

Amanda Whiting of Vulture gave the episode a 3 star rating out of 5 and wrote, "This season is less funny than previous seasons of The White Lotus, and that's natural. A lot of the humor came not from the series' outlandishness but its directness, which is less hilarious now that we expect it. But this season is also darker. Its characters have come to the White Lotus not just with personal baggage weighing them down, but secrets." Erik Kain of Forbes wrote, "Not much happens in an hour, but so much happens... if you know what I mean. So much character development. So many little infiltrations into each of these people's lives and relationships. It's fascinating. And my goodness, the shots are all so beautiful."

Noel Murray of The New York Times wrote, "There are musicians, dancers and acrobats serving as mealtime entertainment, and bursts of flame rising from the table-side food prep. The characters, meanwhile, are still jet-lagged and coping with culture shock — not to mention a little tipsy. Everything is so overwhelming, surreal that even a sudden outburst of violence feels like a dream." Brady Langmann of Esquire wrote, "In all seriousness — even though I'm actually as serious as Patrick Schwarzenegger's bare ass — episode 2 does present a few more traditional suspects behind the inevitable murder this season. Remember, episode 1 makes it sound like there's a killer on the loose. They shoot multiple bullets, meaning that we may end up with multiple corpses at the end of season 3."

Yvonne Villareal of Los Angeles Times wrote, "The awkward interaction between Kate and Victoria at breakfast was so brilliant. Kate trying to make small talk by saying they met at a mutual friend's baby shower weekend and Victoria showing no interest in engaging with her felt like a crumb to something more, and I can't wait to find out what's the story there." Helena Hunt of The Ringer wrote, "In a year that kicked off with a movie that likens man to chimpanzee, it's not hard to jump to the conclusion that we might not be so different from our simian sibs after all. Maybe the guests will get closer to their spiritual sides during their stay — but it seems more likely that they'll start behaving more like animals as they clamber over one another for status, sex, and survival."
