= The White Lotus season 3 =

Season of television series

The White Lotus
- Season 3
- Promotional poster
- Showrunner: Mike White
- Starring: Leslie Bibb; Carrie Coon; Walton Goggins; Sarah Catherine Hook; Jason Isaacs; Lalisa Manobal; Michelle Monaghan; Sam Nivola; Lek Patravadi; Parker Posey; Natasha Rothwell; Patrick Schwarzenegger; Tayme Thapthimthong; Aimee Lou Wood; Jon Gries; Sam Rockwell; Scott Glenn
- No. of episodes: 8

Release
- Original network: HBO
- Original release: February 16 – April 6, 2025

Season chronology
- ← Previous; Season 2 Next → Season 4

The third season of The White Lotus, an American satirical comedy drama anthology television series, premiered on HBO on February 16, 2025. The season was greenlit in November 2022, and filmed in Bangkok, Phuket, and Ko Samui from February to August 2024. Series creator Mike White wrote and directed all eight episodes.

The season features an ensemble cast of Leslie Bibb, Carrie Coon, Scott Glenn, Walton Goggins, Sarah Catherine Hook, Jason Isaacs, Lalisa Manobal, Michelle Monaghan, Sam Nivola, Lek Patravadi, Parker Posey, Sam Rockwell, Patrick Schwarzenegger, Tayme Thapthimthong, and Aimee Lou Wood, with Natasha Rothwell and Jon Gries reprising their roles from seasons 1 and 2. The series follows the lives of the staff and wealthy guests at a wellness resort in Thailand.

The season received mostly positive reviews from critics, but some criticized the slow pacing and found the final episode disappointing. The season won one Primetime Emmy Award (for Outstanding Original Main Title Theme Music) out of ten nominations, and was nominated for six Golden Globe Awards, failing to win any.

== Cast and characters ==
=== Main ===
- Leslie Bibb as Kate Bohr, a country club wife from Austin, Texas, one of three longtime friends reuniting on a girls' trip
- Carrie Coon as Laurie Duffy, a corporate lawyer and recent divorcée from New York City, one of three longtime friends reuniting on a girls' trip
- Walton Goggins as Rick Hatchett, a rugged and mysterious man with a chip on his shoulder, traveling with his young girlfriend Chelsea
- Sarah Catherine Hook as Piper Ratliff, a college senior studying religion and the second child of Timothy and Victoria
- Jason Isaacs as Timothy Ratliff, a financier in jeopardy from Durham, North Carolina, vacationing with his wife, Victoria, and kids Saxon, Piper, and Lochlan
- Lalisa Manobal as Thidapon "Mook" Sornsin, a "health mentor" for White Lotus guests
- Michelle Monaghan as Jaclyn Lemon, a television actress based in Hollywood, one of three longtime friends reuniting on a girls' trip
- Sam Nivola as Lochlan Ratliff, a shy high school senior and Timothy and Victoria's youngest child
- Lek Patravadi as Sritala Hollinger, one of the owners of the White Lotus, who pioneered its health program
- Parker Posey as Victoria Ratliff, Timothy's wife and mother to Saxon, Piper, and Lochlan
- Natasha Rothwell as Belinda Lindsey, a spa manager from the White Lotus in Hawaii attending a work exchange. Rothwell reprises her role from season 1.
- Patrick Schwarzenegger as Saxon Ratliff, Timothy and Victoria's oldest child, who works for his father's company
- Tayme Thapthimthong as Gaitok, a security guard at the White Lotus
- Aimee Lou Wood as Chelsea, a free spirit from Manchester traveling with Rick, her older boyfriend
- Jon Gries as "Gary" / Greg Hunt, (Note: Gries is billed among the main cast from the second episode onwards. He is credited as guest starring in the first episode.) a man involved with Chloe and the widower of Tanya McQuoid. Gries reprises his role from seasons 1 and 2.
- Sam Rockwell as Frank, (Note: Rockwell is billed among the main cast from the sixth episode onwards. He is credited as guest starring in the fifth episode.) Rick's friend and former associate
- Scott Glenn as Jim Hollinger, (Note: Glenn is billed among the main cast from the seventh episode onwards. He is credited as guest starring in the sixth episode.) Sritala's American husband who has recently suffered a stroke

=== Recurring ===
- Nicholas Duvernay as Zion Lindsey, Belinda's college-aged son who is visiting her after finishing his business degree
- Arnas Fedaravicius as Valentin, a Russian health mentor for Jaclyn, Laurie, and Kate
- Christian Friedel as Fabian, the general manager of Thailand's The White Lotus
- Dom Hetrakul as Pornchai, the wellness expert at the White Lotus who is assigned to train Belinda
- Charlotte Le Bon as Chloe, a French Canadian expat who is Greg's current partner and befriends Chelsea
- Morgana O'Reilly as Pam, an Australian health mentor for the Ratliffs
- Shalini Peiris as Amrita, a meditation teacher and spiritual counselor at the White Lotus
- Julian Kostov as Aleksei, Valentin's friend
- Yuri Kolokolnikov as Vlad, Valentin's friend
- Suthichai Yoon as Luang Por Teera, the head of the local Buddhist monastery
- Yothin Udomsanti as Pee Lek, head of security at the White Lotus and Gaitok's supervisor

=== Guest ===
- Carl Boudreaux and Natalie Cole as two hotel guests
- Christian Hubicki as a hotel guest
- Ke Huy Quan as the voice of Kenneth "Kenny" Nguyen, Timothy's former business partner
- Scott Galloway as the voice of Chuck, Timothy's lawyer
- Rob Carlton as Rupert, Greg's friend, a middle-aged Australian man with a young Thai girlfriend
- Liddy Clark as Australian woman #1
- Wendy Strehlow as Australian woman #2
- Praya Lundberg as Praya, girlfriend of Rupert

== Episodes ==
No. overall	No. in season	Title	Directed by	Written by	Original release date	U.S. viewers (millions)
14	1	"Same Spirits, New Forms"	Mike White	Mike White	February 16, 2025	0.420
Zion, the son of White Lotus Maui spa manager Belinda, is joining his mother at the White Lotus in Ko Samui, Thailand, where she is visiting to learn from wellness manager Pornchai. He begins a session with the hotel's meditation counselor, Amrita, before being interrupted by gunfire nearby. While fleeing through a pond, Zion discovers a dead body. One week earlier, a group of guests arrive at the White Lotus. Middle-aged Rick arrives with his much younger British girlfriend Chelsea; Rick is upset to learn that Jim Hollinger, the husband of hotel owner Sritala, is not present. Wealthy businessman Timothy Ratliff arrives with his wife Victoria and their grown children Saxon, Piper, and Lochlan; Piper is doing research for her thesis about a local Buddhist monk. Timothy receives several calls from a journalist working on a story about illegal activity by his former business partner Kenny Nguyen. Jaclyn, a popular TV actress, arrives with her childhood friends Kate and Laurie. Security guard Gaitok flirts with health mentor Mook after giving her a ride to work. Left by Rick to drink at the bar alone, Chelsea befriends an ex-model, Chloe, whose boyfriend is Greg Hunt, Tanya McQuoid's widower.
15	2	"Special Treatments"	Mike White	Mike White	February 23, 2025	0.687
Kate and Jaclyn discuss Laurie's messy divorce and troubled daughter while Laurie is out of the room. Later, when Jaclyn is absent, Laurie gossips with Kate about Jaclyn's suspected narcissism and much younger husband. Jaclyn hears some of this from an adjacent room. At Chelsea's insistence, Rick attends a session with Amrita, and opens up slightly about his traumatic childhood. Gaitok reveals his true feelings to Mook, but she gently dismisses his advances. Later, while health mentor Valentin chats with Gaitok at the security gate, two men rob the hotel boutique. Belinda and Pornchai grow closer as they exchange massage techniques. Saxon comments on Piper's sex life to Lochlan; Lochlan repeats it to Piper, who becomes upset. Chelsea and Rick dine with Chloe and Greg, who is going by the name "Gary" and is evasive about his life. Timothy continues receiving calls from journalists about his involvement in money laundering and finally reaches Kenny, who believes he is certain to be arrested. A panicked Timothy calls for an appointment with his lawyer. After overhearing Sritala's plans to visit her husband in a Bangkok hospital, Rick tells Chelsea he must briefly visit Bangkok.
16	3	"The Meaning of Dreams"	Mike White	Mike White	March 2, 2025	0.507
Victoria wakes unsettled from a dream about walking toward a tsunami as Timothy takes a seemingly urgent call. When she shares her dream, Piper interprets it as a warning. Rick approaches Sritala, posing as a film producer offering her a role. Lochlan attends a posture correction session, where the therapist asks if he struggles with assertiveness due to his dominant family members. Jim's guards humiliate Gaitok, implying he is incompetent and saying that resort manager Fabian wants him fired. Gaitok's supervisor, Lek, reprimands him for his carelessness; Mook pushes him to ask for a promotion. Intoxicated, Rick impulsively frees snakes from a terrarium at a nearby snake show; Chelsea is bitten and rushed to the hospital. Piper visits the monastery of the monk her thesis is allegedly about. Victoria, noticing Timothy's stress, gives him lorazepam, causing him to nap throughout the day. Timothy later steals more lorazepam to sleep at night. Belinda recognizes Greg and approaches him at dinner, asking after Tanya; he denies knowledge of her. After implying that she and her husband voted for Donald Trump, Kate later watches Jaclyn and Laurie laugh and gossip about her marriage and political views.
17	4	"Hide or Seek"	Mike White	Mike White	March 9, 2025	0.677
Fabian ramps up security at the resort by giving Gaitok a gun. Mook interprets this as a step toward promotion and becomes more receptive to Gaitok’s advances. Chloe invites the Ratliffs, Rick, and Chelsea to a social gathering on Greg's yacht. Chelsea confronts Rick about his upcoming trip to Bangkok and his emotional disconnection from her; he tells her that Sritala's husband allegedly murdered his father and he plans to confront him. Piper tells Lochlan that she lied about her thesis and intends to stay at the monastery for a year after graduation. Kate, Laurie, and Jaclyn go to a nearby resort on Valentin's suggestion but find it filled with retirees and leave. They demand Valentin take them out. Their day in town is interrupted by a Songkran water festival, but they later meet up with Valentin and his friends at a club. Timothy calls his lawyer, who tells him that Kenny has cooperated with the investigation, that Timothy will likely face a prison sentence, and that his assets are frozen. He steals the gun from Gaitok's unattended security booth. Belinda discovers that Greg fled from questioning after Tanya's death in Sicily. Greg investigates Belinda's Instagram account.
18	5	"Full-Moon Party"	Mike White	Mike White	March 16, 2025	0.828
Piper shocks her parents by telling them she intends to stay in Thailand after graduation. Gaitok discovers Timothy stole the gun, but Timothy denies it when confronted. Timothy contemplates suicide. Chloe, Chelsea, Saxon, and Lochlan attend a Full Moon Party; Chloe procures molly for the group. Fabian tells Belinda that Greg has been asking questions about her, but when Belinda tells him Greg is hiding from authorities, he refuses to call the police. Belinda confides in Pornchai and the two sleep together. In Bangkok, Rick meets with his friend Frank, who gives him a gun. Frank tells Rick about his sexual exploits in Thailand, which led to his conversion to Buddhism. Jaclyn, Kate, and Laurie go clubbing with Valentin and his friends Alexei and Vlad. Later, at the hotel, Jaclyn has sex with Valentin despite having earlier urged Laurie to do so. After the party, back on Greg's yacht and high on molly, Chloe initiates a kissing game, leading to an incestuous kiss between Saxon and Lochlan. Timothy prepares to kill himself with the gun but is interrupted by Victoria, who advises him to go back to bed.
19	6	"Denials"	Mike White	Mike White	March 23, 2025	0.744
Belinda is surprised when Zion arrives early and catches her in bed with Pornchai. Later that day, Pornchai tells Belinda that he is interested in opening a spa with her in Thailand. Greg suspects that Chloe had sex with either Saxon or Lochlan, and tells her to invite the boys to a dinner party; he also invites Belinda, who is alarmed about his intentions. Kate spots Valentin leaving Jaclyn's bedroom and tells Laurie, who scorns Jaclyn's behavior as deceitful and consistent with her old ways. Piper brings her family to the monastery to assess its legitimacy. Timothy has a conversation with the lama about death, which moves him; he approves Piper's stay at the monastery, to Victoria's horror. Lochlan joins Piper for a night at the monastery; he and Saxon separately remember that they had an incestuous threesome with Chloe the previous night while intoxicated. While the Ratliffs are away, Gaitok recovers his gun from their villa. Timothy contemplates a murder-suicide of his family to spare them financial ruin. Rick persuades Sritala to invite him and Frank (posing as a film director) to her house in Bangkok, where he finally meets Jim Hollinger.
20	7	"Killer Instincts"	Mike White	Mike White	March 30, 2025	0.956
While Frank chats with Sritala, Rick confronts Jim privately, threatening him with a gun, but abandons his revenge and instead has a night out with Frank. Saxon notices his father's strange behavior and asks if anything is wrong at work, noting that his identity is tied to his father's success, but Timothy dismisses his concerns. Greg offers Belinda $100,000 for her silence on his whereabouts; Belinda does not accept the offer, although Zion urges her to. Laurie has an argument with Jaclyn and Kate, and leaves to attend a Muay Thai fight at Bangla Boxing Stadium with Valentin. She later has sex with Aleksei, who attempts to con her out of $10,000; when they are interrupted by Aleksei's girlfriend, Laurie flees. Mook, on a date with Gaitok, is disappointed by his aversion to violence. Gaitok later recognizes Valentin's friends as the boutique robbers. Piper is dismayed when Lochlan says he wants to join her at the monastery. Saxon rejects an invitation from Chloe to fulfill Greg's cuckoldry fetish. Chelsea attempts to teach Saxon to meditate, but sends him away after he comes on to her. Timothy fantasizes about killing Victoria, Saxon, and himself, but finds the gun is missing.
21	8	"Amor Fati"	Mike White	Mike White	April 6, 2025	1.370
Piper tells her parents she cannot tolerate living without material comforts, relieving Victoria. Valentin begs Gaitok not to report him and his friends for the robbery lest they be deported. Zion negotiates a payout from Greg of $5 million; Belinda decides to leave Thailand, to Pornchai's dismay. Laurie reconciles with Jaclyn and Kate. Lochlan tells Saxon that their sexual contact during the threesome was because he is "a pleaser". Timothy nearly kills himself and his family (except Lochlan) with poisoned piña coladas, but stops them from drinking at the last minute; Lochlan drinks the leftovers from the blender the next morning and nearly dies before awakening in Timothy's arms. Jim confronts Rick at the hotel, insulting Rick's mother; spiraling, Rick begs for another session with Amrita, but she is busy seeing Zion. Rick shoots Jim dead with Jim's gun. Sritala reveals that Jim was Rick's father. Chelsea is killed in a shootout with Sritala's bodyguards, devastating Rick. Gaitok obeys Sritala's order to shoot Rick dead. Later, Timothy tells his family their lives are about to change; Gaitok is promoted to Sritala's bodyguard, to Mook's delight; and Belinda and Zion wave goodbye to the White Lotus staff.

== Production ==
=== Development ===
On November 18, 2022, preceding the premiere of the second season, HBO renewed The White Lotus for a third season. Following the second-season finale, series creator Mike White hinted that it would be set in Asia and invoke a "satirical and funny look at death and Eastern religion and spirituality", similar to how the first season focused on money and the second season on sex.

According to executive producer Mark Kamine, White decided at the outset that the third season would explore Eastern philosophy, so the original list of candidate locations included Bali, Japan, Korea, the Philippines, Sri Lanka and Thailand. Through various discussions and research, the list was narrowed to Japan and Thailand, and then Kamine, White, "and others" took research trips to both countries.

On one of those trips, White contracted bronchitis and was given a steroid nebulizer. While recovering, "he found himself imagining a group of Westerners who descend on Thailand in search of spiritual revival". The art seen in the opening credits was inspired by murals in Wat Suthat, one of the temples visited by the producers.

White scouted locations in other Thailand destinations but initially refused to visit Ko Samui. He had bad memories of the island, having stayed there twice before when he competed on The Amazing Race and the island was used as the show's elimination station. Since the first two seasons of The White Lotus had already been filmed at Four Seasons resorts, another producer went to scout the Four Seasons resort on the island, and eventually White was persuaded to give it a chance.

The third season's production was disrupted by the 2023 Writers Guild of America strike, resulting in the release being pushed to 2025.

=== Casting ===
Upon the third-season renewal announcement, producers confirmed that there would be a new cast of characters in another White Lotus resort. In April 2023, Natasha Rothwell was reported to be reprising her role as Belinda for the series' third season. In January 2024, it was announced that Leslie Bibb, Jason Isaacs, Michelle Monaghan, Parker Posey, Dom Hetrakul, Tayme Thapthimthong, Carrie Coon, Miloš Biković, Christian Friedel, Morgana O'Reilly, Lek Patravadi, Shalini Peiris, Walton Goggins, Sarah Catherine Hook, Sam Nivola, Patrick Schwarzenegger, Aimee Lou Wood, Francesca Corney, Nicholas Duvernay, and Arnas Fedaravičius had joined the cast. Biković's casting was criticized by Ukraine's Ministry of Foreign Affairs over his alleged support for Russia's invasion of the country; he was dropped from the cast on February 2, and replaced by Julian Kostov, who appeared in a recurring capacity. In February 2024, Scott Glenn and Lalisa Manobal were cast in the season. In March 2024, Charlotte Le Bon joined the cast several weeks after shooting began to replace Corney after it became apparent that Corney was "quite petite and just going to play too young", according to casting director Meredith Tucker. The return of Jon Gries (reprising his role from seasons 1 and 2) was kept unannounced until the first episode aired. Woody Harrelson was set to play Frank, but scheduling conflicts meant he had to drop out; the part went to Sam Rockwell and was kept unannounced until March 16, 2025, when the fifth episode aired.

Wood later revealed that Chelsea was originally written as an American. During her audition, she was asked to use an American accent and her natural Mancunian accent, and White liked the latter so much that he rewrote Chelsea around Wood's accent.

=== Filming ===
In March 2023, Variety reported that filming for the third season was likely to take place at one of Thailand's Four Seasons hotels. White scouted Honshu, Japan, but Thailand was chosen because the series received a $4.4 million tax incentive for filming there (Japan has no film-incentive system). Principal photography began in February 2024 with locations including Bangkok, Phuket, and Ko Samui, and wrapped in August.

The White Lotus resort in the show is a composite of scenes shot at the Four Seasons Resort in Ko Samui and scenes shot at several other resorts around that island and Phuket. The main effect the producers were looking for was common spaces that looked "beautiful" and had "real impact". The Four Seasons was used for its villas, common areas, paths, swimming pool, and fitness areas, and was the site of all breakfast and lunch scenes. The resort's restaurant was too dark at night for filming dinners, while its reception area was designed to stun arriving guests with the view from the resort's hillside location but was not properly designed for filming scenes of guests checking into a luxury resort. Accordingly, dinner scenes were filmed at a restaurant at the Rosewood Phuket. The cast and crew worked through the night at the Rosewood to shoot all the evening dining scenes and ended their workday with a group breakfast. Reception area scenes were filmed at the Anantara Mai Khao Phuket, along with the spa scenes. The security station, driveway, and jewelry store scenes were filmed at the Anantara Bophut Koh Samui. Frank's wild monologue to Rick was filmed at the Mandarin Oriental, Bangkok.

The four resorts that appear as the White Lotus differ significantly from their fictional counterpart in that they have no sandbar nearby and are all monkey-free, but the birds and monitor lizard were authentic, since the Anantara Mai Khao is inside a nature preserve.

One of the biggest obstacles the cast and crew encountered was Thailand's tropical heat. Air conditioning was too noisy to be used while cameras were rolling; the cast had to do their best "to look as if they're having a good time", but in fact could "barely function".

As a late addition to the cast, Rockwell filmed his scenes in one week during a break from shooting Good Luck, Have Fun, Don't Die in South Africa.

The Muay Thai fight scene was filmed at Bangla Boxing Stadium in Phuket.

=== Post-production ===
The third season qualified for a $550,000 tax credit from the government of Hawaii, because HBO assigned the post-production work to an eight-person team that worked out of a timeshare unit on Kauai. An improvised editing bay was set up in the unit, which was across the street from White's house on Kauai.

== Release ==
The third season premiered on February 16, 2025, on HBO, with the eighth and final episode released on April 6, 2025.

The third season was the first season for which Four Seasons Hotels and Resorts openly promoted its connection to the show (all three seasons were shot at Four Seasons resorts). In the lead-up to the season finale on April 6, 2025, the joint promotion culminated in the temporary transformation of the Four Seasons Westlake Village into a White Lotus resort, a screening of the season finale in the ballroom with many of the cast members, and a panel discussion moderated by Tan France.

== Reception ==
=== Critical response ===
On the review aggregator website Rotten Tomatoes, 86% of 181 critics' reviews are favorable, with an average rating of 7.7/10. The website's consensus reads, "Darker and more patient with its storytelling than previous seasons while brandishing a superb new ensemble full of acidic performances, The White Lotus' third season offers a spiritual respite that shivs the soul." Metacritic, which uses a weighted average, assigned a score of 77 out of 100, based on 46 critic reviews, indicating "generally favorable" reviews.

On RogerEbert.com, Brian Tallerico said season three "will likely be the most visually striking drama you watch this year. White takes full advantage of his setting in a manner that brings it to life in ways that even the last two gorgeous settings didn't produce. The way he constructs his episodes, not just narratively but visually, is arguably without peer on TV right now. He somehow finds a way to capture the opulence and beauty of Thailand while never losing the realism of the stories he's telling there. It's a balancing act between the beauty and the humanity. Of course, the show really comes to life where they intersect." In IndieWire, Ben Travers gave the season a grade of "A-", saying it "smashes each character's flimsy values in ways both hilarious and harrowing. They cannot outrun their pain, but in White's transfixing, exacting new season, their pain can still become our pleasure". With its spiritual themes, some critics likened the season to White's previous series, Enlightened.

The cast received widespread acclaim. In The Washington Post, Lili Loofbourow said, "It's fascinating to watch Goggins in particular—who's usually such a scamp—in this subdued mode". She added, "Coon is of course extraordinary, Monaghan is messy and bold and Bibb excels at projecting a rigid, pleasant diplomacy that gets increasingly brittle as the season unfolds. That old 'White Lotus' magic comes back full force in every scene these three share…Each conversation nudges the obvious tensions forward just a tad. It's propulsive. It's believable. It's very, very funny."

Some critics noted the season gets off to a slower start. But Alison Herman of Variety wrote, "when the story coalesces and kicks into gear somewhere around its halfway point, it's as wild and unpredictable as any of the powder kegs White has combusted". In Entertainment Weekly, Kristen Baldwin gave the season a grade of "B" and said "The White Lotus still works. Even when the storytelling lags, it's still impossible to check out early."

Richard Lawson of Vanity Fair wrote that White "makes effective use of ominous dreams and portents, letting the spiritual murmur in the air of this lavish jungle compound eerily inform the story. The season is about a sickness of the soul—or, perhaps, the sickness of not having a soul at all." He added this "round of episodes is gloomier than seasons one and two, though still sharp and intriguing where it counts". Of the new characters, Lawson said he found the trio of girlfriends to be the "dishiest and most fun", with "shiveringly credible dialogue delivered with natural flair by the actors".

More critical reviews found that the show was returning to familiar territory and themes of previous seasons instead of covering new ground. Lawson wrote, "It's all interesting, but the sense of tight control and inventiveness that made the previous two seasons such wonders is not quite there", adding that the season relies "on perhaps a few too many clichés as [White] struggles to come up with new things for curdled rich people to do". Kathryn VanArendonk of Vulture wrote, "It's fun when The White Lotus reconsiders itself in structural ways, but at other points there's something anxious about how the series wants to wrestle with its previous obsessions, or continue to ignore its repeated blindspots, like pressing on a bruise to make sure it's still there." In The New Yorker, Inkoo Kang wrote, "The season as a whole feels trapped between tones: not quite dark enough to confront what happens in a country where foreigners can buy nearly anything they want for the right price, nor frothy enough to simply showcase the baroque weirdness of the wealthy." The season finale was also criticized, with some reviewers finding it to be a disappointing ending to the season.

Many critics felt the native characters of color had less depth than the white characters. VanArendonk wrote, "As various season-three characters seek enlightenment or escape, they recreate the season-one dynamic where white characters are full of fascinating, absorbing peculiarities, while the non-white hotel staff are one-note ciphers, destined to keep the plot moving but not have interiority or complex emotional lives." Mel Wang of Rolling Stone Philippines praised Thai actors Manobal, Thapthimthong, and Hetrakul's performances, but said that "good acting isn't enough to save half-baked character arcs." They further criticized the Thai characters' story arcs for "merely act[ing] as vehicles to drive the storylines of the show's American protagonists", lamenting Gaitok (Thapthimthong)'s "wasted" storyline in particular.

=== Audience viewership and response ===
The third season is the most-watched season of The White Lotus, averaging more than 5 million more viewers than season 2, which had an average of 15.5 million viewers. The eighth and final episode of the season was the most-watched episode of the series, at 6.2 million viewers across its linear airings on HBO and streaming viewership on Max. The season premiere had 2.4 million viewers, episodes 3 and 4 had 3.4 million, episode 5 had 4.2 million, and episode 7 had 4.8 million. Viewership for episodes 2 and 5 was not released.

Ko Samui, the shooting location of the third season, experienced a 65% increase in hotel bookings and reservations since its premiere.

=== Accolades ===
The third season received 10 nominations at the 77th Primetime Emmy Awards and 13 nominations at the 77th Primetime Creative Arts Emmy Awards. It was nominated for Outstanding Drama Series, and received several acting nominations, including Walton Goggins, Jason Isaacs, and Sam Rockwell for Outstanding Supporting Actor in a Drama Series; Carrie Coon, Parker Posey, Natasha Rothwell, and Aimee Lou Wood for Outstanding Supporting Actress in a Drama Series; and Scott Glenn for Outstanding Guest Actor in a Drama Series. Mike White was nominated for Outstanding Directing (for the episode "Amor Fati") and Outstanding Writing (for "Full-Moon Party"). The series' only win at the Emmys was for Outstanding Original Main Title Theme Music composed by Cristobal Tapia de Veer.

The season was nominated for six awards at the 83rd Golden Globe Awards, making it the most-nominated TV series. Nominations included, Best Television Series – Drama, Walton Goggins and Jason Isaacs for Best Supporting Actor on Television, and Carrie Coon, Parker Posey, and Aimee Lou Wood for Best Supporting Actress on Television.
