= Arrivederci (The White Lotus) =

- The White Lotus episode
- Episode no.: Season 2 Episode 7
- Directed by: Mike White
- Written by: Mike White
- Cinematography by: Xavier Grobet
- Editing by: John M. Valerio
- Original release date: December 11, 2022
- Running time: 74 minutes

Guest appearances
- Federico Scribani Rossi as Giuseppe; Eleonora Romandini as Isabella; Federico Ferrante as Rocco; Paolo Camilli as Hugo; Bruno Gouery as Didier; Francesco Zecca as Matteo

Episode chronology
← Previous "Abductions"	Next → "Same Spirits, New Forms"
- The White Lotus season 2

"Arrivederci" (Italian for 'Goodbye') is the seventh and final episode of the second season of the American black comedy drama anthology television series The White Lotus. It is the thirteenth overall episode of the series and was written and directed by series creator Mike White. It originally aired on HBO on December 11, 2022.

The series follows the guests and employees of the fictional White Lotus resort chain. The season is set on Taormina, Sicily, and follows the new guests, which include Ethan and his wife Harper; Cameron and his wife Daphne; Bert, his son Dominic, and grandson Albie; and Tanya and her husband Greg. The season explores the characters' conflicts, along with the short-tempered manager Valentina. In the episode, Tanya feels her life in danger when she suspects Quentin's plans, while the Spillers and Sullivans confront their own marriages.

According to Nielsen Media Research, the episode was seen by an estimated 0.854 million household viewers and gained a 0.19 ratings share among adults aged 18–49. The episode received critical acclaim, with critics praising the dark humor, performances (particularly Jennifer Coolidge), directing and closure to the storyline.

== Plot ==
After having sex, Albie (Adam DiMarco) suggests Lucia (Simona Tabasco) return with him to Los Angeles. She states she still owes money to Alessio, so Albie asks Dominic (Michael Imperioli) for the €50,000 she claims she owes. Dominic initially refuses and tells Albie that Lucia is clearly playing him, which Albie says is likely true but suggests that Dominic should still pay as a "karmic payment" for his years of womanizing. Albie promises to appeal to his mother on Dominic's behalf if he agrees to pay, so Dominic gives him the money.

Ethan (Will Sharpe) confronts Harper (Aubrey Plaza), as he suspects she cheated on him with Cameron (Theo James). She admits that Cameron kissed her, but claims she was never attracted to him. Ethan confronts Cameron at the beach, punching him and trying to drown him. He is stopped when bystanders intervene.

At Quentin's palazzo in Palermo, Tanya (Jennifer Coolidge) takes a second look at the photo she had seen of a younger Quentin (Tom Hollander) with a man who resembles her husband, Greg. Quentin states this photo is of his ex-boyfriend "Steve", and they depart on his yacht to return to Taormina.

Portia (Haley Lu Richardson) wakes to find her phone missing, and finds Jack (Leo Woodall) increasingly suspicious, after Jack refers to Portia as his "job". She manages to call Tanya from Jack's phone, telling her she's frightened. Tanya tells her that she saw Quentin having sex with Jack and about the picture she found at Quentin's house, deducing Greg and Quentin are plotting to kill Tanya and use her money to continue financing Quentin's lavish lifestyle.

Portia confronts Jack about his lies and his sexual relationship with Quentin. Jack tells her he's going to drive her back to Taormina, but instead drives her to Catania–Fontanarossa Airport and tells her not to return to Taormina for her own safety, tossing her cell phone out of the car as he drives away.

Giuseppe (Federico Scribani Rossi) returns from the hospital, but Valentina (Sabrina Impacciatore) appoints Mia (Beatrice Grannò) as the resort's new pianist and singer, firing Giuseppe. Mia tells Valentina she enjoyed their evening together, but suggests she find a girlfriend, adding that she can introduce her to some new people and places. Valentina happily agrees.

Ethan runs into Daphne (Meghann Fahy) at the beach, explaining that he suspects Harper and Cameron had an affair. Daphne initially looks perturbed but then tells him that he can choose not to be a victim. She leads him to an isolated area. Albie informs Lucia her debt is paid. That night, as Mount Etna erupts, Ethan & Harper and Albie & Lucia have passionate sex. Dominic calls his wife and she answers. She tells him to call her when he is back in town.

On Quentin's yacht, Tanya begins to panic after she is told Niccolo will be taking her back to shore in a dinghy. She locks herself in Niccolo's bedroom and searches his bag, finding a rope, duct tape and a gun, seeming to confirm her suspicions. When Niccolo forces the door, Tanya takes the gun and kills him, Quentin, and most of his friends. The ship's terrified captain Tommaso flees, leaving Tanya alone on the boat with no way to steer it to shore. She tries to board the dinghy, only to slip and hit her head, causing her to fall into the sea unconscious and drown.

The next morning, Lucia abandons Albie in his room while he sleeps. While swimming, Daphne encounters Tanya's corpse. The authorities retrieve her body, as well as the bodies found on the yacht. At the airport, the Spillers and Sullivans await their flight home. Ethan and Harper are considerably more affectionate with each other. A disguised Portia runs into Albie as they wait for their flights home. Portia says that Tanya isn't answering her phone. Albie mentions a guest was found drowned and several bodies were found on a yacht and Portia seems to realize the dead were Tanya, Quentin, and his group. Portia and Albie exchange phone numbers. In Taormina, Lucia and Mia joyfully walk down the street and greet the hotel employee who posed as Lucia's pimp, celebrating their successful scam.

== Production ==
=== Development ===
The episode was written and directed by series creator Mike White. This was White's thirteenth writing and directorial credit for the series.

=== Writing ===
White explained his decision behind killing Tanya: "I love her as a character and obviously love Jennifer, but I just felt like we're going to Italy, [and] she's such a diva, a larger-than-life female archetype. It just felt like we could devise our own operatic conclusion to Tanya's life and her story." White didn't want Tanya to die at the hands of someone else, so she was given a death after successfully fending off her attackers, explaining that "it just felt like that's so Tanya."

Describing the end for the Di Grassos, White said, "you see three generations of men and there's this attractive woman who crosses. They all sort of gawk at her and my hope is that Dominic does change, so there is a little bit in the texture of it that their relationship with women is going to always be fraught with the sexual desire."

== Reception ==
=== Viewers ===
In its original American broadcast, "Arrivederci" was seen by an estimated 0.854 million household viewers with a 0.19 in the 18-49 demographics. This means that 0.11 percent of all households with televisions watched the episode. This was a 24% increase from the previous episode, which was watched by 0.684 million household viewers with a 0.10 in the 18-49 demographics.

=== Critical reviews ===
"Arrivederci" received critical acclaim. The review aggregator website Rotten Tomatoes reported an 100% approval rating for the episode, based on 20 reviews. The site's consensus states: "Punctuated by absurd tragedy and a series of perverse happy endings, 'Arrivederci' brings The White Lotus' stay in Sicily to an ingeniously bittersweet close."

Manuel Betancourt of The A.V. Club gave the episode a "B+" grade and wrote, "Season two of The White Lotus had flirted with being an opera, so it made sense that Tanya was the one who had to die at the end. Yes, Twitter is likely already rioting as I type this. And yes, we'll all miss our favorite Emmy-winning star. But, when you think about it, this was arguably what Mike White needed to do if he was going to turn this anthology into must-see TV when it comes back for a third season. Better to let Jennifer Coolidge's Tanya go out with a bang than have us suffer through another season in which her charms would've, perhaps, begun to grow a tad old."

Alan Sepinwall of Rolling Stone wrote, "It's a satisfying inversion of how Season One functioned, and arguably a necessary one, as it would be hard to imagine coming back to this show year after year if it was always going to be about the guests blithely ruining the lives of the poorer people around them." Tom Smyth of Vulture gave the episode a perfect 5 star rating out of 5 and wrote, "Finally, after weeks of speculation and theorizing, we know exactly whose body Daphne bumped into on the last swim of her Sicilian vacation. We had to say farewell to our sole holdover from season one: Jennifer Coolidge's Tanya McQuoid. But since this is The White Lotus, her death was, of course, anything but straightforward. And because of the endlessly expanding web that Mike White weaved over the last six episodes, that was just one of the many loose ends that this finale was tasked with tying up."

Shawn Laib of Den of Geek gave the episode a 4.5 star rating out of 5 and wrote, "Much like the end of the first season, it can be surmised that none of these people learned any sort of lesson. The subtext that is required to fully enjoy the themes and issues of the second season may or may not be for everyone’s tastes. There is one item that requires no interpreting, though: The White Lotus is a hell of a ride, and we can't wait for the next group of rich misfits to arrive at the hotel chain!" Paul Dailly of TV Fanatic gave the episode a 3.75 star rating out of 5 and wrote, "Overall, 'Arrivederci' wasn't as satisfying as expected, but it was still an excellent hour of television."

=== Accolades ===
TVLine named Jennifer Coolidge as the "Performer of the Week" for the week of December 7, 2022, for her performance in the episode. The site wrote, "We were honestly stunned to see Mike White kill off Coolidge's delightfully daffy socialite Tanya McQuoid in the Season 2 finale of HBO's hit dramedy, just because she's been the main attraction of the past two seasons. But at least Coolidge went out in style, giving Tanya a surprisingly resilient yet hopelessly inept swan song."
