= Christian Friedel =

German actor and singer (born 1979)

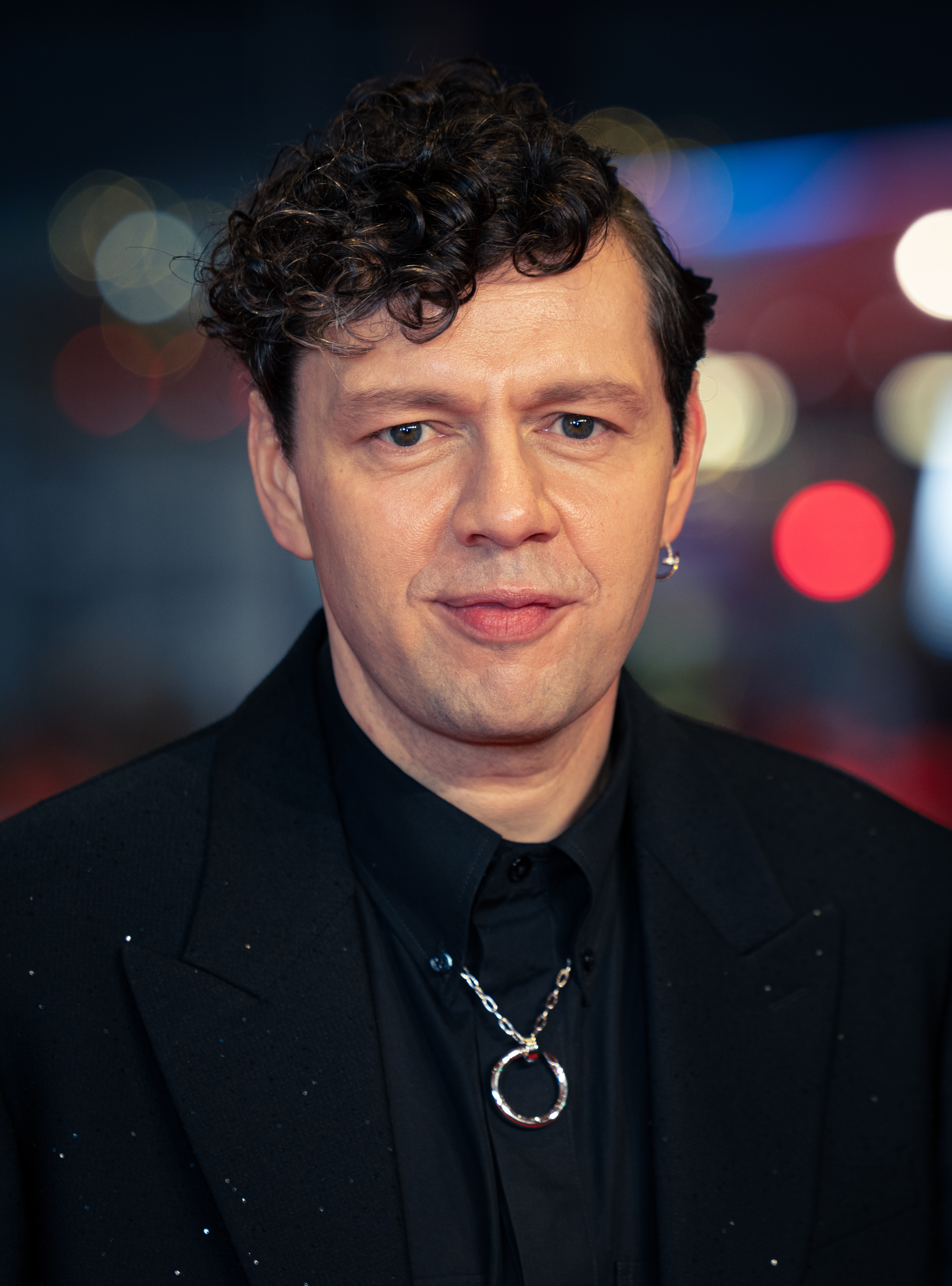
- Friedel at the 75th Berlin International Film Festival in 2025
- Born: 9 March 1979 (age 47); Magdeburg, East Germany
- Occupations: Actor, singer
- Years active: 2009–present

Christian Friedel (born 9 March 1979) is a German actor and singer. Having acted in a number of German language productions, he is best known internationally as the teacher in Michael Haneke's The White Ribbon (2009), as part of the main cast of the Netflix television thriller series Babylon Berlin (2017–present), as Rudolf Höss in the 2023 drama The Zone of Interest, and as Fabian in season three of the anthology series The White Lotus (2025).

== Career ==
=== Film and television ===
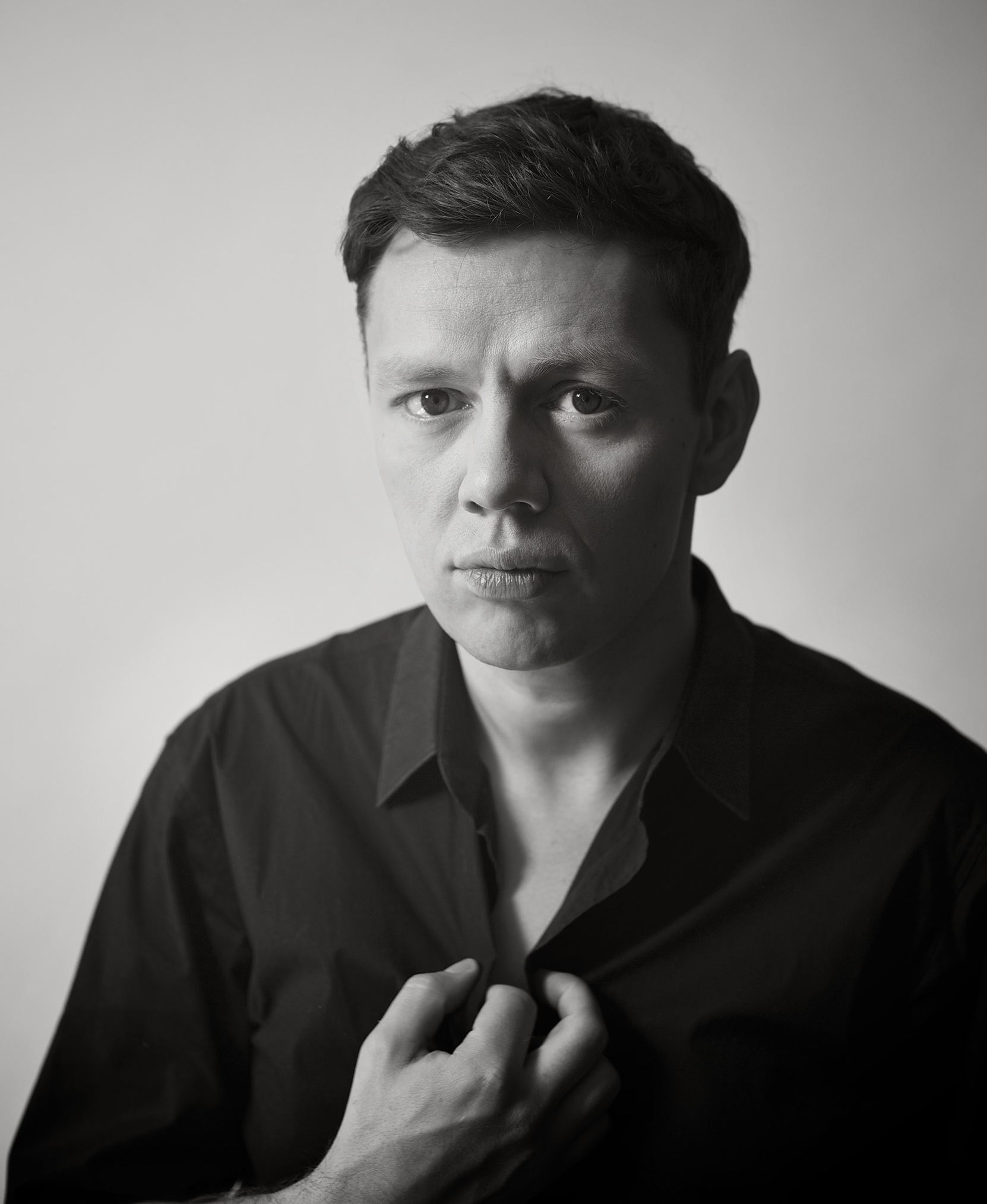
Christian Friedel photographed by Oliver Mark, Berlin 2015

Friedel has appeared in films and television series since 2009 including Michael Haneke's The White Ribbon, and Oliver Hirschbiegel's 13 Minutes, where he portrayed Georg Elser. More recently, he played police photographer Gräf in the esteemed drama series Babylon Berlin, and was a main character in the German mini-series Perfume. He also portrayed Rudolf Höss in Jonathan Glazer’s The Zone of Interest after previously turning down offers to play Nazi roles.

=== Stage ===
After studying acting at Otto Falckenberg School of the Performing Arts in Munich, Friedel acted in the German theatre companies of Bayerisches Staatsschauspiel, Munich Kammerspiele and Schauspiel Hannover.

Since its 2009–2010 season, Friedel has been part of the company at Staatsschauspiel Dresden, and has acted in title roles such as Schiller's Don Carlos and Shakespeare's Hamlet.

In Spring 2017, Friedel played the role of Nathanael in a stage adaptation of E. T. A. Hoffmann's The Sandman by Robert Wilson at the Düsseldorfer Schauspielhaus.

=== Music ===
In June 2011, Friedel and four members of the German band Polarkreis 18 formed the band Woods of Birnam.

== Personal life ==
Friedel lives in Dresden.

== Filmography ==
=== Film ===
Year	Title	Role	Notes
2009	The White Ribbon	Teacher	
2011	Chicken with Plums	Cyrus	
2012	Russian Disco	Andrej	
2012	Closed Season	Albert	
2013	Erbgut	Max	
2014	Amour Fou	Heinrich von Kleist	
2015	13 Minutes	Georg Elser	Nominated – European Film Award for Best Actor; Nominated – German Film Award for Best Actor
2018	Angelo	Curator	
2018	Glück ist was für Weicheier	Dr. Wolfgang Teuter	
2021	Bekenntnisse des Hochstaplers Felix Krull	Konic Von Portugal	
2023	The Zone of Interest	Rudolf Höss	Montclair Film Festival Breakthrough Performer Award; Nominated – European Film Award for Best Actor; Nominated – Astra Film Award for Best International Actor
2023	15 Years	Harry Mangold	Nominated – German Film Award for Best Supporting Actor
TBA	The Idiots	TBA	Post-production

=== Television ===
Year	Title	Role	Notes
2014	The Chosen Ones	Manfred Wolf	TV movie
2015	Polizeiruf 110	Max Schwarz	1 episode
2016	Rivals Forever: The Sneaker Battle	Adolf Dassler	Miniseries
2017	Sugar Sand	Günter Ernst	TV movie
2017–present	Babylon Berlin	Gräf	Main cast; 40 episodes
2018	Parfum	Daniel "Zahnlos" Sluiter	Main cast; 6 episodes
2021	Tatort	Various	2 episodes
2024	Kafka	Franz Werfel	4 episodes
2025	The White Lotus	Fabian	Recurring role, Season 3
