= Dom Hetrakul =

Thai actor and model

- ดอม เหตระกูล
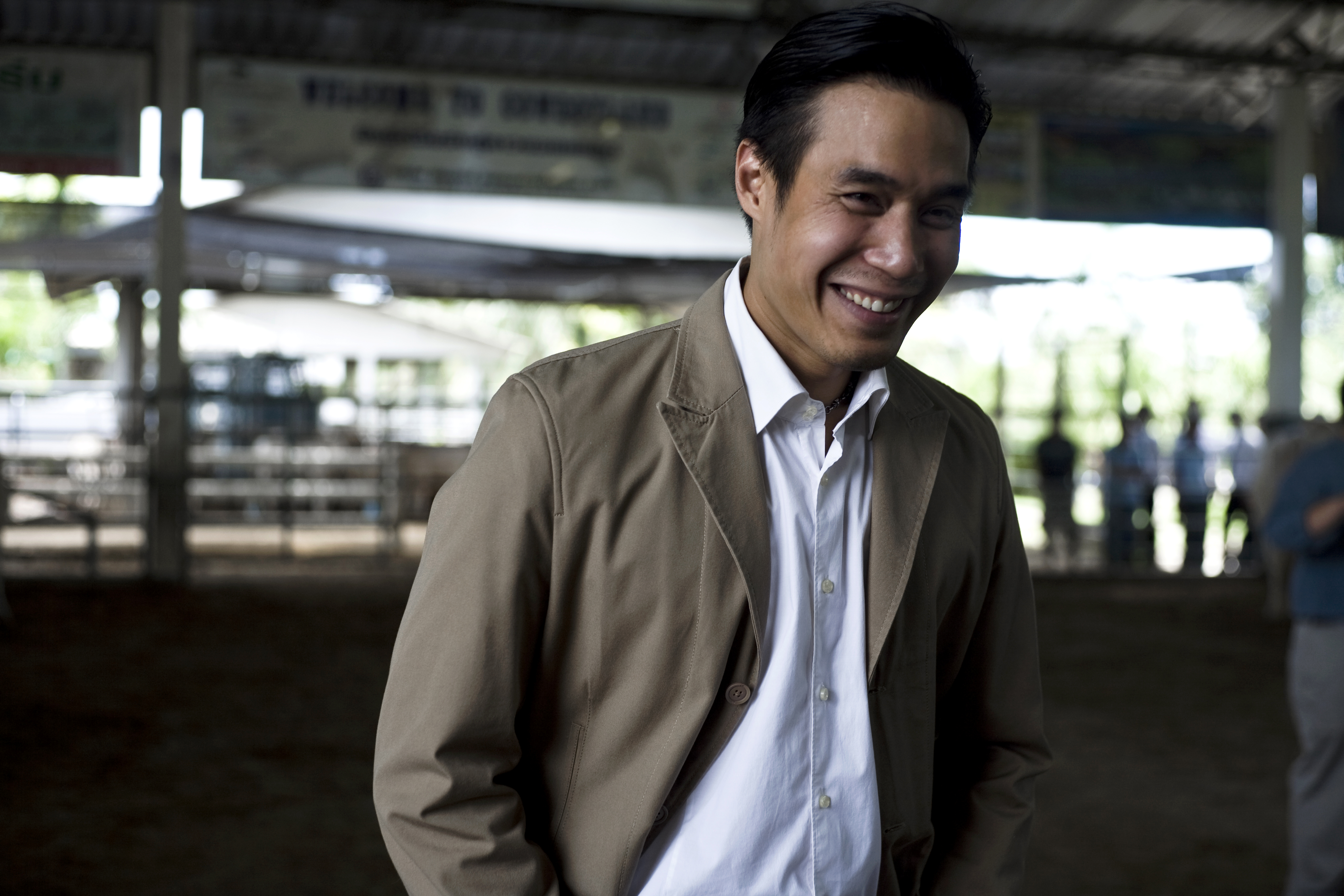
- Hetrakul in 2009
- Born: April 9, 1976 (age 50); Bangkok, Thailand
- Occupations: Actor; Business owner
- Years active: 1995–present
- Known for: Siamese Outlaws; Bangkok Dangerous; The Outrage; The Marine 2; The White Lotus
- Height: 1.85 m (6 ft 1 in)
- Spouse: Sasilax Faichampa
- Children: 1

Dom Hetrakul (Thai: ดอม เหตระกูล; RTGS: Dom Hetrakun, born April 9, 1976 in Bangkok, Thailand), is an actor known for his appearances in many Thai TV shows and films. He has also starred in Hollywood productions, with a frequent presence in martial arts sagas.

== Biography ==
Dom Hetrakul is a member of the family that has run the Daily News, Thai newspaper, for nearly 50 years. He is the managing director of Britbike, the authorized distributor of Triumph motorcycles from the United Kingdom.

== Filmography ==
=== Films ===
Year	Title	Role	Notes	Notes#2
1998	Crime King	Captain Yotying Suwankhiri	Lead Role	Thailand
1999	Extra Legal	Kongkiat	Lead Role	Thailand
1999	Beyond Forgiving	Lop Lamnaral	Lead Role	Thailand
2004	Siamese Outlaws	Thief White	Guest Role	Thailand
2004	Sniper 3	Chu	Supporting Role	Hollywood
2005	Vampires: The Turning	Niran	Supporting Role	Hollywood
2005	The King Maker	Thong	Supporting Role	Thailand, Hollywood
2005	Mysterious Island	Sun	Supporting Role	USA
2008	Bangkok Dangerous	Aran	Supporting Role	Hollywood
2008	Sunny and the Elephant	Sing	Supporting Role	France
2009	Bangkok Adrenaline	Lek	Supporting Role	Thailand
2011	Rebirth	Pichai	Supporting Role	France, Thailand
2011	The Outrage	Thief	Lead Role	Thailand
2011	King Naresuan 3	Prince Hanfa	Supporting Role	Thailand
2011	King Naresuan 4	Prince Hanfa	Supporting Role	Thailand
2013	King Naresuan 5	Prince Hanfa	Supporting Role	Thailand
2015	The Man with the Iron Fists 2	Duyan Jurne	Supporting Role	Hollywood
2015	Twilight Over Burma		Supporting Role	Austria

=== Television series ===
Year	Title	Role	Network	Notes
1995	Jao Po Jam Pen	Devid	Channel 5, Thailand	Supporting role
1996	Rak Thoe Samoe (Ruea)		Channel 3, Thailand	Supporting role
1996	Rakloklok Ya Bok Khrai	Udomsak	Channel 5, Thailand	Supporting role
1998	Kanlapangha	Captain Trin	Channel 3, Thailand	Lead role
1999	Khoei Likay	Prasaeng	Channel 3, Thailand	Lead role
2000	Tam Chap Tam Chip	Captain Ratthaphum	Channel 3, Thailand	Lead role
2000	Ayarak	Thoetsak	Channel 3, Thailand	Lead role
2001	Game Tanha	Yothin	Channel 3, Thailand	Lead role
2001	Saensaep	Phlaeng	Channel 5, Thailand	Lead role
2002	Letter to the star	Sila	Channel 3, Thailand	Lead role
2002	5 Kom	Captain Det Phumin	Channel 3, Thailand	Lead role
2002	Le Lap Salap Rang	Captain Ramin Thungpraphloeng	Channel 3, Thailand	Lead role
2003	Phayakrai 6 Phandin (Asian King)	Captain Atsawin	Channel 3, Thailand	Lead role
2003	Chao Nai Wai Kra To	Captain Uap	Channel 3, Thailand	Lead role
2003	Wiwa Pha Wun	Thana Yut	Channel 3, Thailand	Lead role
2006	Blackbeard	Seng	Hallmark Channel, USA	Supporting role
2007	Chomchai	Phubet	Channel 3, Thailand	Supporting role
2008	sufan nirandon	Phaya Anuchitracha	Channel 3, Thailand	Supporting role
2009	Soo Fun Nirundorn	Kanlachak	Channel 3, Thailand	Main cast
2010	Chaloei Sak	Adisak Santatiwong	Channel 3, Thailand	Supporting role
2011	Tawan Dueat	Narong	Channel 3, Thailand	Supporting role
2012	Nuer Mek 2	Chak Amatarittha	Channel 3, Thailand	Supporting role/villain
2013	Khaen Saneha	Luang Wisetthamrong	Channel 3, Thailand	Supporting role
2013	Sap Pra Pheng	Prince Pranma	Channel 3, Thailand	Supporting role
2014	Wiang roidao	Pakon Bodinthon	Channel 3, Thailand	Supporting role
2014	Ruean Ritsaya	Lit	Channel 3, Thailand	Supporting role
2014	Roirak Hakliam Tawan	Misawa Riki	Channel 3, Thailand	Supporting role
2014	Suai Rai Sailap	Commander Sathityut	Channel 3, Thailand	Supporting role
2014	Grean House The Series	Doctor Kop	Channel 9, Thailand	Supporting role
2014	Drama in honor of His Majesty the King - Under the Royal Umbrella	Ukrit	Channel 7, Thailand	Supporting role
2015	Chatchaophaya : Sing 4 Khwae	Sin Songkhwae	Channel 3, Thailand	Supporting role
2016	Na Kak Nang Ek	Anon	Workpoint 23, Thailand	Supporting role
2016	City Of Light: The O.C. Thailand	Thana	One 31, Thailand	Supporting role
2016	Lueat Rak Thoranong	San	Channel 3, Thailand	Supporting role
2016	Kulap Tut Phet	Thewan Wongritphatchara	Channel 3, Thailand	Supporting role
2016	The Magic Rope Trilogy	Yang	GMM 25, Thailand	Supporting role
2017	Water Boyy	Coach Thi	GMM 25, Thailand	Supporting role
2017	Rachinee Morlum	Sak Srisila	One 31, Thailand	Supporting role
2017	Tulip Thong	Captain Jacky	Channel 7, Thailand	Supporting role
2018	Mue Prap Yiao Dam	Captain Somsak	Channel 7, Thailand	Supporting role
2018	Sai Rak Sai Sawat	Serene Highness Kiantikong Supkhun	One 31, Thailand	Main cast
2019	Luk Krung	Kroo Reang	One 31, Thailand	Supporting role
2019	Poot Pissawat	Na-In	One 31, Thailand	Supporting role
2020	Oum Rak Game Luang	Piangpamseang Seangsakunchai	One 31, Thailand	Main cast
2021	Kaew Lerm Korn	Na-Diaw	One 31, Thailand	Main cast
2021	Karat Ruk	Chacrit (Crit)	Channel 3, Thailand	Main cast
2022	Dtai Laah	Paimyod Taokulab	One 31, Thailand	Supporting role
2022	Kem Son Plai	Tadtheb	Channel 7, Thailand	Cameo
2022	Club Friday the Series Love Seasons Celebration; Ep. It Happen On Valentine's Day	Wiwat	One 31, Thailand	Supporting role
2022	My Sassy Princess 2022; Ep. Sleeping Beauty	Jomphol (Jom)	One 31, Thailand	Supporting role
2023	Soi Nakhee	Kongkha Paisan-asanee / Mekha	Channel 7, Thailand	Main cast
2023	The Sky Without the Sun	Sano Piamngam (No)	Channel 7, Thailand	Main cast
2023	The Family	Phong	Amarin TV, Thailand	Supporting role
2024	Dhevaprom: Laorchan	Ratchanont Jutatheb (Lek)	Channel 3, Thailand	Support role
2024	Dhevaprom: Dujupsorn	Ratchanont Jutatheb (Lek)	Channel 3, Thailand	Guest role
2024	Dhevaprom: Poncheewan	Ratchanont Jutatheb (Lek)	Channel 3, Thailand	Guest role
2024	The Sweetest Taboo	Rangsan	Channel 3, Thailand	Main role
2025	Chata Hong	Kraison		
2025	Club Friday Theory of Love	Barami	One 31, Thailand	
2025	The White Lotus	Pornchai	HBO	Supporting role

=== TV Programs ===
- Deal or No Deal Thailand (2005)
- Kratuk Namtoey (Thailand)|ITV (2006-2007)
- Game Nana Chart (Thailand)|Channel 3
- Sing Nak Sueb (Thailand)|Channel 5
- Game La Maha Sanook (Thailand)|Channel 5

=== Movies Voice Recorder ===
- Puss in Boots (2011) | Puss in Boots (Thai)
- Shrek Forever After (2010) | Shrek (Thai)
- Monsters VS Aliens (2009) | Missing Link (Thai)
- The Dark Knight (2008) | Bruce Wayne/Batman (Thai)
- Shrek 3 (2007) | Puss in Boots (Thai)
- Over the Hedge (2006) | RJ (Thai)
- Batman Begins (2005) | PBruce Wayne/Batman (Thai)

=== Music video ===
- Mai Rak Dee / Paper Jam
- Rak Ter Tee Sud / Mint Attawadee
- Kord Kan / Bird Thongchai (Smile Club)
- Rao Sam Kon / Fourth Narumon (Fourth Inspiration)

== Awards ==
- Phra Suraswati Award 1998 / Best Supporting Actor (Crime King)
- Nataraj Award 2020 / Best Supporting Actor (Oum Rak Game Luang)
- Kom Chad Luek Award 2020 / Best Supporting Actor (Oum Rak Game Luang)
