= Michelle Monaghan =

American actress (born 1976)

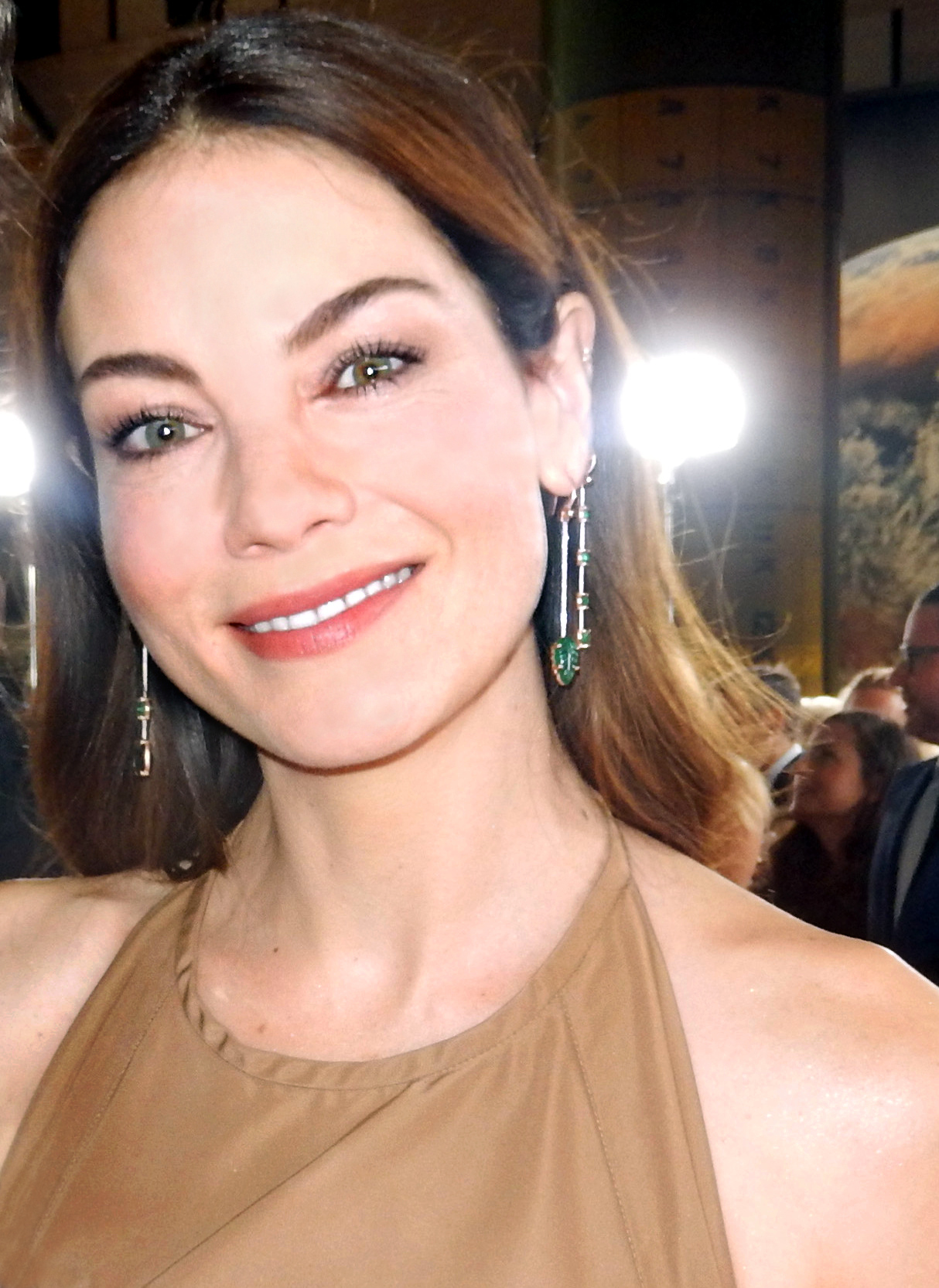
- Monaghan in 2018
- Born: Michelle Lynn Monaghan; March 23, 1976 (age 50); Winthrop, Iowa, U.S.
- Education: Columbia College Chicago
- Occupation: Actress
- Years active: 2000–present
- Spouse: Peter White (m. 2005)
- Children: 2

Michelle Lynn Monaghan (/ˈmɒnəhən/ MON-ə-hən; born March 23, 1976) is an American actress. She has starred in the films Kiss Kiss Bang Bang (2005), Gone Baby Gone (2007), Made of Honor (2008), Eagle Eye (2008), Trucker (2008), Source Code (2011), Pixels (2015) and Patriots Day (2016). She also received recognition for her role in the action spy film series Mission: Impossible, making appearances in Mission: Impossible III (2006), Ghost Protocol (2011) and Fallout (2018).

On television, Monaghan starred in the first season of the HBO anthology crime drama series True Detective (2014), earning a nomination for a Golden Globe Award. She has also starred in the drama series The Path (2016–2018), the miniseries Echoes (2022), and the third season of the anthology series The White Lotus (2025).

== Early life ==
Monaghan was born in the small town (then a population of about 750) of Winthrop, Iowa, the daughter of Sharon, who ran a daycare out of their family home, and Robert Monaghan, a factory worker. She is the youngest of three children, with two older brothers.

She has mostly Irish and German ancestry, and was raised Catholic. She graduated from East Buchanan High School in 1994. After graduation, she moved to Chicago to study journalism at Columbia College Chicago and began to model. She modeled in Milan, Singapore, Tokyo and Hong Kong, as well as in the United States. With one semester remaining to complete her journalism degree in 1999, she left for New York to pursue an acting career. She worked as a model, appearing in several magazines and catalogs, before making her acting debut.

== Career ==
Monaghan's first two credited television appearances, in a supporting role, were as Caroline Busse in episodes of Young Americans, which aired in 2000. She also performed on Law & Order: Special Victims Unit in "Consent", an episode that was broadcast on January 19, 2001, and she made her big-screen debut that same year in Perfume, playing the part of Henrietta. Her next film, again in a supporting role, was in 2002 in Unfaithful, starring Richard Gere and Diane Lane.

Monaghan got a big-break role in 2002 when she co-starred in the television series Boston Public playing the role of Kimberly Woods. After guest-starring for a season, she returned to film appearing in It Runs in the Family in 2003, Winter Solstice in 2004, and starring with Robert Downey Jr. and Val Kilmer in Kiss Kiss Bang Bang in 2005. She also appears in Constantine in 2005, but her role in that film was essentially cut, with her scenes viewable on the DVD under "deleted scenes". She also appeared in the action spy film series Mission: Impossible, making appearances in Mission: Impossible III (2006), Ghost Protocol (2011) and Fallout (2018).

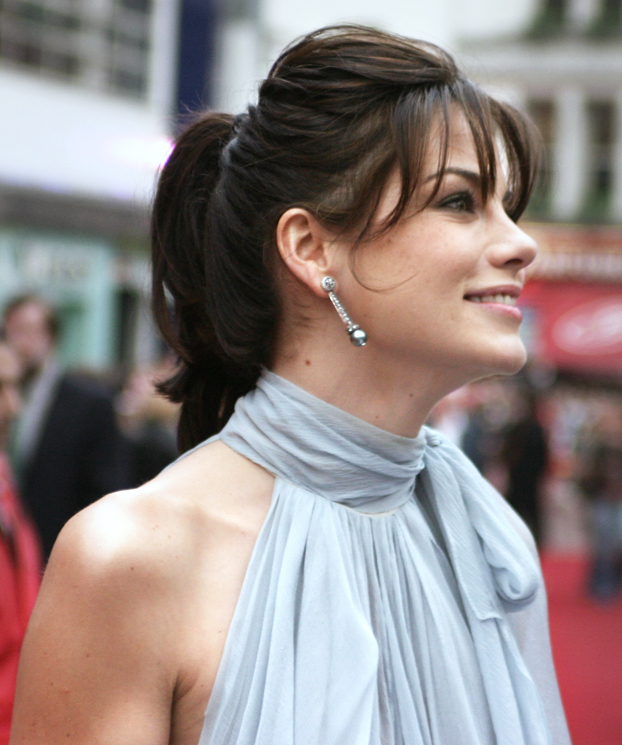
Monaghan at the Mission: Impossible III premiere in 2006

In 2007, she co-starred with Ben Stiller in The Heartbreak Kid remake, and with Casey Affleck in Gone Baby Gone. In 2008, she co-starred with Patrick Dempsey in Made of Honor, and co-starred with Shia LaBeouf in Eagle Eye. She starred alongside Jake Gyllenhaal in Source Code. She played Diane Ford in Trucker.

In 2014, Monaghan starred in the first season of HBO anthology series True Detective. She then appeared in the films Pixels (2015) and Patriots Day (2016).

In April 2016, Monaghan joined the principal cast of Shawn Christensen's independent feature film The Vanishing of Sidney Hall, which began filming later that month. Nine months later, on January 25, 2017, the film premiered at the Sundance Film Festival.

In May 2018, it was announced that Monaghan had been cast in the main role of CIA operative Eva Geller in the Netflix thriller Messiah. The series premiered on Netflix on January 1, 2020 and was cancelled after one season.

In 2024, Monaghan appeared in a supporting role in the horror film MaXXXine and stars in the third season of Emmy Award-winning show The White Lotus, which began filming in Thailand in February 2024. In 2024, she began to appear in television ads as a spokesperson for Spectrum.

== Personal life ==
Monaghan met Australian graphic artist Peter White at a party in 2000. They married in Port Douglas, Queensland, in August 2005—days before filming Mission Impossible III began. She gave birth to their daughter in 2008, and their son in 2013. She lives in Los Angeles with her family.

Monaghan was diagnosed with a melanoma, which was caught at an early stage and removed. Since, she has become an advocate for skin cancer prevention and sun safety. In 2026, she published a children's book, A Kids Book About Sun Safety.

== Filmography ==
Key
†	Denotes films that have not yet been released

=== Film ===
Year	Title	Role	Notes	Ref.
2001	Perfume	Henrietta		
2002	Unfaithful	Lindsay		
2003	It Runs in the Family	Peg Maloney		
2004	Winter Solstice	Stacey		
2004	The Bourne Supremacy	Kim		
2005	Constantine	Ellie	Uncredited cameo	
2005	Mr. & Mrs. Smith	Gwen		
2005	North Country	Sherry		
2005	Kiss Kiss Bang Bang	Harmony Faith Lane		
2006	Mission: Impossible III	Julia Meade		
2007	Gone Baby Gone	Angie Gennaro		
2007	The Heartbreak Kid	Miranda		
2008	Made of Honor	Hannah		
2008	Eagle Eye	Rachel Holloman		
2008	Trucker	Diane Ford	Also executive producer	
2010	Somewhere	Rebecca		
2010	Due Date	Sarah Highman		
2011	Source Code	Christina Warren		
2011	Mission: Impossible – Ghost Protocol	Julia Meade-Hunt	Uncredited cameo	
2011	Machine Gun Preacher	Lynn Childers		
2012	Tomorrow You're Gone	Florence Jane		
2013	Penthouse North	Sara Frost	Also known as Blindsided	
2013	Expecting	Andie		
2014	Fort Bliss	Maggie Swann		
2014	Better Living Through Chemistry	Kara Varney		
2014	Justice League: War	Diana Prince / Wonder Woman	Direct-to-video	
2014	Playing It Cool	Her		
2014	The Best of Me	Amanda Collier		
2015	Pixels	Violet van Patten		
2016	Patriots Day	Carol Saunders		
2017	Sleepless	Jennifer Bryant		
2017	The Vanishing of Sidney Hall	Velouria Hall		
2018	Mission: Impossible – Fallout	Julia Meade		
2018	Saint Judy	Judy Wood		
2020	The Craft: Legacy	Helen Schechner		
2021	Every Breath You Take	Grace		
2022	Nanny	Amy		
2022	Black Site	Abigail "Abby" Trent		
2022	Blood	Jess		
2023	Spinning Gold	Beth Bogart		
2023	The Family Plan	Jessica Morgan		
2024	MaXXXine	Detective Williams		
2025	The Family Plan 2	Jessica Morgan		
2026	Little Brother	Deirdre Landy		
2026	The Whisper Man	Detective Amanda Beck		

=== Television ===
Year	Title	Role	Notes	Ref.
2000	Young Americans	Caroline Busse	2 episodes	
2001	Law & Order: Special Victims Unit	Dana Kimble	Episode: "Consent"	
2002	Hack	Stacy Kumble	Episode: "Favors"	
2002–2003	Boston Public	Kimberly Woods	Recurring role; 8 episodes	
2013	American Dad!	Gina	Voice role; Episode: "Max Jets"	
2014	True Detective	Maggie Hart	Main role (season 1); 8 episodes	
2015	Comedy Bang! Bang!	Herself	Episode: "Michelle Monaghan Wears a Burnt Orange Dress and White Heels"	
2016–2018	The Path	Sarah Lane	Main role, 36 episodes Also producer	
2020	Messiah	Eva Geller	Main role, 10 episodes	
2022	Echoes	Leni and Gina McClery	Main role	
2024	Bad Monkey	Bonnie Witt / Plover Chase	Main role	
2025	The White Lotus	Jaclyn Lemon	Main role (season 3)	
2026	Running Wild with Bear Grylls	Herself	Episode: "Bear with Michelle Monaghan"	

=== Music videos ===
Year	Title	Artist(s)	Role	Notes	Ref.
2014	"I Did with You" (Lyric Video)	Lady A	Amanda Collier	Archival footage	
2019	"Over Drinking"	Little Big Town	—N/a		

== Awards and nominations ==
Year	Award	Category	Nominated work	Result
2005	Satellite Awards	Best Actress in a Supporting Role – Comedy or Musical	Kiss Kiss Bang Bang	Nominated
2006	Saturn Awards	Best Supporting Actress	Kiss Kiss Bang Bang	Nominated
2008	Critics' Choice Movie Awards	Best Acting Ensemble	Gone Baby Gone	Nominated
2009	San Diego Film Critics Society Awards	Best Actress	Trucker	Won
2015	Golden Globe Awards	Best Supporting Actress – Series, Miniseries or Television Film	True Detective	Nominated
2015	Satellite Awards	Best Supporting Actress – Series, Miniseries or Television Film	True Detective	Nominated
2016	Golden Raspberry Awards	Worst Supporting Actress	Pixels	Nominated
2026	Actor Awards	Outstanding Performance by an Ensemble in a Drama Series	The White Lotus	Nominated

Preceded by Vanessa Marshall (2010–2011)	Voice of Wonder Woman; 2014	Succeeded by Cobie Smulders
