= Arnas Fedaravicius =

Lithuanian actor

- Arnas Fedaravičius
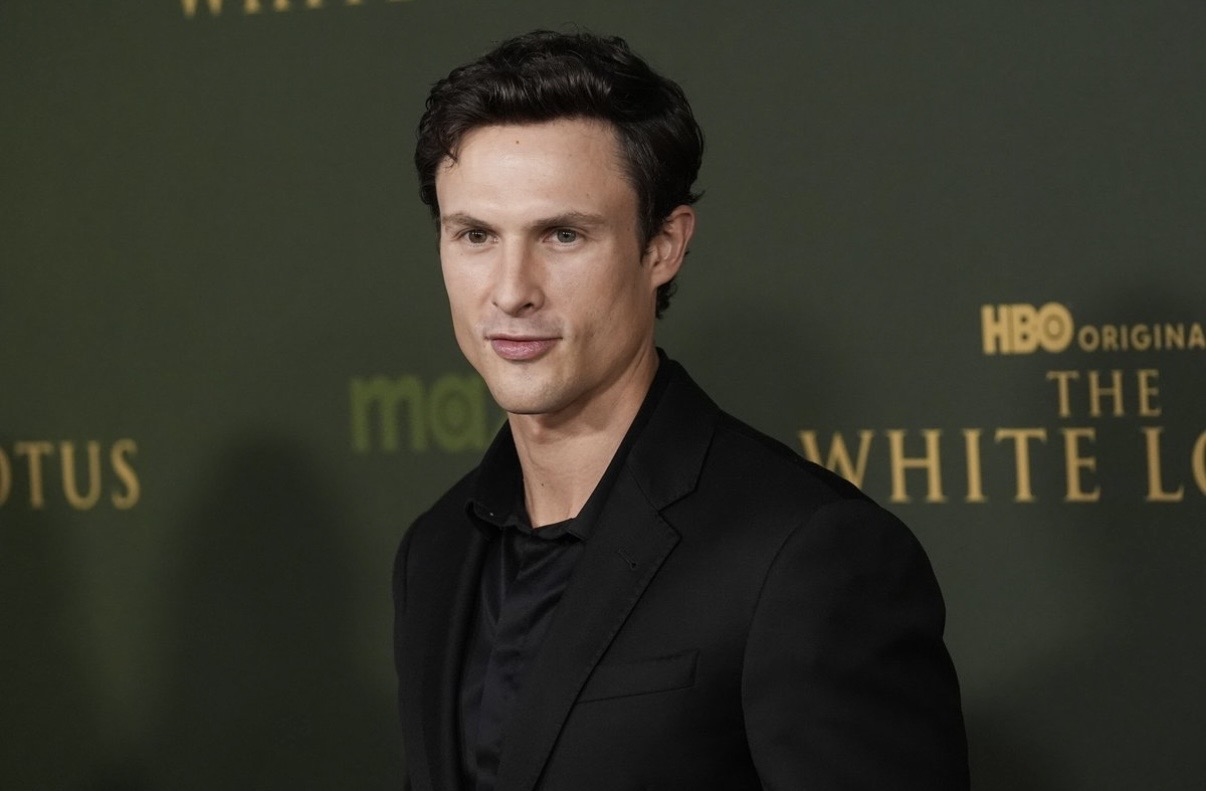
- Arnas Fedaravicius in 2025
- Born: Arnas Fedaravičius; 21 June 1991 (age 35); Vilnius, Lithuania
- Education: Lithuanian Academy of Music and Theatre
- Occupation: Actor
- Years active: 2013–present

Arnas Fedaravicius (Lithuanian: Arnas Fedaravičius; born 21 June 1991) is a Lithuanian actor. He is best known for his role as Sihtric in the Netflix series The Last Kingdom and as Valentin in the HBO anthology series The White Lotus.

== Early life and career ==
Fedaravicius was born in Vilnius, Lithuania, and studied at the Lithuanian Academy of Music and Theatre.

He worked as an actor, boxer, and other odd jobs for several years before landing a breakthrough role in The Last Kingdom, explaining: "At the time of The Last Kingdom I had just moved back to London from Russia...I was working as a flyer guy, street promotions. I just got a self-tape for it and I did it and completely forgot about it. I kept on doing the flyering job, and one day I got a call back. I was in the middle of my shift at 6.30 in the morning promoting a gym."

In early 2024, he was announced as a cast member for the third season of The White Lotus.

== Personal life ==
Fedaravicius speaks Lithuanian, English, Russian, and basic Italian. He has heterochromia iridum, with one green and one brown eye. As of 2023, he is in a relationship with American actress Emeraude Toubia.

== Selected filmography ==
=== Film ===
Year	Title	Role
2013	Siberian Education	Kolyma
2026	Mutiny	Mateo Pineda
TBA	The Boy in the Iron Box	TBA

=== Television ===
Year	Show	Role	Notes
2016	Tjockare än vatten	Andrus	7 episodes
2017–2022	The Last Kingdom	Sihtric	38 episodes
2023	The Last Kingdom: Seven Kings Must Die	Sihtric	TV film
2023	The Wheel of Time	Masema Dagar	4 episodes
2023	Shetland	Lukas Nowak	2 episodes
2025	The White Lotus	Valentin	8 episodes

=== Video games ===
Year	Title	Role
2018	Total War Saga: Thrones of Britannia	extra voices
2022	Total War: Warhammer III	extra voices
