= List of awards and nominations received by The White Lotus =

Awards and nominations received by The White Lotus
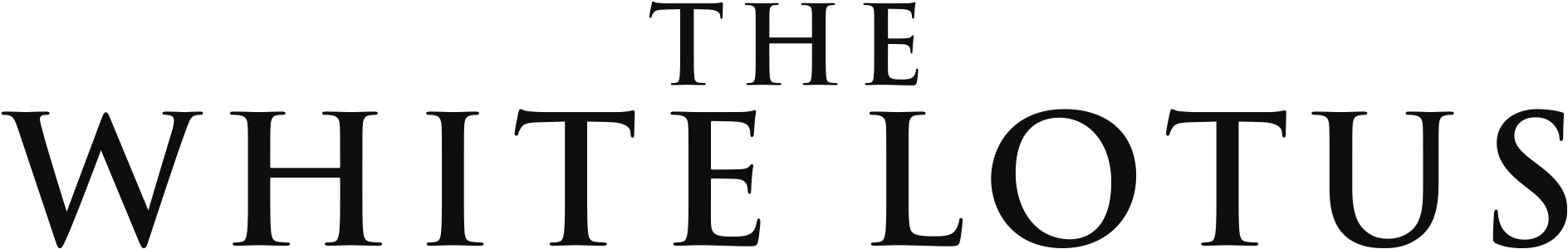
Awards and nominations
Award	Wins	Nominations
AACTA International Awards	4	5
AARP Movies for Grownups Awards	0	1
Actor Awards	2	8
American Cinema Editors Awards	1	4
American Film Institute Awards	2	2
Art Directors Guild Awards	0	2
ASCAP Film and Television Music Awards	4	4
Astra TV Awards	0	11
Black Reel Awards	0	1
British Academy Television Awards	0	2
Cinema Audio Society Awards	0	2
Costume Designers Guild Awards	0	1
Critics' Choice Television Awards	3	3
Directors Guild of America Awards	0	2
Dorian Awards	3	8
GLAAD Media Awards	1	2
Golden Globe Awards	2	11
Golden Reel Awards	0	2
Guild of Music Supervisors Awards	1	2
Hollywood Critics Association Creative Arts TV Awards	0	3
Hollywood Critics Association TV Awards	5	14
iHeartRadio Music Awards	0	1
Imagen Awards	0	1
Independent Spirit Awards	0	1
Location Managers Guild Awards	0	2
Make-Up Artists and Hair Stylists Guild Awards	0	1
MTV Movie & TV Awards	1	4
NAACP Image Awards	0	1
People's Choice Awards	0	1
Primetime Emmy Awards	6	33
Primetime Creative Arts Emmy Awards	10	34
Producers Guild of America Awards	1	2
Society of Composers & Lyricists Awards	2	2
Television Critics Association Awards	0	4
Writers Guild of America Awards	1	2

Totals (Note: Certain award groups do not simply award one winner. They acknowledge several different recipients, have runners-up, and have third place. Since this is a specific recognition and is different from losing an award, runner-up mentions are considered wins in this award tally. For simplification and to avoid errors, each award in this list has been presumed to have had a prior nomination.)
- Wins: 49
- Nominations: 158

The White Lotus is an American black comedy-drama anthology television series created by Mike White for HBO. It follows the guests and employees of the fictional White Lotus resort chain whose stay is affected by their various psychosocial dysfunctions. It was originally envisioned as a limited series, but was converted to an anthology series, and has been renewed most recently for a third season. Both seasons have been well-received critically. The first season holds a 90% approval rating on Rotten Tomatoes, while the second season garnered a rating of 93%.

The first season received 11 nominations at the 2022 Primetime Emmy Awards across five categories, winning for each, including Outstanding Limited or Anthology Series, Outstanding Writing and Outstanding Directing for White, Outstanding Supporting Actress for Jennifer Coolidge, and Outstanding Supporting Actor for Murray Bartlett. It was also nominated for nine Primetime Creative Arts Emmy Awards across eight categories, winning a further six Emmys. It was the series that won the most Emmys across both ceremonies. From 2024 onwards, The White Lotus will no longer be eligible to compete in the limited series category at the Emmy Awards ceremonies and will move to the drama category.

The second season received 12 nominations at the 2023 Primetime Emmy Awards across five categories and 11 nominations at the Primetime Creative Arts Emmy Awards across 10 categories.

The series was included in the American Film Institute Awards' top ten Programs of the Year list for 2021 and 2022. Coolidge is the most nominated actor for their work on the series, including Golden Globe Awards, Critics' Choice Television Awards, and Actor Awards wins. Cristobal Tapia de Veer is the most nominated crew member for his work as a composer, including two Emmy wins. The second season also won the Golden Globe for Best Limited or Anthology Series, and the cast won an Actor award for their performances.

== Total awards and nominations ==
=== Episode ===
Total awards and nominations for The White Lotus, Season 1 episodes
No. overall	No. in season	Title	Nominations	Awards
1	1	"Arrivals"	1	0
3	3	"Mysterious Monkeys"	6	3
5	5	"The Lotus-Eaters"	1	0
6	6	"Departures"	4	2

Total awards and nominations for The White Lotus, Season 2 episodes
No. overall	No. in season	Title	Nominations	Awards
7	1	"Ciao"	3	0
9	3	"Bull Elephants"	2	0
10	4	"In the Sandbox"	2	0
11	5	"That's Amore"	2	0
12	6	"Abductions"	3	0
13	7	"Arrivederci"	5	1

Total awards and nominations for The White Lotus, Season 3 episodes
No. overall	No. in season	Title	Nominations	Awards
14	1	"Same Spirits, New Forms"	2	0
18	5	"Full-Moon Party"	4	0
20	7	"Killer Instincts"	2	0
21	8	"Amor Fati"	6+	0

=== Cast ===
Total awards and nominations for the cast of The White Lotus
Actor	Character	Season(s)	Nominations	Awards
Jennifer Coolidge	Tanya McQuoid	1–2	18	11
Murray Bartlett	Armond	1	7	4
Aubrey Plaza	Harper Spiller	2	6	1
Aimee Lou Wood	Chelsea	3	5	0
Natasha Rothwell	Belinda Lindsey	1, 3	4	0
F. Murray Abraham	Bert Di Grasso	2	3	1
Carrie Coon	Laurie Duffy	3	3	0
Meghann Fahy	Daphne Sullivan	2	3	1
Walton Goggins	Rick Hatchett	3	3	0
Jason Isaacs	Timothy Ratliff	3	3	0
Theo James	Cameron Sullivan	2	3	1
Parker Posey	Victoria Ratliff	3	3	0
Will Sharpe	Ethan Spiller	2	3	1
Simona Tabasco	Lucia Greco	2	3	1
Beatrice Grannò	Mia	2	2	1
Sabrina Impacciatore	Valentina	2	2	1
Michael Imperioli	Dominic Di Grasso	2	2	1
Connie Britton	Nicole Mossbacher	1	2	0
Alexandra Daddario	Rachel Patton	1	2	0
Sydney Sweeney	Olivia Mossbacher	1	2	0
Steve Zahn	Mark Mossbacher	1	2	0
Jon Gries	Greg Hunt	2	2	1
Lalisa Manobal	Mook	3	2	0
Scott Glenn	Jim Hollinger	3	2	0
Sam Rockwell	Frank	3	2	0
Paolo Camilli	Hugo	2	1	1
Adam DiMarco	Albie Di Grasso	2	1	1
Federico Ferrante	Rocco	2	1	1
Bruno Gouery	Didier	2	1	1
Tom Hollander	Quentin	2	1	1
Haley Lu Richardson	Portia	2	1	1
Eleonora Romandini	Isabella	2	1	1
Federico Scribani	Giuseppe	2	1	1
Leo Woodall	Jack	2	1	1
Francesco Zecca	Matteo	2	1	1
Jake Lacy	Shane Patton	1	1	0

=== Crew ===
Total awards and nominations for the crew of The White Lotus
Person	Role(s)	Nominations	Awards
Mike White	Creator, director, & writer	16	6
Cristobal Tapia de Veer	Composer	12	8
John M. Valerio	Editor	5	2
Ryan Collins	Re-recording mixer	5	1
Christian P. Minkler	Re-recording mixer	4	1
Heather Persons	Editor	4	0
Alex Bovaird	Costume designer	4	0
Cristina Onori	Production designer	5	0
Letizia Santucci	Production designer	3	0
Meredith Tucker	Casting director	3	2

== Awards and nominations ==
Awards and nominations received by The White Lotus
Award	Year (Note: The listed year refers to the date of the ceremony, not necessarily the year in which the corresponding season or episode aired.)	Category	Nominee(s)	Result	Ref.
AACTA International Awards	2022	Best Comedy Series	The White Lotus	Won	
AACTA International Awards	2022	Best Actor in a Series	Murray Bartlett	Won	
AACTA International Awards	2022	Best Actress in a Series	Jennifer Coolidge	Nominated	
AACTA International Awards	2023	Best Comedy Series	The White Lotus	Won	
AACTA International Awards	2023	Best Actress in a Series	Jennifer Coolidge	Won	
AARP Movies for Grownups Awards	2023	Best TV Series	The White Lotus	Nominated	
AARP Movies for Grownups Awards	2024	Best Actress	Jennifer Coolidge	Won	
Actor Awards (Note: Previously known as Screen Actors Guild Awards.)	2022	Outstanding Performance by a Male Actor in a Miniseries or Television Movie	Murray Bartlett	Nominated	
Actor Awards	2022	Outstanding Performance by a Female Actor in a Miniseries or Television Movie	Jennifer Coolidge	Nominated	
Actor Awards	2023	Outstanding Performance by an Ensemble in a Drama Series	Various (Note: F. Murray Abraham, Paolo Camilli, Jennifer Coolidge, Adam DiMarco, Meghann Fahy, Federico Ferrante, Bruno Gouery, Beatrice Grannò, Jon Gries, Tom Hollander, Sabrina Impacciatore, Michael Imperioli, Theo James, Aubrey Plaza, Haley Lu Richardson, Eleonora Romandini, Federico Scribani, Will Sharpe, Simona Tabasco, Leo Woodall, and Francesco Zecca)	Won	
Actor Awards	2023	Outstanding Performance by a Female Actor in a Drama Series	Jennifer Coolidge	Won	
Actor Awards	2026	Outstanding Performance by an Ensemble in a Drama Series	Various (Note: Leslie Bibb, Carrie Coon, Nicholas Duvernay, Arnas Fedaravicius, Christian Friedel, Scott Glenn, Walton Goggins, Jon Gries, Dom Hetrakul, Sarah Catherine Hook, Jason Isaacs, Yuri Kolokolnikov, Julian Kostov, Charlotte Le Bon, Lalisa Manobal, Michelle Monaghan, Sam Nivola, Morgana O'Reilly, Lek Patravadi, Shalini Peiris, Parker Posey, Sam Rockwell, Natasha Rothwell, Patrick Schwarzenegger, Tayme Thapthimthong, and Aimee Lou Wood)	Nominated	
Actor Awards	2026	Outstanding Performance by a Male Actor in a Drama Series	Walton Goggins	Nominated	
Actor Awards	2026	Outstanding Performance by a Female Actor in a Drama Series	Parker Posey	Nominated	
Actor Awards	2026	Outstanding Performance by a Female Actor in a Drama Series	Aimee Lou Wood	Nominated	
American Cinema Editors Awards	2022	Best Edited Limited Series	Heather Persons (for "Mysterious Monkeys")	Nominated	
American Cinema Editors Awards	2022	Best Edited Limited Series	John M. Valerio (for "Departures")	Nominated	
American Cinema Editors Awards	2023	Best Edited Limited Series	Heather Persons (for "Abductions")	Nominated	
American Cinema Editors Awards	2023	Best Edited Limited Series	John M. Valerio (for "Arrivederci")	Won	
American Film Institute Awards	2022	Top 10 Programs of the Year	The White Lotus	Won (Note: This award does not have a single winner, but recognizes multiple series.)	
American Film Institute Awards	2023	Top 10 Programs of the Year	The White Lotus	Won	
Art Directors Guild Awards	2022	Excellence in Production Design for a Television Movie or Limited Series	Laura Fox	Nominated	
Art Directors Guild Awards	2023	Excellence in Production Design for a One-Hour Contemporary Single-Camera Series	Cristina Onori (for "Ciao")	Nominated	
ASCAP Film and Television Music Awards	2022	Television Score of the Year	Cristobal Tapia de Veer	Won	
ASCAP Film and Television Music Awards	2022	Television Theme of the Year	Cristobal Tapia de Veer	Won	
ASCAP Film and Television Music Awards	2023	Television Score of the Year	Cristobal Tapia de Veer & Kim Neundorf	Won	
ASCAP Film and Television Music Awards	2023	Television Theme of the Year	Cristobal Tapia de Veer	Won	
Astra TV Awards	2025	Best Cast Ensemble in a Cable Drama Series	The White Lotus	Won	
Astra TV Awards	2025	Best Directing in a Drama Series	Mike White (for "Full-Moon Party")	Nominated	
Astra TV Awards	2025	Best Drama Series	The White Lotus	Nominated	
Astra TV Awards	2025	Best Guest Actor in a Drama Series	Scott Glenn	Nominated	
Astra TV Awards	2025	Best Supporting Actor in a Drama Series	Walton Goggins	Won	
Astra TV Awards	2025	Best Supporting Actor in a Drama Series	Jason Isaacs	Nominated	
Astra TV Awards	2025	Best Supporting Actor in a Drama Series	Sam Rockwell	Nominated	
Astra TV Awards	2025	Best Supporting Actress in a Drama Series	Carrie Coon	Nominated	
Astra TV Awards	2025	Best Supporting Actress in a Drama Series	Parker Posey	Nominated	
Astra TV Awards	2025	Best Supporting Actress in a Drama Series	Aimee Lou Wood	Nominated	
Astra TV Awards	2025	Best Writing in a Drama Series	Mike White (for "Full-Moon Party")	Nominated	
Black Reel Awards	2022	Outstanding Supporting Actress, TV Movie/Limited Series	Natasha Rothwell	Nominated	
British Academy Television Awards	2023	Best International Programme	Mike White, David Bernad, Mark Kamine, John Valerio, Heather Persons	Nominated	
British Academy Television Awards	2023	Best Supporting Actor	Will Sharpe	Nominated	
British Academy Television Awards	2026	Best International Programme	Mike White, Mark Kamine, David Bernad	Nominated	
British Academy Television Awards	2026	Best Supporting Actress	Aimee Lou Wood	Nominated	
Cinema Audio Society Awards	2022	Outstanding Achievement in Sound Mixing for Television Series – One Hour	Walter Anderson, Christian Minkler, Ryan Collins, Jeffrey Roy, and Randy Wilson (for "The Lotus-Eaters")	Nominated	
Cinema Audio Society Awards	2023	Outstanding Achievement in Sound Mixing for Television Series – One Hour	Angelo Bonanni, Christian P. Minkler, Ryan Collins, Debra R. Winsberg, Michael Head (for "Ciao")	Nominated	
Costume Designers Guild Awards	2023	Excellence in Contemporary Television	Alex Bovaird (for "In the Sandbox")	Nominated	
Critics' Choice Television Awards	2022	Best Supporting Actor in a Limited Series or Movie Made for Television	Murray Bartlett	Won	
Critics' Choice Television Awards	2022	Best Supporting Actress in a Limited Series or Movie Made for Television	Jennifer Coolidge	Won	
Critics' Choice Television Awards	2023	Best Supporting Actress in a Drama Series	Jennifer Coolidge	Won	
Directors Guild of America Awards	2022	Outstanding Directorial Achievement in Comedy Series	Mike White (for "Mysterious Monkeys")	Nominated	
Directors Guild of America Awards	2023	Outstanding Directorial Achievement in Comedy Series	Mike White (for "Arrivederci")	Nominated	
Dorian Awards	2022	Best TV Movie or Miniseries	The White Lotus	Won	
Dorian Awards	2022	Best Supporting TV Performance	Jennifer Coolidge	Won	
Dorian Awards	2022	Best Supporting TV Performance	Murray Bartlett	Nominated	
Dorian Awards	2023	Best TV Drama	The White Lotus	Nominated	
Dorian Awards	2023	Best Supporting TV Performance – Drama	Jennifer Coolidge	Won	
Dorian Awards	2023	Best Supporting TV Performance – Drama	Meghann Fahy	Nominated	
Dorian Awards	2023	Best Supporting TV Performance – Drama	Aubrey Plaza	Nominated	
Dorian Awards	2023	Most Visually Striking Show	The White Lotus	Nominated	
GLAAD Media Awards	2022	Outstanding Limited or Anthology Series	The White Lotus	Nominated	
GLAAD Media Awards	2023	Outstanding Limited or Anthology Series	The White Lotus	Won	
Golden Globe Awards	2022	Best Supporting Actress – Series, Miniseries or Television Film	Jennifer Coolidge	Nominated	
Golden Globe Awards	2023	Best Limited or Anthology Series or Television Film	The White Lotus	Won	
Golden Globe Awards	2023	Best Supporting Actor – Series, Miniseries or Television Film	F. Murray Abraham	Nominated	
Golden Globe Awards	2023	Best Supporting Actress – Series, Miniseries or Television Film	Jennifer Coolidge	Won	
Golden Globe Awards	2023	Best Supporting Actress – Series, Miniseries or Television Film	Aubrey Plaza	Nominated	
Golden Globe Awards	2026	Best Television Series – Drama	The White Lotus	Nominated	
Golden Globe Awards	2026	Best Supporting Actor – Series, Miniseries or Television Film	Walton Goggins	Nominated	
Golden Globe Awards	2026	Best Supporting Actor – Series, Miniseries or Television Film	Jason Isaacs	Nominated	
Golden Globe Awards	2026	Best Supporting Actress – Series, Miniseries or Television Film	Carrie Coon	Nominated	
Golden Globe Awards	2026	Best Supporting Actress – Series, Miniseries or Television Film	Parker Posey	Nominated	
Golden Globe Awards	2026	Best Supporting Actress – Series, Miniseries or Television Film	Aimee Lou Wood	Nominated	
Golden Reel Awards	2022	Outstanding Achievement in Sound Editing – Limited Series or Anthology	Kathryn Madsen, Paul Hammond, Mark Allen, Stefan Fraticelli, and Mikael Sandgren	Nominated	
Golden Reel Awards	2023	Outstanding Achievement in Music Editing – Broadcast Long Form	Mikael Sandgren (for "Bull Elephants")	Nominated	
Guild of Music Supervisors Awards	2022	Best Music Supervision – Television Comedy or Musical	Janet Lopez	Nominated	
Guild of Music Supervisors Awards	2023	Best Music Supervision in a Trailer – Series	Deric Berberabe & Jordan Silverberg	Won	
Hollywood Creative Alliance Creative Arts TV Awards	2023	Best Short Form Series	The White Lotus: Unpacking the Episode	Nominated	
Hollywood Creative Alliance Creative Arts TV Awards	2023	Best Casting in a Drama Series	The White Lotus	Nominated	
Hollywood Creative Alliance Creative Arts TV Awards	2023	Best Contemporary Costumes	The White Lotus	Nominated	
Hollywood Critics Association TV Awards	2022	Best Broadcast Network or Cable Limited or Anthology Series	The White Lotus	Won	
Hollywood Critics Association TV Awards	2022	Best Supporting Actor in a Broadcast Network or Cable Limited or Anthology Series	Murray Bartlett	Won	
Hollywood Critics Association TV Awards	2022	Best Supporting Actor in a Broadcast Network or Cable Limited or Anthology Series	Steve Zahn	Nominated	
Hollywood Critics Association TV Awards	2022	Best Supporting Actress in a Broadcast Network or Cable Limited or Anthology Series	Connie Britton	Nominated	
Hollywood Critics Association TV Awards	2022	Best Supporting Actress in a Broadcast Network or Cable Limited or Anthology Series	Jennifer Coolidge	Won	
Hollywood Critics Association TV Awards	2022	Best Supporting Actress in a Broadcast Network or Cable Limited or Anthology Series	Alexandra Daddario	Nominated	
Hollywood Critics Association TV Awards	2022	Best Supporting Actress in a Broadcast Network or Cable Limited or Anthology Series	Sydney Sweeney	Nominated	
Hollywood Critics Association TV Awards	2022	Best Directing in a Broadcast Network or Cable Limited or Anthology Series	Mike White (for "Mysterious Monkeys")	Won	
Hollywood Critics Association TV Awards	2022	Best Writing in a Broadcast Network or Cable Limited or Anthology Series	Mike White (for "Mysterious Monkeys")	Won	
Hollywood Critics Association TV Awards	2023	Best Cable Series, Drama	The White Lotus	Nominated	
Hollywood Critics Association TV Awards	2023	Best Supporting Actor in a Broadcast Network or Cable Series, Drama	Theo James	Nominated	
Hollywood Critics Association TV Awards	2023	Best Supporting Actress in a Broadcast Network or Cable Series, Drama	Aubrey Plaza	Nominated	
Hollywood Critics Association TV Awards	2023	Best Supporting Actress in a Broadcast Network or Cable Series, Drama	Jennifer Coolidge	Nominated	
Hollywood Critics Association TV Awards	2023	Best Writing in a Broadcast Network or Cable Series, Drama	Mike White (for "Arrivederci")	Nominated	
iHeartRadio Music Awards	2026	Favorite On Screen	Lalisa Manobal	Nominated	
Imagen Awards	2022	Best Music Composition for Film or Television	Cristobal Tapia de Veer	Nominated	
Independent Spirit Awards	2022	Best Male Performance in a New Scripted Series	Murray Bartlett	Nominated	
Location Managers Guild Awards	2022	Outstanding Film Commission	Hawaii Film Office & Maui County Film Office: Donne Dawson, Tracy Bennett	Nominated	
Location Managers Guild Awards	2023	Outstanding Locations in a TV Serial Program, Anthology or Limited Series	Piernicola Pinnola	Won	
Location Managers Guild Awards	2025	Outstanding Locations in Television, MOW or Limited Series	Kittipat “Pat” Boonvanno, Monchai “Once” Dajamornrattanakul, Bundit “Bank” Kaewsri	Nominated	
MTV Movie & TV Awards	2023	Best Show	The White Lotus	Nominated	
MTV Movie & TV Awards	2023	Best Performance in a Show	Aubrey Plaza	Nominated	
MTV Movie & TV Awards	2023	Most Frightened Performance	Jennifer Coolidge	Won	
MTV Movie & TV Awards	2023	Best Duo	Simona Tabasco and Beatrice Grannò	Nominated	
Make-Up Artists and Hair Stylists Guild Awards	2023	Best Contemporary Make-Up in a Television Series, Television Limited or Miniseries or Television New Media Series	Rebecca Hickey, Federica Emidi	Nominated	
NAACP Image Awards	2022	Outstanding Supporting Actress in a Television Movie, Limited-Series, or Dramatic Special	Natasha Rothwell	Nominated	
People's Choice Awards	2021	The Bingeworthy Show of 2021	The White Lotus	Nominated	
Primetime Emmy Awards	2022	Outstanding Limited or Anthology Series	Mike White, David Bernad, Nick Hall, and Mark Kamine	Won	
Primetime Emmy Awards	2022	Outstanding Supporting Actor in a Limited or Anthology Series or Movie	Murray Bartlett (for "Recentering")	Won	
Primetime Emmy Awards	2022	Outstanding Supporting Actor in a Limited or Anthology Series or Movie	Jake Lacy (for "New Day")	Nominated	
Primetime Emmy Awards	2022	Outstanding Supporting Actor in a Limited or Anthology Series or Movie	Steve Zahn (for "Mysterious Monkeys")	Nominated	
Primetime Emmy Awards	2022	Outstanding Supporting Actress in a Limited or Anthology Series or Movie	Connie Britton (for "The Lotus Eaters")	Nominated	
Primetime Emmy Awards	2022	Outstanding Supporting Actress in a Limited or Anthology Series or Movie	Jennifer Coolidge (for "Mysterious Monkeys")	Won	
Primetime Emmy Awards	2022	Outstanding Supporting Actress in a Limited or Anthology Series or Movie	Alexandra Daddario (for "Departures")	Nominated	
Primetime Emmy Awards	2022	Outstanding Supporting Actress in a Limited or Anthology Series or Movie	Natasha Rothwell (for "Departures")	Nominated	
Primetime Emmy Awards	2022	Outstanding Supporting Actress in a Limited or Anthology Series or Movie	Sydney Sweeney (for "Mysterious Monkeys")	Nominated	
Primetime Emmy Awards	2022	Outstanding Directing for a Limited or Anthology Series or Movie	Mike White	Won	
Primetime Emmy Awards	2022	Outstanding Writing for a Limited or Anthology Series or Movie	Mike White	Won	
Primetime Emmy Awards	2024 (Note: Due to the 2023 Hollywood labor disputes, the 75th Primetime Emmy Awards (as well as its corresponding Creative Arts Emmys) were postponed from their originally planned September 2023 ceremony until January 2024.)	Outstanding Drama Series	Mike White, David Bernad, Nick Hall, and Mark Kamine	Nominated	
Primetime Emmy Awards	2024	Outstanding Supporting Actor in a Drama Series	F. Murray Abraham (for "Abductions")	Nominated	
Primetime Emmy Awards	2024	Outstanding Supporting Actor in a Drama Series	Michael Imperioli (for "That's Amore")	Nominated	
Primetime Emmy Awards	2024	Outstanding Supporting Actor in a Drama Series	Theo James (for "That's Amore")	Nominated	
Primetime Emmy Awards	2024	Outstanding Supporting Actor in a Drama Series	Will Sharpe (for "Arrivederci")	Nominated	
Primetime Emmy Awards	2024	Outstanding Supporting Actress in a Drama Series	Jennifer Coolidge (for "Arrivederci")	Won	
Primetime Emmy Awards	2024	Outstanding Supporting Actress in a Drama Series	Meghann Fahy (for "Arrivederci")	Nominated	
Primetime Emmy Awards	2024	Outstanding Supporting Actress in a Drama Series	Sabrina Impacciatore (for "Abductions")	Nominated	
Primetime Emmy Awards	2024	Outstanding Supporting Actress in a Drama Series	Aubrey Plaza (for "That's Amore")	Nominated	
Primetime Emmy Awards	2024	Outstanding Supporting Actress in a Drama Series	Simona Tabasco (for "That's Amore")	Nominated	
Primetime Emmy Awards	2024	Outstanding Directing for a Drama Series	Mike White	Nominated	
Primetime Emmy Awards	2024	Outstanding Writing for a Drama Series	Mike White	Nominated	
Primetime Emmy Awards	2025	Outstanding Drama Series	Mike White, David Bernad, Mark Kamine, Nicholas Simon, John M. Valerio, and Todd Brown	Nominated	
Primetime Emmy Awards	2025	Outstanding Supporting Actor in a Drama Series	Walton Goggins (episode: "Amor Fati")	Nominated	
Primetime Emmy Awards	2025	Outstanding Supporting Actor in a Drama Series	Jason Isaacs (episode: "Amor Fati")	Nominated	
Primetime Emmy Awards	2025	Outstanding Supporting Actor in a Drama Series	Sam Rockwell (episode: "Full-Moon Party")	Nominated	
Primetime Emmy Awards	2025	Outstanding Supporting Actress in a Drama Series	Carrie Coon (episode: "Amor Fati")	Nominated	
Primetime Emmy Awards	2025	Outstanding Supporting Actress in a Drama Series	Parker Posey (episode: "Full-Moon Party")	Nominated	
Primetime Emmy Awards	2025	Outstanding Supporting Actress in a Drama Series	Natasha Rothwell (episode: "Amor Fati")	Nominated	
Primetime Emmy Awards	2025	Outstanding Supporting Actress in a Drama Series	Aimee Lou Wood (episode: "Amor Fati")	Nominated	
Primetime Emmy Awards	2025	Outstanding Directing for a Drama Series	Mike White (episode: "Amor Fati")	Nominated	
Primetime Emmy Awards	2025	Outstanding Writing for a Drama Series	Mike White (episode: "Full-Moon Party")	Nominated	
Primetime Creative Arts Emmy Awards	2022	Outstanding Casting for a Limited or Anthology Series or Movie	Meredith Tucker and Katie Doyle	Won	
Primetime Creative Arts Emmy Awards	2022	Outstanding Contemporary Costumes	Alex Bovaird, Brian Sprouse, and Eileen Stroup (for "Arrivals")	Nominated	
Primetime Creative Arts Emmy Awards	2022	Outstanding Music Composition for a Limited or Anthology Series, Movie or Special	Cristobal Tapia de Veer (for "Mysterious Monkeys")	Won	
Primetime Creative Arts Emmy Awards	2022	Outstanding Original Main Title Theme Music	Cristobal Tapia de Veer	Won	
Primetime Creative Arts Emmy Awards	2022	Outstanding Music Supervision	Janet Lopez (for "Departures")	Nominated	
Primetime Creative Arts Emmy Awards	2022	Outstanding Production Design for a Narrative Contemporary Program (One Hour or More)	Laura Fox, Charles Varga, and Jennifer Lukehart	Nominated	
Primetime Creative Arts Emmy Awards	2022	Outstanding Single-Camera Picture Editing for a Limited or Anthology Series or Movie	John M. Valerio (for "Departures")	Won	
Primetime Creative Arts Emmy Awards	2022	Outstanding Single-Camera Picture Editing for a Limited or Anthology Series or Movie	Heather Persons (for "Mysterious Monkeys")	Nominated	
Primetime Creative Arts Emmy Awards	2022	Outstanding Sound Mixing for a Limited or Anthology Series or Movie	Christian Minkler, Ryan Collins, Walter Anderson, and Jeffrey Roy (for "Departures")	Won	
Primetime Creative Arts Emmy Awards	2024	Outstanding Short Form Nonfiction or Reality Series	The White Lotus: Unpacking the Episode	Nominated	
Primetime Creative Arts Emmy Awards	2024	Outstanding Casting for a Drama Series	Meredith Tucker, Francesco Vedovati, Barbara Giordani	Won	
Primetime Creative Arts Emmy Awards	2024	Outstanding Contemporary Costumes for a Series	Alex Bovaird, Brian Sprouse, Margherita Zanobetti (for "That's Amore")	Nominated	
Primetime Creative Arts Emmy Awards	2024	Outstanding Contemporary Hairstyling	Miia Kovero, Elena Gregorini, Italo Di Pinto (for "Abductions")	Won	
Primetime Creative Arts Emmy Awards	2024	Outstanding Main Title Design	Katrina Crawford, Mark Bashore, Lezio Lopes, Cian McKenna	Nominated	
Primetime Creative Arts Emmy Awards	2024	Outstanding Contemporary Makeup (Non-Prosthetic)	Rebecca Hickey, Federica Emidi, Francesca Antonetti, Rosa Saba (for "That's Amore")	Nominated	
Primetime Creative Arts Emmy Awards	2024	Outstanding Music Composition for a Series (Original Dramatic Score)	Cristobal Tapia de Veer (for "In the Sandbox")	Won	
Primetime Creative Arts Emmy Awards	2024	Outstanding Music Supervision	Gabe Hilfer (for "Bull Elephants")	Won	
Primetime Creative Arts Emmy Awards	2024	Outstanding Picture Editing for a Drama Series	Heather Persons (for "Abductions")	Nominated	
Primetime Creative Arts Emmy Awards	2024	Outstanding Picture Editing for a Drama Series	John M. Valerio (for "Arrivederci")	Nominated	
Primetime Creative Arts Emmy Awards	2024	Outstanding Production Design for a Narrative Contemporary Program (One Hour or More)	Cristina Onori, Gianpaolo Rifino, and Letizia Santucci (for "Ciao")	Nominated	
Primetime Creative Arts Emmy Awards	2024	Outstanding Sound Mixing for a Comedy or Drama Series (One Hour)	Christian Minkler, Ryan Collins, Vincenzo Urselli (for "Arrivederci")	Nominated	
Primetime Creative Arts Emmy Awards	2025	Outstanding Casting for a Drama Series	Meredith Tucker and Non Jungmeier	Nominated	
Primetime Creative Arts Emmy Awards	2025	Outstanding Contemporary Costumes for a Series	Alex Bovaird, Eileen Sieff Stroup, Preeyanan 'Lin' Suwannathada, Brian Sprouse, and Giulia Moschioni (for "Same Spirits, New Forms")	Nominated	
Primetime Creative Arts Emmy Awards	2025	Outstanding Cinematography for a Series (One Hour)	Ben Kutchins (for "Killer Instincts")	Nominated	
Primetime Creative Arts Emmy Awards	2025	Outstanding Contemporary Hairstyling	Miia Kovero, Derrick Anthony Spruill, Punchaya "Nern" Phorang, Teresa Hinton, and Sudjai 'Jaiko' Tangsiripracha (for "Amor Fati")	Nominated	
Primetime Creative Arts Emmy Awards	2025	Outstanding Contemporary Makeup (Non-Prosthetic)	Rebecca Hickey, Michelle Kearns, Wattana 'Geng' Garum, Vicky Nugent, and Jeerasak 'Jojo' Srinuan (for "Full-Moon Party")	Nominated	
Primetime Creative Arts Emmy Awards	2025	Outstanding Guest Actor in a Drama Series	Scott Glenn (for "Killer Instincts")	Nominated	
Primetime Creative Arts Emmy Awards	2025	Outstanding Original Main Title Theme Music	Cristobal Tapia de Veer	Won	
Primetime Creative Arts Emmy Awards	2025	Outstanding Music Composition for a Series (Original Dramatic Score)	Cristobal Tapia de Veer (for "Amor Fati")	Nominated	
Primetime Creative Arts Emmy Awards	2025	Outstanding Music Supervision	Gabe Hilfer (for "Same Spirits, New Forms")	Nominated	
Primetime Creative Arts Emmy Awards	2025	Outstanding Picture Editing for a Drama Series	John M. Valerio and Scott Turner (for "Amor Fati")	Nominated	
Primetime Creative Arts Emmy Awards	2025	Outstanding Production Design for a Narrative Contemporary Program (One Hour or More)	Cristina Onori, Jeremy Woolsey, and Letizia Santucci (for "Amor Fati")	Nominated	
Primetime Creative Arts Emmy Awards	2025	Outstanding Sound Mixing for a Comedy or Drama Series (One Hour)	Christian Minkler, Ryan Collins, Bea O'Sullivan, Jamison Rabbe, and Michael Head (for "Amor Fati")	Nominated	
Primetime Creative Arts Emmy Awards	2025	Outstanding Title Design	Katrina Crawford, Mark Bashore, Mauro Gimferrer, and Marcos Coral	Nominated	
Producers Guild of America Awards	2022	Outstanding Producer of Limited or Anthology Television Series	The White Lotus	Nominated	
Producers Guild of America Awards	2023	Outstanding Producer of Episodic Television, Drama	The White Lotus	Won	
Satellite Awards	2024	Best Genre Series	The White Lotus	Nominated	
Satellite Awards	2024	Best Actress in a Comedy or Musical Series	Jennifer Coolidge	Won	
Satellite Awards	2024	Best Supporting Actor in a Series, Miniseries & Limited Series, or Motion Picture Made for Television	Jon Gries	Nominated	
Set Decorators Society of America Awards	2025	Best Achievement in Décor/Design of a One Hour Contemporary Series	Letizia Santucci and Cristina Onori	Nominated	
Society of Composers & Lyricists Awards	2022	Outstanding Original Score for a Television Production	Cristobal Tapia de Veer	Won	
Society of Composers & Lyricists Awards	2023	Outstanding Score for Television	Cristobal Tapia de Veer	Won	
Television Critics Association Awards	2022	Program of the Year	The White Lotus	Nominated	
Television Critics Association Awards	2022	Outstanding New Program	The White Lotus	Nominated	
Television Critics Association Awards	2023	Program of the Year	The White Lotus	Nominated	
Television Critics Association Awards	2023	Outstanding Achievement in Drama	The White Lotus	Nominated	
Writers Guild of America Awards	2022	Long Form – Original	Mike White	Nominated	
Writers Guild of America Awards	2023	Limited Series	Mike White	Won	
