= Recentering =

- The White Lotus episode
- Episode no.: Season 1 Episode 4
- Directed by: Mike White
- Written by: Mike White
- Cinematography by: Ben Kutchins
- Editing by: John M. Valerio
- Original release date: August 1, 2021
- Running time: 58 minutes

Guest appearances
- Jon Gries as Greg Hunt; Kekoa Scott Kekumano as Kai; Lukas Gage as Dillon

Episode chronology
| ← Previous "Mysterious Monkeys" | Next → "The Lotus-Eaters" |
- The White Lotus season 1

"Recentering" is the fourth episode of the first season of the American black comedy drama anthology television series The White Lotus. The episode was written and directed by series creator Mike White. It originally aired on HBO on August 1, 2021.

The series follows the guests and employees of the fictional White Lotus resort chain. In the episode, Shane and Rachel are visited by his mother, Kitty, causing problems. Meanwhile, Armond faces a new dilemma.

According to Nielsen Media Research, the episode was seen by an estimated 0.515 million household viewers and gained a 0.1 ratings share among adults aged 18–49. The episode received generally positive reviews from critics, who praised the writing, character development and performances.

== Plot ==
Paula (Brittany O'Grady) and Kai (Kekoa Scott Kekumano) watch the sunrise at the beach, just as Kai explains more about the culture of the Native Hawaiians and reveals that his family was illegally evicted from their home by The White Lotus to build the hotel. She returns to the suite, which is witnessed by Olivia (Sydney Sweeney). Nicole (Connie Britton) asks Mark (Steve Zahn) about his actions the day before and his state of mind.

Armond (Murray Bartlett) confesses to Belinda (Natasha Rothwell) that he has relapsed after five years of sobriety. She advises him to get rid of the drugs.

At breakfast, Tanya (Jennifer Coolidge) tells Olivia and Paula that she turned in their backpack of drugs to Armond, who had previously said it had not been found. They confront Armond and demand it back. As Armond goes to retrieve it, he is confronted once again by Shane (Jake Lacy), who demands to talk to his boss. Angered, Armond takes the drugs and returns the bag to Olivia and Paula.

Shane's mother, Kitty (Molly Shannon), surprises him by showing up at the resort. While Shane is delighted, Rachel (Alexandra Daddario) is not.

While returning to her room, Tanya encounters a man named Greg (Jon Gries) trying to enter it. He claims he had thought it was his room, and they have a pleasant conversation. They make plans to have dinner, leading Tanya to cancel her appointment with Belinda to discuss the wellness business. Belinda, who had put together a business plan, is disappointed.

That night, Olivia approaches Kai and introduces herself without revealing her connection to Paula. She conspicuously flirts with him.

At dinner, Shane brings up Rachel's career and Kitty suggests Rachel pursue charity work, like she does. Rachel expresses a desire not to become a trophy wife, a concern Kitty dismisses, asserting that there is nothing wrong with being a trophy wife.

On her date with Greg, Tanya learns that he works for the Bureau of Land Management, not Black Lives Matter, as she had believed. After dinner, they have sex in her room.

Armond invites Dillon (Lukas Gage) to his office, where admits his attraction and suggests they do drugs and have sex. Meanwhile, Shane tries to contact Armond's boss, only to discover that he was given a fake number. He asks Belinda to find Armond for him. She leads him to his office, where they are both shocked to find him performing anilingus on Dillon. Shane walks away, pleased that he has leverage to get Armond fired.

== Production ==
=== Development ===
In June 2021, HBO announced that the fourth episode of the season would be titled "Recentering", and that it would be written and directed by series creator Mike White. This was White's fourth writing and directorial credit for the series.

== Reception ==
=== Viewers ===
In its original American broadcast, "Recentering" was seen by an estimated 0.515 million household viewers with a 0.1 in the 18-49 demographics. This means that 0.1 percent of all households with televisions watched the episode. This was a slight increase from the previous episode, which was watched by 0.478 million household viewers with a 0.1 in the 18-49 demographics.

=== Critical reviews ===
"Recentering" received generally positive reviews from critics. Roxana Hadadi of The A.V. Club gave the episode an "A–" grade and wrote, "Even as 'Recentering' finally acknowledges the Hawaiian perspective, sketches out the sympathetic Paula, and tumbles Armond further into self-destructive debauchery, Mike White's insistence that our identities are generationally cyclical looms large."

Amanda Whiting of Vulture gave the episode a 3 star rating out of 5 and wrote, "The White Lotus has been circling the possibility that it's a show with something to say, but this week, Mike White finally lands the plane (sort of). The rich, white hotel guests — smiling, damaged — are each presented a chance to show what they're about. One by one, they arrive at the same answer: themselves. Still, as a series, The White Lotus is more curious about the deficiencies of its privileged characters than in getting to know the characters who wait on them."

Alex Noble of TheWrap wrote, "If you've been keeping up with The White Lotus, then you've probably noticed that the show, written and directed by Mike White, is far more concerned with the social satire than the murder it keeps teasing us with. If that's an itch you need scratched, there is plenty of other HBO Max programming for you. But personally, I'm loving the show’s approach. Still, now that we're past the series halfway mark, I can't help but wonder if the emphasis on the character dynamics is intended to distract us from some killer in plain sight." Breeze Riley of Telltale TV gave the episode a 3.5 star rating out of 5 and wrote, "Hopefully, The White Lotus continues to build on the ideas brought up on this episode instead of relying on the same self-absorbed drama of its increasingly predictable characters."

=== Accolades ===
For the episode, Murray Bartlett won Outstanding Supporting Actor in a Limited or Anthology Series or Movie at the 74th Primetime Emmy Awards.
