= Departures (The White Lotus) =

- The White Lotus episode
- Episode no.: Season 1 Episode 6
- Directed by: Mike White
- Written by: Mike White
- Cinematography by: Ben Kutchins
- Editing by: John M. Valerio
- Original release date: August 15, 2021
- Running time: 66 minutes

Guest appearances
- Jon Gries as Greg Hunt; Lukas Gage as Dillon

Episode chronology
← Previous "The Lotus-Eaters"	Next → "Ciao"
- The White Lotus season 1

"Departures" is the sixth and final episode of the first season of the American black comedy drama anthology television series The White Lotus. The episode was written and directed by series creator Mike White. It originally aired on HBO on August 15, 2021.

The series follows the guests and employees of the fictional White Lotus resort chain. The season is set on Maui, and follows two couples, the Pattons and the Mossbachers, along with a woman named Tanya, as they each have different conflicts during their stay. In the episode, Armond faces a new problem, while Rachel takes a stand on her marriage.

According to Nielsen Media Research, the episode was seen by an estimated 0.850 million household viewers and gained a 0.2 ratings share among adults aged 18–49. The episode received critical acclaim, with critics praising White's directing, writing, performances, score and closure to the storylines.

== Plot ==
On their last day at the White Lotus, Quinn (Fred Hechinger) tells his family that he plans to stay and join the local paddlers. Mark (Steve Zahn) and Nicole (Connie Britton) refuse to allow him to stay and jeopardize his education.

Having learned of Mark's assault, and to get back at Armond (Murray Bartlett), Shane (Jake Lacy) contacts a family friend to get in touch with Armond's boss. He also gets a pineapple knife for self-defense. Rachel (Alexandra Daddario) confesses that she regrets marrying Shane and does not want to feel like a trophy wife. Armond informs the Mossbachers that their jewelry has been recovered, and that the police arrested the culprit, Kai. This unsettles Paula (Brittany O'Grady), and Olivia (Sydney Sweeney) realizes she was right in suspecting her. She confronts her, but Paula deflects the accusations by claiming Olivia is as privileged as the rest of her family. Armond is contacted by his superior, who has talked with Shane. Realizing his job is over, Armond goes back to his office and decides to use the remainder of the drugs with Dillon (Lukas Gage).

Wanting to stay with Greg (Jon Gries), Tanya (Jennifer Coolidge) decides to leave cash to Belinda (Natasha Rothwell), but says she cannot yet commit to their wellness business. Olivia and Paula reconcile after the latter regrets her actions. After an awkward dinner where Rachel reaffirms her decision, Shane leaves for the bar. High on drugs, Armond goes to Shane's room and defecates in his suitcase. Before he can leave, Shane arrives at the room and Armond has to hide. As Shane is talking on the phone, complaining, he hears a noise. Armed with the pineapple knife, he enters the room Armond is hiding in and accidentally stabs him. Shane flees the room while Armond collapses, dying from his wound. Armond's body is loaded onto the guests' return flight. Shane is not arrested. At the airport, he reunites with Rachel, who has decided to stay with him and "be happy." The guests prepare to leave. Quinn leaves the airport while the Mossbachers are boarding their flight. The season ends with Quinn paddling with the locals.

== Production ==
=== Development ===
In June 2021, HBO announced that the final episode of the season would be titled "Departures", and that it would be written and directed by series creator Mike White. This was White's sixth writing and directorial credit for the series.

=== Writing ===
The reveal of Armond as the dead person in the coffin was planned from the start by White. He said, "So it was engineered from the beginning and I just felt like the guy's like an actor who plays King Lear. He has his best scene ever. And then he has the ultimate act of defiance where he craps in someone's bag. And I was like, 'There's really nowhere else to go from here.' But this is your swan song. So it felt like the right ending for him." Murray Bartlett commented on his character's fate, "It was really a fitting, bittersweet end for this character. He completely unravels and I'm not sure where he goes from there. He's sort of living a hell in his mind and in his life. And there's something about him being released from that. And I feel like you sort of see that in his final moment a little bit. There's some sort of, 'Thank God. I'm out of this.' It's a sad end, but it feels fitting. I really feel for this character. But it made sense to me."

The closure to Shane's and Rachel's arc was deemed "sort of happy" by White. He said, "As far as what it means in terms of her idealism and what she's choosing, it's bittersweet. I don't judge her for it. It was always about her choosing that lifestyle and whatever compromises she was going to have to make in connection with that. And so it made sense for the character." He added, "I do feel that, in my experience, a lot of times that's what happens. I knew The Emoji Movie wasn't going to be good and I did it. So sometimes money and the lifestyle does draw you in."

== Reception ==
=== Viewers ===
In its original American broadcast, "Departures" was seen by an estimated 0.850 million household viewers with a 0.2 in the 18-49 demographics. This means that 0.2 percent of all households with televisions watched the episode. This was a 51% increase from the previous episode, which was watched by 0.541 million household viewers with a 0.1 in the 18-49 demographics.

=== Critical reviews ===
"Departures" received critical acclaim. Roxana Hadadi of The A.V. Club gave the episode an "A-" grade and wrote, "Well, our six-week-long cosplay as Detective David Mills is over. Did we all assume Rachel Patton was the body being loaded onto the leaving plane? The White Lotus has certainly leaned into that suggestion, with Alexandra Daddario's sad eyes and Shane Patton's trigger temper. But 'Departures' doesn't go the depressingly predictable husband-kills-wife route. Instead, it goes another similarly depressing, similarly predictable route: A rich guy kills a guy with less money, zero social connections, and no family name to hide behind, and no one bats an eye."

Alan Sepinwall of Rolling Stone wrote, "The story of this season of White Lotus was impeccably told, and didn't need a sequel. But turning the title into a seasonal anthology a la American Horror Story seems a much better idea than, say, trying to generate a second season of Big Little Lies. Our world does not lack for either terrible rich people or beautiful places. And after a career spent mostly making arthouse fare, it's hard to blame White for wanting to take himself on another expensive trip — especially since we'll get to come along for the ride." Amanda Whiting of Vulture gave the episode a perfect 5 star rating out of 5 and wrote, "Here is a television series that fulfills its promises. Dark, hectic, and stirring, The White Lotus' season finale at last caught up to its frame story, which has been looming faintly over the action but never appeared to steer it."

Alex Noble of TheWrap wrote, "Even in the era of 'Peak TV', I often struggle to find shows that don't rehash the same tired dramatic tropes, aren't nihilistic for the sake of being nihilistic and, frankly, that are actually funny. The White Lotus has been a tropical breeze through a television landscape that is often far more ham-fisted, self-serious and emotionally-detached than it needs to be." Breeze Riley of Telltale TV gave the episode a 4 star rating out of 5 and wrote, "HBO plans to bring The White Lotus back as an anthology series with new guests and a new location, but this finale leaves you wondering how anyone could be convinced to watch more. Maybe like the guests, viewers will just want things to stay the same."

=== Accolades ===
Alexandra Daddario and Natasha Rothwell submitted the episode to support their Outstanding Supporting Actress in a Limited or Anthology Series or Movie nominations at the 74th Primetime Emmy Awards. They would lose the award to their co-star, Jennifer Coolidge.
