= Mysterious Monkeys =

- The White Lotus episode
- Episode no.: Season 1 Episode 3
- Directed by: Mike White
- Written by: Mike White
- Cinematography by: Ben Kutchins
- Editing by: Heather Persons
- Original release date: July 25, 2021
- Running time: 58 minutes

Guest appearances
- Kekoa Scott Kekumano as Kai; Lukas Gage as Dillon

Episode chronology
← Previous "New Day"	Next → "Recentering"
- The White Lotus season 1

"Mysterious Monkeys" is the third episode of the first season of the American black comedy drama anthology television series The White Lotus. The episode was written and directed by series creator Mike White. It originally aired on HBO on July 25, 2021.

The series follows the guests and employees of the fictional White Lotus resort chain. The season is set on Maui, and follows two couples, the Pattons and the Mossbachers, along with a woman named Tanya, as they each have different conflicts during their stay. In the episode, Mark is distraught over his father's revelation, while Armond sabotages Shane's plan for a romantic dinner with Rachel.

According to Nielsen Media Research, the episode was seen by an estimated 0.478 million household viewers and gained a 0.1 ratings share among adults aged 18–49. The episode received generally positive reviews from critics, who praised the humor and performances, but criticized the lack of progress in the main death mystery.

== Plot ==
Quinn (Fred Hechinger) awakens on the beach and discovers that the rising tide has destroyed his phone, iPad and Nintendo Switch. He asks his parents to get him a new phone right away, but they tell him he has to wait until they return home. Mark (Steve Zahn) remains distraught over the revelation that his father was bisexual.

Belinda (Natasha Rothwell) shares with her son the news that Tanya (Jennifer Coolidge) wants to invest in a wellness business, and her son tells her to accept the offer as he feels the White Lotus is wasting her talents.

Rachel (Alexandra Daddario) questions whether her relationship with Shane (Jake Lacy) is solely based on sex, which he denies; later, Rachel is annoyed by Shane flirting with Olivia and Paula by the pool. Shane asks Armond (Murray Bartlett) to make up for the issue with the suite by arranging a romantic dinner. Armond suggests a sunset boat ride, but doesn't reveal that Tanya (Jennifer Coolidge) will also be present so she can spread her mother's ashes.

On the boat, Tanya believes Shane and Rachel are there to support her, which confuses and angers Shane. She interrupts their dinner to deliver a deeply personal eulogy for her mother that includes many harsh criticisms. Tanya quickly becomes upset and borderline hysterical, alarming Shane and Rachel. Shane later insists to Rachel that Armond arranged the disastrous dinner on purpose.

At the resort, Mark drinks heavily and has awkward conversations with several guests. He speaks with Armond, who is gay, and expresses curiosity about sexual encounters with men. Armond makes a pass at him, and Mark awkwardly declines, then joins his family for dinner.

That night, Olivia (Sydney Sweeney) follows Paula (Brittany O'Grady) to a room, where she sees her having sex with Kai (Kekoa Scott Kekumano).

== Production ==
=== Development ===
In June 2021, HBO announced that the third episode of the season would be titled "Mysterious Monkeys", and that it would be written and directed by series creator Mike White. This was White's third writing and directorial credit for the series.

== Reception ==
=== Viewers ===
In its original American broadcast, "Mysterious Monkeys" was seen by an estimated 0.478 million household viewers with a 0.1 in the 18-49 demographics. This means that 0.1 percent of all households with televisions watched the episode. This was a slight increase from the previous episode, which was watched by 0.459 million household viewers with a 0.1 in the 18-49 demographics.

=== Critical reviews ===
"Mysterious Monkeys" received generally positive reviews from critics. Roxana Hadadi of The A.V. Club gave the episode a "B–" grade and wrote, "There's also a narrative imbalance in this episode, in particular with how we explore the lives of Armond and Belinda, that makes me wonder whether The White Lotus will, in its remaining three episodes, deliberately and purposefully spend as much time with the resort staff as it does with its guests."

Amanda Whiting of Vulture gave the episode a 4 star rating out of 5 and wrote, "This week on The White Lotus, sex is the topic of conversation and, occasionally, even on the itinerary. It is variously divisive, clandestine, lusty, affirming, embarrassing, and solitary, but it's never very sexy."

Alex Noble of TheWrap wrote, "No clear murderer or murderee has presented itself just yet on HBO's The White Lotus. Thankfully, the stellar performances and writer-director Mike White's gift for dialogue have made for an entertaining stay regardless." Breeze Riley of Telltale TV gave the episode a 3.5 star rating out of 5 and wrote, "Will the rest of the guests get the same moment of catharsis? We've seen mini-breakthroughs for some of the guests, but a lot of unsaid feelings are still bubbling under the surface. I don't imagine every character will deliver their truth with as much flair as Tanya, but I still expect we'll see similar scenes as the season goes into its second half."

=== Accolades ===
Steve Zahn, Jennifer Coolidge, and Sydney Sweeney submitted the episode to support their Outstanding Supporting Actor in a Limited or Anthology Series or Movie and Outstanding Supporting Actress in a Limited or Anthology Series or Movie nominations at the 74th Primetime Emmy Awards. Zahn would lose the award to his co-star, Murray Bartlett, while Coolidge won the award.
