= New Day (The White Lotus) =

- The White Lotus episode
- Episode no.: Season 1 Episode 2
- Directed by: Mike White
- Written by: Mike White
- Cinematography by: Ben Kutchins
- Editing by: John M. Valerio
- Original release date: July 18, 2021
- Running time: 57 minutes

Guest appearance
- Kekoa Scott Kekumano as Kai

Episode chronology
← Previous "Arrivals"	Next → "Mysterious Monkeys"
- The White Lotus season 1

"New Day" is the second episode of the first season of the American black comedy drama anthology television series The White Lotus. The episode was written and directed by series creator Mike White. It originally aired on HBO on July 18, 2021.

The series follows the guests and employees of the fictional White Lotus resort chain. The season is set on Maui, and follows two couples, the Pattons and the Mossbachers, along with a woman named Tanya, as they each have different conflicts during their stay. In the episode, tensions arise between Shane and Rachel, while Mark is informed of his medical results.

According to Nielsen Media Research, the episode was seen by an estimated 0.459 million household viewers and gained a 0.1 ratings share among adults aged 18–49. The episode received critical acclaim, with critics praising the character development, stories, directing and score.

== Plot ==
Bored with their vacation, Olivia (Sydney Sweeney) and Paula (Brittany O'Grady) smoke marijuana that Paula brought over. Before trying ketamine, they are interrupted by Nicole (Connie Britton), who happily announces that the test results for Mark (Steve Zahn) came back negative. As a result, Mark is now in a much happier mood, feeling he has a new lease on life.

Armond (Murray Bartlett) confides in Belinda (Natasha Rothwell) that he feels guilty for not knowing about Lani's pregnancy, and has been tempted to drink, which would break his five-year sobriety. Shane (Jake Lacy) is still determined to get the Pineapple Suite, frustrating Rachel (Alexandra Daddario). He speaks with the German couple who Armond mentioned is staying in the suite, and learns that they are leaving a day earlier than Armond said. Shane triumphantly tells Rachel that Armond lied, and calls his mother for help.

Rachel receives an offer to write a piece, but Shane is annoyed, as she is supposed to be on vacation. She's concerned about losing relationships she's built as a freelancer, but Shane tells her they don't need the money and implies she no longer needs to work. Troubled, Rachel approaches Nicole and asks her for career advice. Nicole advises Rachel not to give up her career in case her marriage doesn't work out, but then is alarmed and offended when she realizes Rachel wrote a patronizing article about her, leaving Rachel dejected.

Olivia and Paula try ketamine on the beach, where they're approached by Tanya (Jennifer Coolidge), who asks for recommendations on where to spread her mother's ashes. The girls are spooked and run away, leaving their backpack of drugs behind. Tanya turns the bag in and it gets to Armond, who gives in to temptation and takes some of the drugs. When Olivia later asks him about the bag, he claims nothing was turned in.

Mark asks Quinn (Fred Hechinger) to learn to scuba dive with him, wanting them to bond since his own father died when he was around Quinn's age. Quinn reluctantly agrees. Olivia sees Paula sneaking away to spend time with Kai, a hotel employee, but Paula plays dumb when Olivia asks her about him.

Rachel tells Shane she is going to accept the assignment, angering him.

Belinda is approached by Tanya, who is so grateful for her service that she wants to fund a wellness business with her, intriguing her. While talking with his uncle, Mark is surprised to discover that his father did not die from cancer, but AIDS. His father did not want anyone to tell him until it was proper time, also revealing that he had sex with men.

Quinn goes to sleep on the beach, and at sunset he sees a whale surfacing nearby.

== Production ==
=== Development ===
In June 2021, HBO announced that the second episode of the season would be titled "New Day", and that it would be written and directed by series creator Mike White. This was White's second writing and directorial credit for the series.

== Reception ==
=== Viewers ===
In its original American broadcast, "New Day" was seen by an estimated 0.459 million household viewers with a 0.1 in the 18-49 demographics. This means that 0.1 percent of all households with televisions watched the episode. This was a slight increase from the previous episode, which was watched by 0.420 million household viewers with a 0.1 in the 18-49 demographics.

=== Critical reviews ===
"New Day" received critical acclaim. Roxana Hadadi of The A.V. Club gave the episode an "A–" grade and wrote, "'New Day' is a whirlwind of an episode, so packed with plot and character development and so interspersed with wry asides and satirical moments that I had to stop my normal process of writing recaps, which is to take notes during an episode and then go back through them, highlighting in various colors different elements of the episode I want to discuss."

Amanda Whiting of Vulture gave the episode a 4 star rating out of 5 and wrote, "In this week's episode, beach boys lug chaises longues onto the hot sand, waiters gawk as Shane Patton piles an obscene buffet plate, and the wealthy resort guests enmesh themselves in the lives of the staff without much thought to what happens when they leave. Consequences are as ephemeral as sunsets."

Alex Noble of TheWrap wrote, "Well, as of Episode 2, a murder victim (and culprit) have yet to reveal themselves. Given the multiple rising tensions amongst the guests and staff at The White Lotus, however, I'm willing to bet that we'll know at least one very soon." Breeze Riley of Telltale TV gave the episode a 4 star rating out of 5 and wrote, "Creating a false sense of peace and then ripping it away is The White Lotus's main storytelling trick so far, and it continues to work well. You're left wondering what other bombshells will drop before the guests finish their stay."

=== Accolades ===
Jake Lacy submitted the episode to support his Outstanding Supporting Actor in a Limited or Anthology Series or Movie nomination at the 74th Primetime Emmy Awards. He would lose the award to his co-star, Murray Bartlett.
