= The Lotus-Eaters (The White Lotus) =

- The White Lotus episode
- Episode no.: Season 1 Episode 5
- Directed by: Mike White
- Written by: Mike White
- Cinematography by: Ben Kutchins
- Editing by: Heather Persons
- Original release date: August 8, 2021
- Running time: 60 minutes

Guest appearances
- Jon Gries as Greg Hunt; Kekoa Scott Kekumano as Kai; Lukas Gage as Dillon; Alec Merlino as Hutch; Christie Leigh Volkmer as Christie

Episode chronology
← Previous "Recentering"	Next → "Departures"
- The White Lotus season 1

"The Lotus-Eaters" is the fifth episode of the first season of the American black comedy drama anthology television series The White Lotus. The episode was written and directed by series creator Mike White. It originally aired on HBO on August 8, 2021.

The series follows the guests and employees of the fictional White Lotus resort chain. The season is set on Maui, and follows two couples, the Pattons and the Mossbachers, along with a woman named Tanya, as they each have different conflicts during their stay. In the episode, Paula conspires with Kai to steal from the Mossbachers, while Rachel reconsiders her marriage.

According to Nielsen Media Research, the episode was seen by an estimated 0.541 million household viewers and gained a 0.1 ratings share among adults aged 18–49. The episode received extremely positive reviews from critics, who praised the character development, performances and tone.

== Plot ==
In bed, Kai (Kekoa Scott Kukumano) reveals to Paula (Brittany O'Grady) that Olivia (Sydney Sweeney) was flirting with him, unsettling Paula. She leaves their room, telling him they probably won't see each other again as she is leaving soon, disappointing him. At the beach, Quinn (Fred Hechinger) is invited by locals to join their outrigger boat, and he enjoys paddling.

Nicole (Connie Britton) talks with Mark (Steve Zahn) over his infidelity confession, which they agreed to evade during their vacation. Wanting to avoid problems after the events of the previous night, Armond (Murray Bartlett) moves Shane (Jake Lacy) and Rachel (Alexandra Daddario) into the Pineapple Suite free of charge. Rachel is taken aback when Kitty (Molly Shannon) downplays her role, indicating that she might become a trophy wife, and later Kitty advises her to "be happy". Over breakfast, Mark annoys Paula, who is mixed race, by insensitively talking about the nature of colonialism, wealth and privilege, and asking rhetorically "should we all just feel shitty about ourselves?". Feeling that the Mossbachers were benefiting from the theft of his culture, Paula meets with Kai and gives him the code to their safe, which contains a pair of expensive bracelets, to pay for a lawsuit against the hotel. Kai reluctantly agrees to do it. Belinda (Natasha Rothwell) tries to talk with Tanya about their wellness business, but Tanya is more concerned about meeting with Greg (Jon Gries).

As the Mossbachers prepare to go scuba diving in the ocean, Nicole chooses to leave, screaming her frustrations at not feeling respected, forcing Mark to follow her and leaving Paula, Olivia and Quinn on the boat. She returns to the hotel, unaware that Kai is also there to steal the bracelets. He covers his face and attacks her. Mark suddenly arrives and tackles him. Kai punches him in the face and escapes from the room. The police arrive at the scene, with Armond promising to pay for the Mossbachers' stay as a compensation. At dinner, Quinn and Olivia express admiration for Mark's actions, earning him their respect. Paula remains silent, and Olivia suspects that she might have been involved. Tanya tries to break up with Greg, but he wants to stay with her. Armond and Belinda share a disappointed drink, reflecting on the events of the last few days. At their room, Rachel tells Shane that she made a huge mistake marrying him, right after removing her rings.

== Production ==
=== Development ===
In June 2021, HBO announced that the fifth episode of the season would be titled "The Lotus-Eaters", and that it would be written and directed by series creator Mike White. This was White's fifth writing and directorial credit for the series.

== Reception ==
=== Viewers ===
In its original American broadcast, "The Lotus-Eaters" was seen by an estimated 0.541 million household viewers with a 0.1 in the 18-49 demographics. This means that 0.1 percent of all households with televisions watched the episode. This was a slight increase from the previous episode, which was watched by 0.515 million household viewers with a 0.1 in the 18-49 demographics.

=== Critical reviews ===
"The Lotus-Eaters" received extremely positive reviews from critics. Roxana Hadadi of The A.V. Club gave the episode an "A" grade and wrote, "Money is the elixir, the ambrosia, the manna upon which the White Lotus guests feast, and yes, this has come up over and over again during Mike White's preceding four episodes, but it takes on a grimier weight in penultimate episode 'The Lotus-Eaters.'"

Amanda Whiting of Vulture gave the episode a 4 star rating out of 5 and wrote, "These are 'The Lotus-eaters' of Armond's oratorical flourish, when he joins Belinda to finish off a bottle of white, compliments of Tanya. It's a dark coda to an episode that shifts the series's tonal register."

Alex Noble of TheWrap wrote, "Well, we are over halfway through HBO's limited series The White Lotus and we still have the same number of potential murder victims (and suspects) as we started with. Given that the series finale is next weekend, I'm thinking we'll finally have some answers sooner rather than later though." Breeze Riley of Telltale TV gave the episode a 4 star rating out of 5 and wrote, "The characters on The White Lotus who end up losing are the ones who never held much power to begin with like Paula or Belinda. If the people with power aren't the ones learning the lessons, they continue to leave destruction in their wake. The ones without power are left picking up the pieces."

=== Accolades ===
Connie Britton submitted the episode to support her Outstanding Supporting Actress in a Limited or Anthology Series or Movie nomination at the 74th Primetime Emmy Awards. She would lose the award to her co-star, Jennifer Coolidge.
