= Arrivals (The White Lotus) =

- The White Lotus episode
- Rachel and Shane Patton in the hotel
- Episode no.: Season 1 Episode 1
- Directed by: Mike White
- Written by: Mike White
- Cinematography by: Ben Kutchins
- Editing by: Heather Persons
- Original release date: July 11, 2021
- Running time: 54 minutes

Guest appearances
- Jolene Purdy as Lani; Kekoa Scott Kekumano as Kai; Lukas Gage as Dillon

Episode chronology
← Previous —	Next → "New Day"
- The White Lotus season 1

"Arrivals" is the series premiere of the American black comedy drama anthology television series The White Lotus. The episode was written and directed by series creator Mike White. It originally aired on HBO on July 11, 2021.

The series follows the guests and employees of the fictional White Lotus resort chain. The season is set on Maui, and follows two couples, the Pattons and the Mossbachers, along with a woman named Tanya, as they each have different conflicts during their stay.

According to Nielsen Media Research, the episode was seen by an estimated 0.420 million household viewers and gained a 0.1 ratings share among adults aged 18–49. The series premiere received critical acclaim, with critics praising the cast's performances, characters and themes.

== Plot ==
At Kahului Airport on Maui, Shane Patton (Jake Lacy) is waiting for his flight. An older couple (Mark Kamine and Tana Kamine) engage him in conversation, and he tells them he has just spent his honeymoon at the island's White Lotus resort. They mention that a person was found dead at the resort. When they ask about the whereabouts of his wife, he rudely rebuffs them, walks away, and stares out the window, where he sees a box containing human remains being loaded onto an airplane.

One week earlier, Shane and his wife Rachel (Alexandra Daddario) board a ferry to the White Lotus. Joining them as the new guests are Mark (Steve Zahn) and Nicole Mossbacher (Connie Britton), with their children, the sixteen year old Quinn (Fred Hechinger) and college sophomore Olivia (Sydney Sweeney), who has brought her friend Paula (Brittany O'Grady). The girls amuse themselves making snide remarks about other guests. Another new guest is Tanya McQuoid (Jennifer Coolidge), a highly strung middle aged woman who has arrived with her mother's ashes. They are welcomed by Armond (Murray Bartlett), the manager; Lani (Jolene Purdy), his pregnant employee; and Belinda Lindsey (Natasha Rothwell), the spa manager. As the day begins, Lani realizes that her baby will be born soon, and her water breaks, although she does not disclose it to Armond as she fears getting fired on her first day.

Shane is annoyed to discover that they were not given the special room for their honeymoon, which was paid by his parents. He complains to Armond, who claims they never booked the suite, which is now occupied by a German couple. This frustrates Rachel, as she feels he is not enjoying their honeymoon. Rachel strikes up a conversation with Paula and Olivia, who mock her listicle writing profession and make her feel uncomfortable. Mark is awaiting medical results for the following day, believing that he has testicular cancer. Per his wife's advice, he decides to spend more time with Quinn, who is preoccupied with his phone and tablet. Eventually they decide to go snorkeling. Tanya is unable to get a spa massage, but Belinda instead performs a ceremonial chant, which calms her down.

That night, Armond is informed that Lani is giving birth at his office. As he has doctors tend Lani, Armond laments that he had no idea she was pregnant, thinking she was just overweight. Mark is finally called by the doctor, but he is left without answer when they lose their phone connection. At their suite, Shane and Rachel decide to leave aside the problem with the booking, and proceed to have sex.

== Production ==
=== Development ===
In June 2021, HBO announced that the first episode of the season would be titled "Arrival", and that it would be written and directed by series creator Mike White.

== Reception ==
=== Viewers ===
In its original American broadcast, "Arrivals" was seen by an estimated 0.420 million household viewers with a 0.1 in the 18-49 demographics. This means that 0.1 percent of all households with televisions watched the episode.

=== Critical reviews ===
"Arrivals" received critical acclaim. Roxana Hadadi of The A.V. Club gave the episode an "A" grade and wrote, "The White Lotus jumps immediately into the deep end of that conversation with premiere episode 'Arrivals', which gives us a glimpse into the bitingly acerbic tone Mike White is going to cultivate over the miniseries' six episodes. There are a fair amount of LOL moments in this first hour, but I'm not sure I felt good after them. Whatever amusement The White Lotus provided on a scene-to-scene basis in 'Arrivals' was followed immediately by a kind of lingering bitterness — the way you feel an ache in your jaw after eating something very sour or very tart."

Amanda Whiting of Vulture gave the episode a perfect 5 star rating out of 5 and wrote, "In the premiere episode of his HBO miniseries The White Lotus, Mike White manages the full-body cringe of a comedy of manners, the tension of an Agatha Christie mystery, Nora Ephron's eye for rich-people things, plus an unrelenting class consciousness that drives the plot and most of the punch lines."

Alex Noble of TheWrap wrote, "The episode ends on a comically foreboding note, the champagne problems bubbling up in the ritzy guest rooms in sharp contrast to the drama playing out in Armond's office below. The show's satirical vibe (via White's keen eye for social nuances) is already abundantly clear, even if the plot that's to unfold is decidedly not." Breeze Riley of Telltale TV gave the episode a 4 star rating out of 5 and wrote, "Although the first episode doesn't dig too deeply into each character since it's too busy introducing them all, there's plenty of development left to mine throughout the season."

=== Accolades ===
The episode received a nomination for Outstanding Contemporary Costumes at the 74th Primetime Creative Arts Emmy Awards, losing to Hacks.
