= The White Lotus season 1 =

Season of television series

The White Lotus
- Season 1
- Promotional poster
- Showrunner: Mike White
- Starring: Murray Bartlett; Connie Britton; Jennifer Coolidge; Alexandra Daddario; Fred Hechinger; Jake Lacy; Brittany O'Grady; Natasha Rothwell; Sydney Sweeney; Steve Zahn; Molly Shannon
- No. of episodes: 6

Release
- Original network: HBO
- Original release: July 11 – August 15, 2021

Season chronology
- Next → Season 2

The first season of The White Lotus, an American satirical comedy drama anthology television series created, written, and directed by Mike White, premiered on HBO on July 11, 2021. The season was greenlit in October 2020 as a limited series, filmed in Hawaii in late 2020, and has an ensemble cast of Murray Bartlett, Connie Britton, Jennifer Coolidge, Alexandra Daddario, Fred Hechinger, Jake Lacy, Brittany O'Grady, Natasha Rothwell, Sydney Sweeney, Steve Zahn, and Molly Shannon. The season has six episodes, and follows the lives of the staff and wealthy guests at a tropical resort in Hawaii.

The season received critical acclaim: eleven nominations at the 74th Primetime Emmy Awards and nine at the Primetime Creative Arts Emmy Awards, resulting in ten wins across both ceremonies. Despite being developed as a limited series, on August 10, 2021, HBO renewed it for a second season, making it an anthology series. The second season premiered on October 30, 2022.

== Cast and characters ==
=== Main ===
- Murray Bartlett as Armond, the confident manager of the White Lotus resort who is also a recovering drug addict who has been clean for five years
- Connie Britton as Nicole Mossbacher, the CFO of a search engine company and Mark's wife
- Jennifer Coolidge as Tanya McQuoid, a troubled woman whose mother recently died
- Alexandra Daddario as Rachel, a journalist newly wed to Shane
- Fred Hechinger as Quinn Mossbacher, Nicole and Mark's socially awkward son
- Jake Lacy as Shane Patton, a real estate agent and Rachel's husband
- Brittany O'Grady as Paula, Olivia's friend from college
- Natasha Rothwell as Belinda Lindsey, the resort's spa manager
- Sydney Sweeney as Olivia Mossbacher, Nicole and Mark's sardonic daughter who is a college sophomore
- Steve Zahn as Mark Mossbacher, Nicole's husband who is dealing with a health crisis
- Molly Shannon as Kitty, (Note: Shannon only appears in episodes 4 and 5, but is credited as starring) Shane's mother

=== Recurring ===
- Lukas Gage as Dillon, a staffer at the White Lotus
- Kekoa Scott Kekumano as Kai, a staffer at the White Lotus who forms a connection with Paula
- Alec Merlino as Hutch, a waiter at the White Lotus
- Jon Gries as Greg, a White Lotus guest who connects with Tanya

=== Guest ===
- Jolene Purdy as Lani, a trainee at the White Lotus

== Episodes ==
No. overall	No. in season	Title	Directed by	Written by	Original release date	U.S. viewers (millions)
1	1	"Arrivals"	Mike White	Mike White	July 11, 2021	0.420
Shane Patton watches as a box containing human remains is loaded onto an airplane. Seven days earlier, wealthy patrons arrive at the White Lotus resort on Maui. They are greeted by manager Armond and his pregnant employee, Lani. Shane and his new wife, Rachel, arrive for their honeymoon, but he becomes fixated on a booking error. Tanya McQuoid, who came to spread her mother's ashes, wants to schedule a massage, but it is fully booked. Belinda Lindsey, the spa's manager, instead guides her in a ceremonial chant. Tech CFO Nicole Mossbacher argues with her husband Mark about his potential cancer diagnosis; Mark decides to spend time with their son Quinn. Their daughter Olivia and her friend Paula lounge by the pool and make snide remarks about Rachel, a professional listicle writer. Lani's water breaks, but Armond does not notice. She begins to give birth in his office as the guests dine. Mark receives a call from his doctor, but is disconnected before he learns his diagnosis. Rachel and Shane agree to put the day's conflict behind them and resume their earlier tryst.
2	2	"New Day"	Mike White	Mike White	July 18, 2021	0.459
Mark is elated to hear he does not have cancer, but learns from his uncle that his father died of AIDS, having been secretly gay. Shane calls his mother to have their travel agent reprimand Armond over the booking error. Rachel considers accepting a new writing assignment, but Shane insists she should not. Rachel meets Nicole, who advises her to maintain her independence, but criticizes Rachel's reporting after realizing she wrote a listicle mentioning her, causing Rachel to doubt her career. Upon Shane's insistence, Rachel abandons the job. Olivia and Paula use ketamine on the beach, but are approached by Tanya and leave, forgetting Paula's bag. The bag is turned over to Armond, who keeps it and uses the drugs it contains to manage his stress despite being a recovering addict. Olivia becomes jealous when she sees Paula flirting with Kai, a hotel employee. Tanya invites Belinda to dinner and offers to fund a possible wellness business, which Belinda considers. When Quinn leaves the hotel room because Olivia doesn't want to share a bedroom with him, he goes to the beach, where he is fascinated by watching a group of whales jumping in the ocean.
3	3	"Mysterious Monkeys"	Mike White	Mike White	July 25, 2021	0.478
As the guests of the White Lotus wake for the day, Paula hesitates about pursuing her fling with Kai due to Olivia's increased suspicions, while Quinn's electronics are washed away as he sleeps on the beach. Shane and Rachel have sex, but Rachel worries whether their marriage is predicated on Shane's sexual attraction to her. To console her, Shane plans a romantic dinner. Annoyed by Shane's incessant complaining, Armond recommends a sunset boat ride, withholding the fact that Tanya chartered it to spread her mother's ashes in the ocean. Tanya believes the honeymooners are supporting her, and the situation enrages Shane. Mark remains distraught about his father's secret life, and gets drunk while having awkward encounters with his son, Rachel, and other women at the bar. This culminates in a tepid speech when he joins his family for dinner, and Nicole rebuffs him when he tries to initiate sex. Armond spirals after relapsing from his five-year sobriety, drinking and taking Paula's prescription medication. He tries to flirt with hotel staffer Dillon, and tells Mark he is gay, even propositioning Mark when he expresses curiosity about anal sex. As the guests return to bed, Olivia follows Paula and sees her and Kai have sex.
4	4	"Recentering"	Mike White	Mike White	August 1, 2021	0.515
Quinn wakes on the beach again to see Hawaiians singing and bringing their canoe ashore. He introduces himself later that afternoon. Tanya tells the girls that the staff has Paula's backpack, and when they confront Armond, he decides to give it back, drugs and all, but after Shane angrily demands to speak with Armond's boss, a livid Armond takes the drugs and returns the backpack without them. Tanya and Belinda plan to have dinner together to discuss the wellness center, but Tanya cancels when she is asked out by Greg, a sport fisherman staying in the room next to hers. Kitty, Shane's mother, arrives at the hotel, to Rachel's chagrin. Mark reveals to Quinn that he cheated on Nicole. At dinner, Quinn carelessly reveals this information in front of Nicole. Armond invites Dillon to his office to take drugs and have sex, in exchange for preferred work shifts. When Shane learns that Armond gave him a fake number for his boss, he storms into the manager's office and finds Armond performing anilingus on Dillon.
5	5	"The Lotus-Eaters"	Mike White	Mike White	August 8, 2021	0.541
After Shane catches him having sex with Dillon, Armond moves Shane and Rachel into the Pineapple Suite free of charge to avoid repercussions. Rachel begins to worry that she has become a trophy wife after talking with Kitty and second-guesses marrying Shane. Belinda tries to get Tanya to look at her business proposal, but Tanya is preoccupied by Greg's interest in her. Tanya tells Greg she is an emotional wreck, but Greg is undeterred. Quinn enjoys paddling with a group of locals. Paula gives Kai the code to the Mossbachers' safe and convinces him to steal a pair of expensive bracelets to pay for a lawsuit against the hotel. Nicole rebukes Mark for confessing his affair to Quinn. As the Mossbachers prepare to go scuba diving, Nicole breaks down over the pressure of having to provide for her family and receiving no respect for it. She returns to the hotel, with Mark following. Kai is in their room trying to steal the bracelets. Seeing Nicole beg Kai not to hurt her, Mark charges at him, but Kai pummels him and escapes. The hotel comps their stay and Mark finally gets respect from Nicole and their children, but Olivia is suspicious that Paula is involved with the robbery.
6	6	"Departures"	Mike White	Mike White	August 15, 2021	0.850
Rachel tells Shane that she regrets marrying him. Tanya decides to pursue her relationship with Greg and tells Belinda she wants to end her dependency on transactional relationships, leaving her a large sum of cash instead. Dejected, Belinda discards her business plan. Kai is arrested and the Mossbachers' stolen jewelry is recovered, confirming Olivia's suspicions about Paula. Paula admits her involvement in the robbery to Olivia, but accuses her of being as privileged as the rest of her family. The two later reconcile when Paula expresses her regret. Quinn tells his parents he wants to stay on the island to join the local canoeists, which they dismiss outright. Shane hears of the robbery from the Mossbachers and calls his travel agent, who informs Armond's superior. This gets Armond fired. Armond spends his last workday getting heavily intoxicated on Olivia and Paula's remaining drugs. That night, after serving dinner, he sneaks into Shane's suite and defecates in his suitcase. Shane returns before Armond leaves, and, sensing an intruder, arms himself with a pineapple knife and inadvertently stabs Armond, killing him. Armond's body is loaded onto the guests' return flight. Rachel arrives at the airport and tells Shane she is happy after all. Quinn leaves the airport to stay in Hawaii after the rest of his family boards the plane.

== Production ==
=== Development ===
On October 19, 2020, HBO gave The White Lotus a limited series order that consisted of six episodes. The series was created, written and directed by Mike White. White also serves as executive producer alongside David Bernad and Nick Hall. Mark Kamine serves as the co-executive producer. In an interview with Ben Travers of IndieWire at the 2021 ATX Television Festival, White said he had wanted to explore the question of "how money can pervert even our most intimate relationships", examine the "ethics of vacationing in other people's realities", and present the "flesh and blood" experience of being gripped by the power dynamics of "today's culture wars".

Following the first season's critical acclaim and viewership numbers, the show was renewed as an anthology series, with each season telling the stories of a different group of travelers during their stay at a White Lotus property.

=== Filming ===
Principal photography for season one began in October 2020 in Hawaii under COVID-19 guidelines. By November 21, 2020, the series was halfway through filming at the Four Seasons Resort Maui at Wailea and was scheduled to film in December at locations around Maui, including Lānaʻi, where some beach scenes were shot. Zahn told The Hollywood Reporter that the Four Seasons was closed during filming, which created a bubble for the cast and crew. Both he and Hechinger got PADI certified for the scuba scenes. Ben Kutchins served as director of photography for the season.

=== Casting ===
Upon the limited series order announcement, Murray Bartlett, Connie Britton, Jennifer Coolidge, Alexandra Daddario, Fred Hechinger, Jake Lacy, Brittany O'Grady, Natasha Rothwell, Sydney Sweeney, and Steve Zahn were cast. On October 30, 2020, Molly Shannon, Jon Gries, Jolene Purdy, Kekoa Kekumano, and Lukas Gage joined the cast in recurring roles. Alec Merlino, who was a fellow contestant with White on Survivor: David vs. Goliath, was cast as Hutch, a waiter.

=== Music ===
White hired Chilean composer Cristobal Tapia de Veer to score the season. The theme, "Aloha!", was composed to evoke sounds of the jungle. Tapia de Veer used unusual methods, including over-blowing into a flute and performing squawking vocal noises and "monkey sounds" himself. He also used a South American charango, a dozen or so drums from different cultures (mostly handmade drums made of wood and animal skin), a variety of natural shakers, and some piano.

=== Budget ===
According to Vulture, the production cost for the season was under US$3 million per episode.

== Release ==
The season premiered on July 11, 2021, on HBO and HBO Max. In the United Kingdom and the Republic of Ireland, the season premiered on Sky Atlantic on August 16, 2021.

=== Home media ===
The season was released on DVD on September 13, 2022.

== Reception ==
=== Critical response ===
Review aggregator Rotten Tomatoes reported an approval rating of 90% for the first season of The White Lotus based on 97 critic reviews, with an average rating of 8.4/10. The website's critical consensus reads, "Though its true intentions can get a bit murky, gorgeous vistas, twisty drama, and a pitch perfect cast make The White Lotus a compelling—if uncomfortable—viewing destination." On Metacritic, the season has a score of 82 out of 100 based on 39 critics, indicating "universal acclaim".

Matthew Jacobs of TV Guide rated it 4.5 out of 5 and wrote that it was "some of the year's best television thus far." Rolling Stone's Alan Sepinwall graded it 3.5 out of 5 stars and called it "frequently uncomfortable, sometimes poetic, occasionally hilarious, and deeply idiosyncratic throughout." White's attention to character detail was praised, with Naomi Fry of The New Yorker lauding his "affection for his characters, who never feel like caricatures", and Judy Berman of Time calling him "uniquely attuned to characters' internal conflicts as well as their varying level of self-awareness."The New York Times's James Poniewozik commended White's balance of "sardonic and sincere" tones and his "ear for how people can weaponize idealism", but also said the writing "sometimes strains to be topical, with its culture-war Mad Libs references to triggering and cucking, canceling and doxxing."

The performances of the ensemble cast were widely praised, with Roxana Hadadi of RogerEbert.com giving the season four stars out of four and writing that it has a "combination of performances that are nearly universally enthralling." Of the character Armond, Poniewozik wrote Bartlett shows "the invisible gymnastics that go into this job" and plays him like "a coiled spring". Hadadi lauded Rothwell's "nuanced, elastic work" with a "haunting" final onscreen moment. Berman said Coolidge was poised to be the series' breakout but also praised Zahn, Bartlett, Rothwell, Lacy, Sweeney, and Daddario.

Some critics lamented that the nonwhite, native Hawaiian characters who work at the resort, such as Lani and Kai, received little screen time and were the least developed characters. In this way, critics argued the show did not sufficiently engage the issue it seemed poised to critique—the privileges of the affluent, white upper class. Poniewozik felt the show "could use more attention to the downstairs half of its upstairs-downstairs story; it flicks at, but doesn't really explore, the lives of the native Hawaiian staff busing tables and performing dinnertime rituals" for the guests. Mitchell Kuga of Vox wrote, "scraping at imperialism, The White Lotus mimes a moral center but never engages the topic beyond mere gesture...how successful can a piece of satire be if it replicates the very power structures it purports to satirize?" White has said the intention of giving native characters less screen time was to show how "interchangeable" the workers appear to the more privileged.

Inkoo Kang of The Washington Post said the characters and performances "make for a twisty, queasy, sweatily claustrophobic drama" but that next to other popular TV shows centered on white, affluent people, such as Succession, Big Little Lies, The Undoing, and The Crown, The White Lotus had nothing new "to observe about the trail of casual destruction the moneyed and connected can leave in their unhappy wake." In The Observer, Kyle Turner wrote, "as someone who is very fond of White's usually tender, deft hand at balancing tone", he had hoped the show would have "more precision in its aimed poisoned arrows." Turner added that the show was "too broad to be a good satire, too pointedly critical to be a straight tragedy, too invested in its melodrama to be a broad comedy, until it becomes ouroborosian in its indecision on tone and ethos. It's not that these genres and tropes can't coexist. It's that here, they float adrift, devoid of alchemical balance."

Critics were divided about the season one finale, with Kang saying the "swerve late in the series disappointingly sails the story toward calmer waters. Once the turbulence is over, only froth remains." Other critics, such as Emily St. James of Vox, argued that what they considered the anticlimactic ending was precisely the point of the show and underscored White's commentary on the powerful and the privileged.

The season appeared in the top ten on numerous publications' "Best of 2021" lists, including first in The A.V. Club, The Globe and Mail, The Ringer, Slant Magazine, and The Sunday Times; second in The Boston Globe, Decider, Exclaim!, The Guardian, The Independent, New York Daily News, San Antonio Express-News, Sioux City Journal, Time, and Vulture; and third in Good Morning America, NME, and Uproxx, among others.

=== Viewership ===
The first season of The White Lotus ranked highest among all series on HBO Max and achieved consistent week-over-week growth for both the premiere and digital audience.

More specifically, the second episode showed a 9.29% increase in premiere ratings from the first episode, while the third episode saw a 4.14% increase, the fourth episode a 7.74% increase, the fifth episode a 5.05% increase, and the finale a 57.12% increase, the largest ratings increase in the season. The first season also reached an average of 544,000 viewers in ratings.

=== Ratings ===
Viewership and ratings per episode of The White Lotus season 1
No.	Title	Air date	Rating (18–49)	Viewers (millions)	DVR (18–49)	DVR viewers (millions)	Total (18–49)	Total viewers (millions)
1	"Arrivals"	July 11, 2021	0.08	0.420	0.04	0.198	0.12	0.618
2	"New Day"	July 18, 2021	0.06	0.459	0.06	0.298	0.12	0.757
3	"Mysterious Monkeys"	July 25, 2021	0.11	0.478	0.08	0.392	0.19	0.870
4	"Recentering"	August 1, 2021	0.14	0.515	—N/a	—N/a	—N/a	—N/a
5	"The Lotus-Eaters"	August 8, 2021	0.11	0.541	—N/a	—N/a	—N/a	—N/a
6	"Departures"	August 15, 2021	0.2	0.850	—N/a	—N/a	—N/a	—N/a

=== Accolades ===
The season received 11 nominations at the 74th Primetime Emmy Awards in the limited or anthology series categories. It was also nominated for nine Primetime Creative Arts Emmy Awards across eight categories, winning five. The season won the most Emmys that year across both ceremonies, including Outstanding Limited or Anthology Series, Murray Bartlett for Primetime Emmy Award for Outstanding Supporting Actor, Jennifer Coolidge for Outstanding Supporting Actress, and Mike White for both Outstanding Directing and Outstanding Writing. Connie Britton, Alexandra Daddario, Jake Lacy, Natasha Rothwell, Sydney Sweeney, and Steve Zahn also received acting nominations.
