= Shanghai Ghetto (film) =

- Theatrical release poster
- Directed by: Amir Mann; Dana Janklowicz-Mann
- Produced by: Rebel Child Productions
- Narrated by: Martin Landau
- Edited by: Amir Mann; Dana Janklowicz-Mann
- Music by: Sujin Nam
- Distributed by: Menemsha Entertainment
- Release date: February 28, 2002
- Running time: 95 minutes
- Country: United States
- Languages: English; German; Mandarin
- Box office: $712,446

Shanghai Ghetto is a 2002 documentary film produced and directed by Dana Janklowicz-Mann and Amir Mann. Narrated by Martin Landau, the film chronicles the story of Jewish refugees fleeing Nazi Germany in the 1930s and their lives in the Shanghai Ghetto.

The film was awarded the Audience Choice Award and the Human Rights Award at the 2002 Santa Barbara International Film Festival.
