= The Fifth Patient =

- The Fifth Patient DVD cover
- Directed by: Amir Mann
- Written by: Amir Mann
- Produced by: Shoreline Entertainment
- Starring: Nick Chinlund; Isaach De Bankolé; Brendan Fehr; Marley Shelton
- Cinematography: Ben Kutchins
- Edited by: Ryan Rothmaier
- Music by: Sujin Nam
- Distributed by: Shoreline Entertainment
- Release date: June 10, 2007
- Running time: 95 minutes
- Country: United States
- Language: English

The Fifth Patient is a 2007 American thriller film written and directed by Amir Mann, and starring Nick Chinlund and Marley Shelton. The film was shot in the United States and Mexico, and released on June 10, 2007.

== Premise ==
John Reilly, an American national, finds himself in an African hospital where, he learns he has spent the last two years due to a head injury. He remembers nothing of his past and is accused of being a spy. The film features Helen, a woman Reilly believes might be his wife.

== Cast and characters ==
- Nick Chinlund – John Reilly
- Isaach De Bankolé – Cpt. Mugambe
- Brendan Fehr – Vince Callow
- Marley Shelton – Helen
- Harsh Nayyar – Apu
- Edi Gathegi – Darudi
- Alec Newman – Dr. Stevenson
- Olek Krupa – Khodorov
- Henry Czerny – Gerard Pinker
- Peter Bogdanovich – Edward Birani

== Production ==
The film is Amir Mann's first feature.

== Release ==
The film was internationally distributed, as El quint paciente in Spanish, O quinto paciente in Portuguese, for example.

== Reception ==
Las Vegas Weekly stated: "This is an immediate and engrossing set-up, similar to the basic template for plenty of thrillers, and it lends The Fifth Patient a certain momentum that lasts more than halfway through the film, until writer-director Mann starts providing some answers about why exactly his main character (Chinlund) is in Africa, and what his mysterious tormentors and/or allies are trying to get out of him. As the possible spy begins to regain bits and pieces of his memory, along the way becoming more confident in his own espionage skills, the film resembles The Bourne Identity on a smaller scale." A review in Variety also found that "the guessing games lose their intrigue since the underlying mystery is suspiciously thin".The Hollywood Reporter too judged that the film was " for the first hour at least a taut, claustrophobic mystery".

== See also ==
- List of American films of 2007
