= Jolene Purdy =

American actress

- Occupation: Actress
- Years active: 2001–present
- Spouse: Chuck Brandt
- Children: 1

Jolene Purdy is an American actress. Purdy starred as Cherita Chen in the 2001 film Donnie Darko. Among her television credits is the Fox sitcom Do Not Disturb, which debuted in 2008, as well as the ABC Family comedy series 10 Things I Hate About You, playing Mandella in eight episodes. Purdy has also guest starred on Judging Amy and Boston Public. Purdy is also known for her role as Piper Katins on the TeenNick drama series Gigantic. She had a recurring role in the Netflix drama series Orange Is The New Black as well as Marvel's WandaVision.

== Early life ==
Her mother is Japanese American and her father is English, Scottish, Irish, German, at least one eighth Ashkenazi Jewish. She is Yonsei, a great-grandchild of Japanese immigrants. She has sisters. She and her husband, Chuck Brandt, have a daughter.

As of 2017, she resides in Southern California.

== Film ==
Year	Title	Role	Notes
2001	Donnie Darko	Cherita Chen	Film
2023	Unseen	Sam	Film
2024	Empire Waist	Mrs. Hall	

== Television ==
Year	Title	Role	Notes
2001	Boston Public	Cindy Lavin	Episode: "Chapter Twenty-Three"
2002	Judging Amy		Episode: "Tidal Wave"
2008	Do Not Disturb	Molly Poleski	5 episodes
2009–10	10 Things I Hate About You	Mandella	8 episodes
2010–11	Gigantic	Piper Katins	Main role, 18 episodes
2010	Breaking Bad	Cara	Episode: "Green Light"
2011	Glee	Ronnie	3 episodes
2012	Raising Hope	Venom	Episode: "Mrs. Smartypants"
2013–14	Under the Dome	Dodee Weaver	Main role (Season 1), Guest (Season 2); 9 episodes
2014	Benched	Micah	Main role
2015	Hand of God	Denise	Episode: "Your Inside Voice"
2016–17	Orange Is the New Black	Stephanie Hapakuka	Recurring Role, 19 episodes
2017	Hawaii Five-0	Chloe Gordon	Episode: "Mohala I Ka Wai Ka Maka O Ka Pua"
2018	Superstore	Amber	Episode: "Video Game Release"
2018	The Resident	Olivia Tan	2 episodes
2018	Teachers	Siobhan	Episode: "Leggo My Preggo"
2019	The Magicians	Shoshana	3 episodes
2020	Royalties	Member of Kimmy's Team (uncredited)	Episode: "Kick Your Shoes Off"
2021	WandaVision	Isabel Matsueida / "Beverly"	Recurring
2021	The White Lotus	Lani	Episode: "Arrivals"
2022	Firefly Lane	Justine Jordan	4 episodes
2025	The Bondsman	Midge Kusatsu	Main Role, 8 Episodes
2026	9-1-1: Nashville	Carla	Episode: "Spirit of the Games"
TBA	Flipping Out †	Jolene	Also executive producer

== See also ==
- History of the Japanese in Los Angeles
