= Amir Mann =

Israeli film-maker

Amir Mann (Hebrew: אמיר מן) is an Israeli film-maker. Mann attended the Tisch School of the Arts at New York University. He met his future wife Dana Janklowicz-Mann while at NYU. Together they formed Rebel Child Productions, an independent film production company and became filmmaking partners.

Mann co-directed, produced, and edited the 2002 documentary film Shanghai Ghetto with his wife, Dana Janklowicz-Mann. They shared the Audience Choice Award and the Human Rights Award at the 2002 Santa Barbara International Film Festival. Mann also co-wrote an episode of the 2002 revival of The Twilight Zone television series.

As head writer on the Netflix series Fauda, he and his writing team won the 2017 Israeli Television Academy's award for Best Script in a Drama Series.

== Filmography ==
- Fauda (2017–2018)
- The Fifth Patient (2007)
- Shanghai Ghetto (2002)
- Menace (2001)
- Warsaw Story (1996)
- Band of Spies (2025)
