= Brittany O'Grady =

American actress (born 1996)

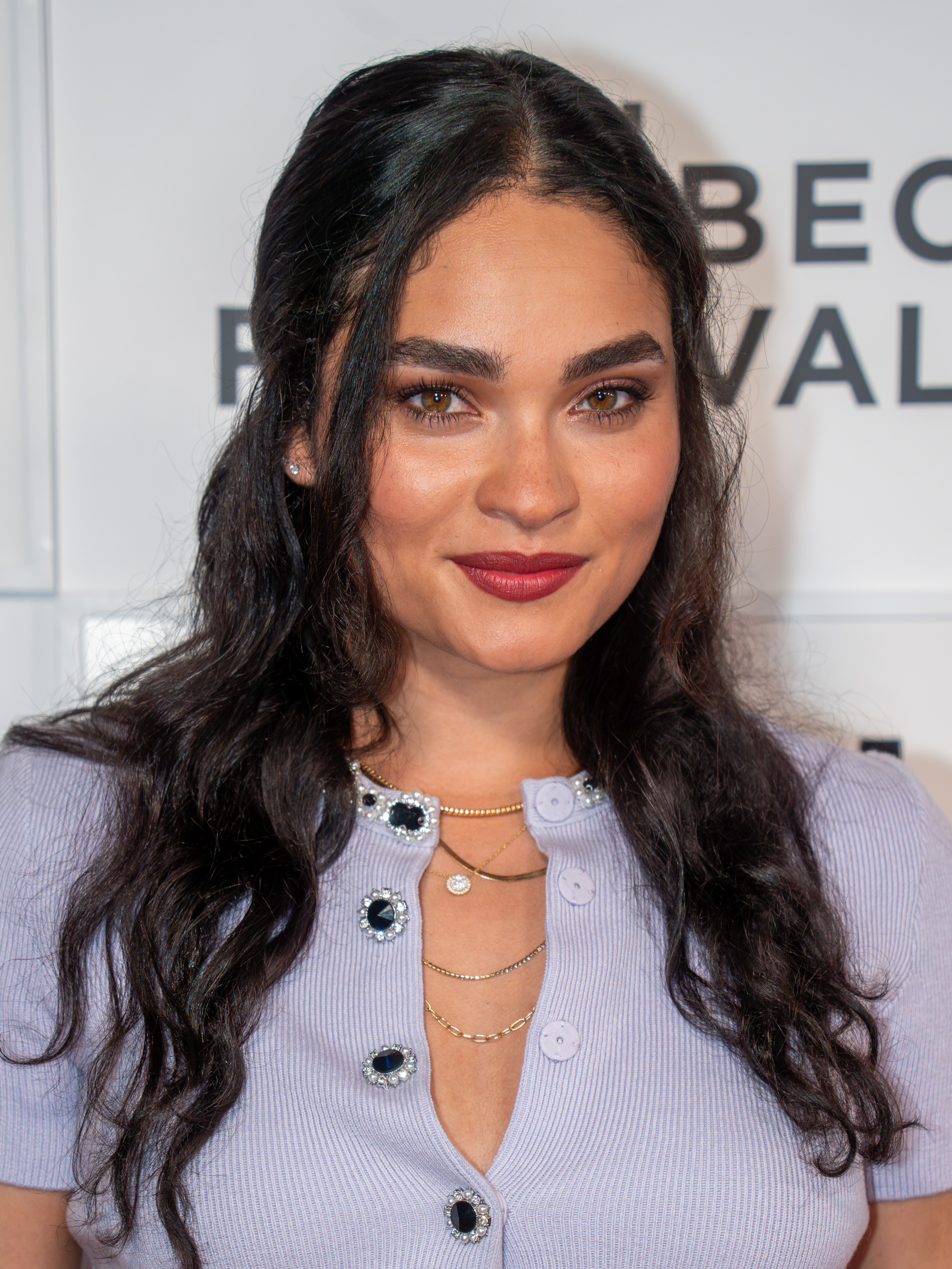
- O'Grady at the 2025 Tribeca Festival
- Born: Brittany Ann O'Grady; June 2, 1996 (age 30); Arlington, Virginia, U.S.
- Occupations: Actress; singer
- Years active: 2014–present
- Notable work: Little Voice; Star; Black Christmas; The White Lotus; The Consultant
- Spouse: Ben Huyard (m. 2022)

Brittany Ann O'Grady (born June 2, 1996) is an American actress and singer. She is known for her leading roles in the Fox series Star (2016–2019), the Apple TV+ series Little Voice (2020), the first season of the HBO anthology series The White Lotus (2021), and the Amazon Prime series The Consultant (2023). She also appeared in the 2019 film Black Christmas.

== Early life and education ==
Brittany O'Grady was born on June 2, 1996, in Arlington, Virginia to father Mike O'Grady, who has Irish ancestry, and mother Monqiue O'Grady, who is African-American with Creole roots from New Orleans. O'Grady's mother was a television reporter. Due to being mixed race, she says her Irish last name sometimes throws people off. She has spoken in interviews about the challenges of navigating stereotypes and ignorance about what different races are expected to look like. O'Grady attended Washington-Liberty High School in Arlington, graduating one year early before moving to Los Angeles with her sister. She enrolled in Pepperdine University in Malibu in the spring of 2015 where she would meet her future husband Ben Huyard. However, she experienced a culture shock being mixed race at the private Christian university due to the bigotry and bullying among the student body. O'Grady felt that "There were times where other people did not see the value of me, maybe because I didn't look a certain way to them". O'Grady dropped out after three semesters once her acting career began to gain traction.

== Career ==
After appearing in several television shows, O'Grady landed her first main TV role in 2016 as Simone Davis on the musical series Star. She landed her first film roles in 2019 as Georgia Beale in Above Suspicion and Jesse Bolton-Sinclair in Black Christmas. In 2021, she starred as Paula in the HBO series The White Lotus. O'Grady starred in Kygo's "Love Me Now" music video as Kygo's love interest.

== Personal life ==
Brittany and her longtime boyfriend, Ben Huyard, married in 2022. Her Star castmates Ryan Destiny, Jude Demorest, and Amiyah Scott served as bridesmaids.

== Filmography ==
=== Film ===
Year	Title	Role	Notes	Ref.
2019	Above Suspicion	Georgia Beale		
2019	Black Christmas	Jesse Bolton-Sinclair		
2023	Sometimes I Think About Dying	Sophie		
2024	It's What's Inside	Shelby		
2024	In Our Blood	Emily Wyland		
2025	The Best You Can	Sammi		
2025	A House of Dynamite	Lily Baerington		
2026	Monitor	Maggie		
2026	Jumanji: Open World †	TBA	Post-production	
TBA	Green Bank †	TBA	Post-production	

=== Television ===
Year	Title	Role	Notes	Ref.
2014	Trophy Wife	Teen Girl	Episode: "The Punisher"	
2015	The Night Shift	Alicia	Episode: "Recovery"	
2015	The Messengers	Nadia Garcia	Recurring role, 11 episodes	
2016–2019	Star	Simone Davis	Main role	
2020	Little Voice	Bess Alice King	Main role	
2021	The White Lotus	Paula	Main role (season 1)	
2023	The Consultant	Elaine Hayman	Main role	
2024	Elsbeth	Mackenzie "Mac" Altman	Episode: "Devil's Night"	
2026	The Comeback	Gabrielle	Recurring role; 6 episodes	
