= Lukas Gage =

American actor (born 1995)

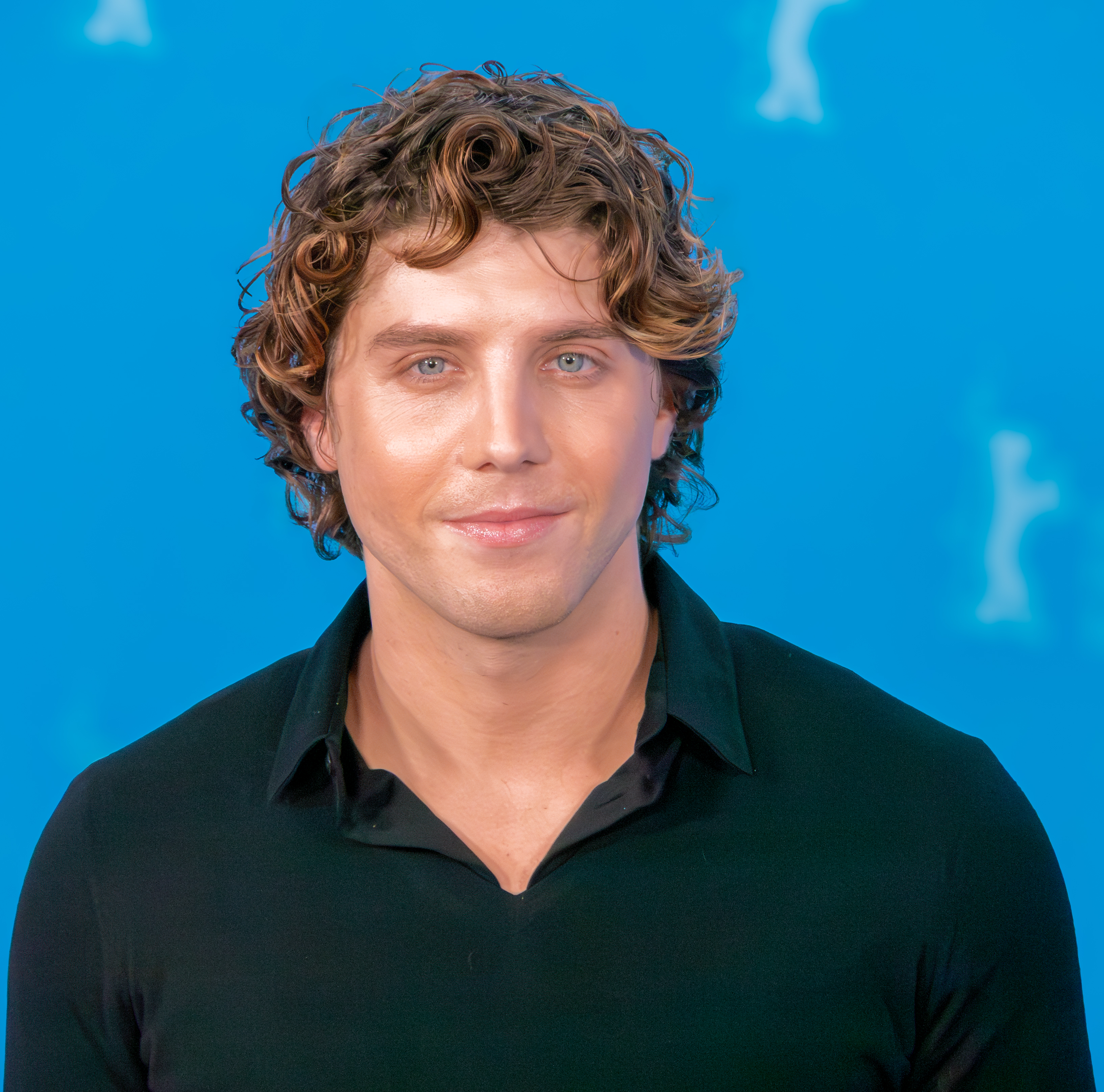
- Gage in 2026
- Born: May 28, 1995 (age 31); San Diego, California, U.S.
- Occupation: Actor
- Years active: 2012–present
- Spouse: Chris Appleton (m. 2023; div. 2024)

Lukas Gage (born May 28, 1995) is an American actor. He appeared in the television series American Vandal (2017), Euphoria (2019), The White Lotus (2021), You (2023), and Fargo (2023), as well as the films Smile 2 (2024) and Companion (2025).

== Early life ==
Gage was born on May 28, 1995, in San Diego, California, and raised in Encinitas, California. His father is from a Jewish family from New York. Gage went to film camp every summer and acted in plays and commercials. He attended San Dieguito Academy in Encinitas.

== Career ==
In November 2020, Gage posted a clip of an audition on Zoom during which director Tristram Shapeero could be heard criticizing Gage's apartment, unaware that his microphone was not muted. Gage received messages of support from others in the film industry. Although he did not get the job, the rejection allowed him to accept a part on the HBO miniseries The White Lotus.

Gage published his memoir I Wrote This for Attention in October 2025, making his writing debut.

== Personal life ==
Hairstylist Chris Appleton confirmed his relationship with Gage on The Drew Barrymore Show in March 2023, and early the following month the pair became engaged. Nineteen days later, Appleton and Gage were married. On November 13, 2023, Appleton filed for divorce from Gage, citing irreconcilable differences. In June 2024, the divorce was settled. In November 2025, Gage said about his sexuality: "I think I'm queer. Gay 90 percent, 10 percent straight. Can I say that? I don't know. Am I only with men? No. I don't know exactly what the label is for that. But mostly gay."

Gage revealed in his memoir that he has been diagnosed with borderline personality disorder.

== Filmography ==
†	Denotes works that have not yet been released

=== Film ===
Year	Title	Role	Notes	Ref.
2012	Elie's Overcoat	Itamar Wexler	Short film	
2014	Animals	Daniel	Short film	
2014	Satellite Beach	Big Dean's server	Short film	
2015	Scouts Guide to the Zombie Apocalypse	Travis		
2016	Sickhouse	Lukas		
2017	Sleep No More	Carter		
2018	Ace	Ace	Short film	
2018	Assassination Nation	Eric		
2019	Wyrm	Dylan		
2019	Deadcon	Ricky		
2020	What Breaks the Ice	Seth		
2020	Max Reload and the Nether Blasters	Seth		
2022	Moonshot	Dalton		
2022	How to Blow Up a Pipeline	Logan		
2023	Down Low	Cameron	Also writer	
2023	Parachute	Dalton		
2024	Road House	Billy		
2024	Smile 2	Lewis Fregoli		
2025	Companion	Patrick		
2026	People We Meet on Vacation	Buck		
2026	Rosebush Pruning	Robert		
2026	Love Language	Gus		
2026	Voicemails for Isabelle	Arthur		
TBA	Samo Lives †	TBA	Post-production	
TBA	Clashing Through the Snow †	TBA	Filming	
TBA	Pumping Black †	TBA	Filming	

=== Television ===
Year	Title	Role	Episode	Ref.
2013	Enlightened	Therapy Group Member	Episode: "Higher Power"	
2014	I Didn't Do It	Guy	Episode: "Ball or Nothing"	
2014	Kingdom	Skinner	Episode: "Piece of Plastic"	
2016–2018	Tagged	Brandon Darrow	Main role	
2017	Confess	Adam Taylor	2 episodes	
2017	Adam Ruins Everything	Cole Tyson	Episode: "Adam Ruins College"	
2017	American Vandal	Brandon Galloway	Recurring role	
2018	On My Block	Brad	Episode: "Chapter Four"	
2018	Class of Lies	Tiger	Recurring role	
2019	Supergirl	Kevin Huggins	Episode: "Blood Memory"	
2019	Veronica Mars	Cory	Episode: "Keep Calm and Party On"	
2019	Euphoria	Tyler Clarkson	Recurring role	
2019	Into the Dark	Logan	Episode: "Midnight Kiss"	
2020	Wireless	Jake	8 episodes	
2020–2021	Love, Victor	Derek	Recurring role (season 1); guest (season 2)	
2021	The White Lotus	Dillon	Recurring role (season 1)	
2022	Angelyne	Max Allen	Main role	
2022	Queer as Folk	Eric	Episode: "Problemática"	
2023	Gossip Girl	Himself	Episode: "I Am Gossip"	
2023	You	Adam Pratt	Main role (season 4)	
2023	The Other Two	Himself	Episode: "Cary & Brooke Go to an AIDS Play"	
2023	Fargo	Lars Olmstead	Recurring role	
2024	Dead Boy Detectives	Cat King	Recurring role	
2025–present	Overcompensating	Sammy	Recurring role	
