= Ben Kutchins =

American cinematographer

Ben Kutchins is an American cinematographer.

== Biography ==
Kutchins started his career with an internship at Industrial Light & Magic (ILM), rising to production assistant. Next he studied film at the New York University Tisch School of the Arts, then shot about 60 short films in two years, before working on indie films and was then hired to shoot the film Veronica Mars followed by the Amazon series, Mozart in the Jungle.

He has been nominated three times for a Primetime Emmy Award for Outstanding Cinematography for a Single-Camera Series (One Hour) for his work on Ozark in 2018 and 2020 and The White Lotus in 2025.

== Filmography ==
=== Film ===
| Year | Title | Director |
|---|---|---|
| 2002 | Bomb the System | Adam Bhala Lough |
| 2004 | The Best Thief in the World | Jacob Kornbluth |
| 2005 | Waterborne | Ben Rekhi |
| 2007 | The Fifth Patient | Amir Mann |
| 2008 | Harrison Montgomery | Daniel Davila |
| 2010 | Holy Rollers | Kevin Asch |
| 2010 | Ashes | Ajay Naidu |
| 2011 | The Art of Getting By | Gavin Wiesen |
| 2012 | Why Stop Now | Phil Dorling; Ron Nyswaner |
| 2013 | Lucky Them | Megan Griffiths |
| 2014 | Brahmin Bulls | Mahesh Pailoor |
| 2014 | Veronica Mars | Rob Thomas |
| 2014 | The Longest Week | Peter Glanz |
| 2015 | Ten Thousand Saints | Shari Springer Berman; Robert Pulcini |
| 2015 | Sleeping with Other People | Leslye Headland |
| 2017 | Crown Heights | Matt Ruskin |
| 2019 | Photograph (Note: Shared credit with Tim Gillis) | Ritesh Batra |
| 2019 | Jexi | Jon Lucas; Scott Moore |
| 2020 | Clouds | Justin Baldoni |
| 2023 | Boston Strangler | Matt Ruskin |

Documentary film

| Year | Title | Director | Notes |
|---|---|---|---|
| 2006 | Sp!t | Rotimi Rainwater | With Frank Navas |
| 2011 | Talihina Sky: The Story of Kings of Leon | Stephen C. Mitchell | With Ari Issler |
| 2011 | Dig It! | Danny Clinch | With David Homcy |
| 2015 | Soaked in Bleach | Benjamin Statler | |
| 2021 | Biggie: I Got a Story to Tell | Emmett Malloy | |

=== Television ===
| Year | Title | Director | Notes |
|---|---|---|---|
| 2007 | POV | Katie Galloway; Po Kutchins | Episode "Prison Town, USA" |
| 2019 | Legion | Dana Gonzales | Episode "Chapter 26" |
| 2021-present | The White Lotus | Mike White | Season 1 and Season 3 |
