= Murray Bartlett =

Australian actor (born 1971)

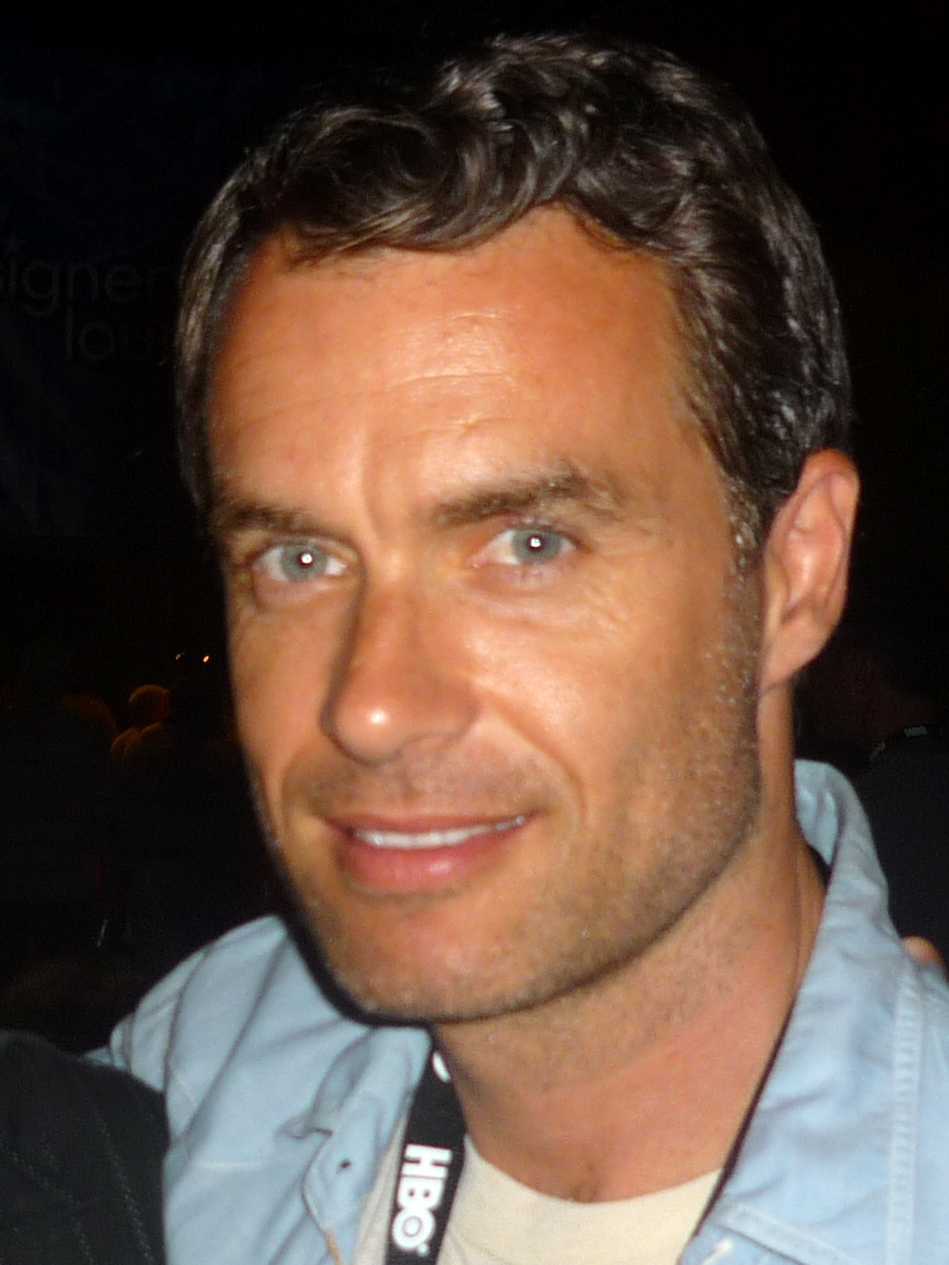
- Bartlett in 2008
- Born: March 20, 1971 (age 55); Sydney, Australia
- Education: National Institute of Dramatic Art (BFA)
- Occupation: Actor
- Years active: 1987–present

Murray Bartlett (born March 20, 1971) is an Australian actor. He became known for starring as a luxury resort manager in the first season of the HBO dark comedy series The White Lotus (2021), for which he won a Primetime Emmy Award for Outstanding Supporting Actor in a Limited or Anthology Series or Movie. He gained further recognition for his role as Nick De Noia in the Hulu miniseries Welcome to Chippendales (2022), and Frank in the episode "Long, Long Time" of the HBO drama series The Last of Us (2023), receiving Primetime Emmy Award nominations for both.

Bartlett has also appeared in the HBO comedy-drama series Looking (2014–2015), the Netflix revival series Tales of the City (2019), the Apple TV+ series Physical (2021–2023) and the second season of Hulu anthology series Nine Perfect Strangers (2025). He has a recurring role in the Apple TV series Maximum Pleasure Guaranteed (2026).

== Early life and education ==
Bartlett was born in Sydney, New South Wales, around 1971. When he was four years old, he moved with his family to Perth, Western Australia.

He attended John Curtin College of the Arts in Fremantle, where he graduated from the drama program in 1988. Upon graduating, he was admitted to the National Institute of Dramatic Art in Sydney.

== Career ==
Bartlett pursued an acting career in Australia for several years, including a role in the series headLand. In 1993, he played con man Luke Foster in Neighbours. In 2000, he relocated to the U.S. His first big break there came a few years later when he was cast as a guest star in the HBO series Sex and the City. He also played D.K., John Crichton's best friend, in four episodes of the Sci-Fi Channel series Farscape. In 2006, he joined Hugh Jackman in the Australian touring company production of Jackman's Broadway hit The Boy From Oz.

From March 2007 until the show's cancellation in September 2009, Bartlett was a cast member on the CBS daytime soap opera Guiding Light, where he played Cyrus Foley. He starred as Dominic "Dom" Basaluzzo in the HBO comedy-drama series Looking from 2014 to 2015, and then reprised his role in the series finale television film, Looking: The Movie in 2016. In 2017, he portrayed a recurring role in the musical drama series Nashville. Bartlett assumed the central role of Michael 'Mouse' Tolliver in the Netflix revival of Tales of the City.

In 2021, Bartlett starred in The White Lotus as Armond, the luxury resort manager and a recovering drug addict who has been "clean" for five years. Bartlett got the role through a self tape audition. For his portrayal, Bartlett received nominations at the Screen Actors Guild Awards and Independent Spirit Awards and won at the AACTA Awards, Critics' Choice Television Awards, and Primetime Emmy Awards.

In 2023, Bartlett appeared in the HBO post-apocalyptic drama series The Last of Us, portraying Frank in the episode "Long, Long Time". At the time of its airing, the episode received universal acclaim and was widely considered to be the best of the show's first season.

Bartlett will appear in the upcoming Netflix limited series adaptation All the Sinners Bleed, based on the S. A. Cosby novel of the same name.

== Other activities ==
Bartlett was a member of the jury panel for Adelaide Film Festival in Adelaide, South Australia, which ran from 15 to 26 October 2025.

== Personal life ==
Bartlett came out as gay early in his career. When asked about the decision in a 2021 interview, he stated, "I didn't feel like I really had an alternative. I just never felt I could ever be anything but myself." He previously lived with his partner Matt in Provincetown, Massachusetts.

== Filmography ==
=== Film ===
Year	Title	Role	Notes	Ref.
1995	Dad and Dave: On Our Selection	Sandy Tayler		
1999	Half Mongrel	Unknown role	Short film	
2001	Muffled Love	Unknown role	Short film	
2005	Postmortem	Troy	Short film	
2007	Om	John	Short film	
2010	Boys on Film 4: Protect Me from What I Want	Troy	Direct-to-video film	
2010	Needle	Tony Martin		
2011	August	Troy		
2012	Girl Most Likely	James Whitney		
2013	Kingston Avenue	Le copain de Barbara		
2015	Stubborn	Murray		
2016	Roy Spivey	Roy Spivey	Short film	
2018	Beach House	Paul		
2020	The Stand In	Terry		
2024	Ponyboi	Bruce		
2025	Opus	Stan Sullivan		
2025	O'Dessa	Plutonovich		
2026	At the Sea	Martin		
2026	The Death of Robin Hood	The Leper / Guy of Gisborne		
2026	Place to Be	Ron		

=== Television ===
Year	Title	Role	Notes	Ref.
1987	The Flying Doctors	Michael Freeman	Episode: "The Unluckiest Boy in Town"	
1992	Home and Away	Randy Evans	Recurring role; 13 episodes	
1992–1993	A Country Practice	Owen Wyatt	Episode: "Riding for a Fall: Part 2"	
1992–1993	A Country Practice	Richard Welbourne	Episodes: "Guilty Part: Parts 1 & 2"	
1993	Neighbours	Luke Foster	Recurring role; 4 episodes	
1995	The Ferals	Dr. Bob Ivory	Episode: "The Dentist"	
1996	G.P.	Unknown role	Episode: "Pendulum"	
1996	The Beast	Christopher Lane	Television film	
1997	The Tower	Jeremy	Television film	
1997	Flipper	Keith	Episode: "Help me, Rhonda"	
1999	Murder Call	Gavin Todd	Episode: "Dying Day"	
1999–2003	Farscape	Douglas 'D.K.' Knox	Recurring role; 4 episodes (seasons 1–2, 4)	
2000	Above the Law	Nathan Peters	Episode: "Happy Families"	
2000	The Three Stooges	Trocadera Patron	Television film	
2001	Flat Chat	Unknown role	Episode: "The Old Flame"	
2002	Sex and the City	Oliver Spencer	Episode: "All That Glitters"	
2002	McLeod's Daughters	Simon Birch	Recurring role; 3 episodes (seasons 1–2)	
2002	The Secret Life of Us	Nick	Recurring role; 6 episodes (season 2)	
2002	All My Children	Julian Sinclair	Series regular; 9 episodes	
2006	headLand	James Brogan	Recurring role; 5 episodes	
2006	All Saints	Roy Pickforth	Episode: "The Real Thing"	
2007	Flight of the Conchords	Mark	Episode: "Sally Returns"	
2007–2009	Guiding Light	Cyrus Foley	Series regular; 257 episodes	
2009	White Collar	Adrian Tulane	Episode: "Free Fall"	
2011	Damages	Seth Sloan	Episode: "I'd Prefer My Old Office"	
2014	The Good Wife	Logan	Episode: "The Deep Web"	
2014–2015	Looking	Dom Basaluzzo	Main role; 16 episodes	
2016	Limitless	Conrad Harris	Episode: "Hi, My Name Is Rebecca Harris"	
2016	Looking: The Movie	Dom Basaluzzo	Television film	
2016	Conviction	Victor Bonotto	Episode: "Pilot"	
2017	Nashville	Jakob Fine	Episodes: "Back in Baby's Arms" & "Ghost in This House"	
2017–2018	Iron Fist	Dr. Paul Edmonds	Recurring role; 3 episodes	
2019	Tales of the City	Michael "Mouse" Tolliver	Miniseries; 9 episodes	
2019	Madam Secretary	Australian Prime Minister Chris Lawson	Episode: "The Common Defense"	
2021	The White Lotus	Armond	Main role; 6 episodes (season 1)	
2022	Physical	Vinnie Green	Recurring role; 5 episodes (season 2)	
2022	RuPaul's Drag Race Down Under	Himself	Guest judge; Episode: "Drag Family Makeover"	
2022–2024	The Great North	Crocodile Rob / Crocodile Tom (voice)	Episodes: "A Knife to Remember Adventure" & "Welcome to Miami Adventure"	
2022–2023	Welcome to Chippendales	Nick De Noia	Miniseries; 8 episodes	
2023	The Last of Us	Frank	Episode: "Long, Long Time"	
2023	Extrapolations	Mr. Ariel Turner	Episode: "2070: Ecocide"	
2025	Nine Perfect Strangers	Brian	Main role; 8 episodes (season 2)	
2026	Maximum Pleasure Guaranteed	Dennis	Recurring role; 7 episodes	
TBA	All the Sinners Bleed †	Scott Cunningham	Limited series	

== Awards and nominations ==
Awards and nominations received by Murray Bartlett
Award	Year	Category	Nominated work	Result	Ref.
AACTA International Awards	2022	Best Actor in a Series	The White Lotus	Won	
Critics' Choice Television Awards	2022	Best Supporting Actor in a Movie/Miniseries	The White Lotus	Won	
Critics' Choice Television Awards	2023	Best Supporting Actor in a Movie/Miniseries	Welcome to Chippendales	Nominated	
Dorian Awards	2023	Best Supporting TV Performance – Drama	The Last of Us	Nominated	
Hollywood Critics Association TV Awards	2022	Best Supporting Actor in a Broadcast Network or Cable Limited or Anthology Series	The White Lotus	Won	
Hollywood Critics Association TV Awards	2023	Best Supporting Actor in a Streaming Limited or Anthology Series or Movie	Welcome to Chippendales	Nominated	
Hollywood Critics Association TV Awards	2023	Best Guest Actor in a Drama Series	The Last of Us	Nominated	
Independent Spirit Awards	2022	Best Male Performance in a New Scripted Series	The White Lotus	Nominated	
Independent Spirit Awards	2024	Best Supporting Performance in a New Scripted Series	The Last of Us	Nominated	
Primetime Emmy Awards	2022	Outstanding Supporting Actor in a Limited or Anthology Series or Movie	The White Lotus	Won	
Primetime Emmy Awards	2023	Outstanding Supporting Actor in a Limited or Anthology Series or Movie	Welcome to Chippendales	Nominated	
Primetime Emmy Awards	2023	Outstanding Guest Actor in a Drama Series	The Last of Us	Nominated	
Satellite Awards	2024	Best Supporting Actor – Series, Miniseries or Television Film	The Last of Us	Nominated	
Screen Actors Guild Awards	2022	Outstanding Performance by a Male Actor in a Miniseries or Television Movie	The White Lotus	Nominated	
