= Alexandra Daddario =

American actress (born 1986)

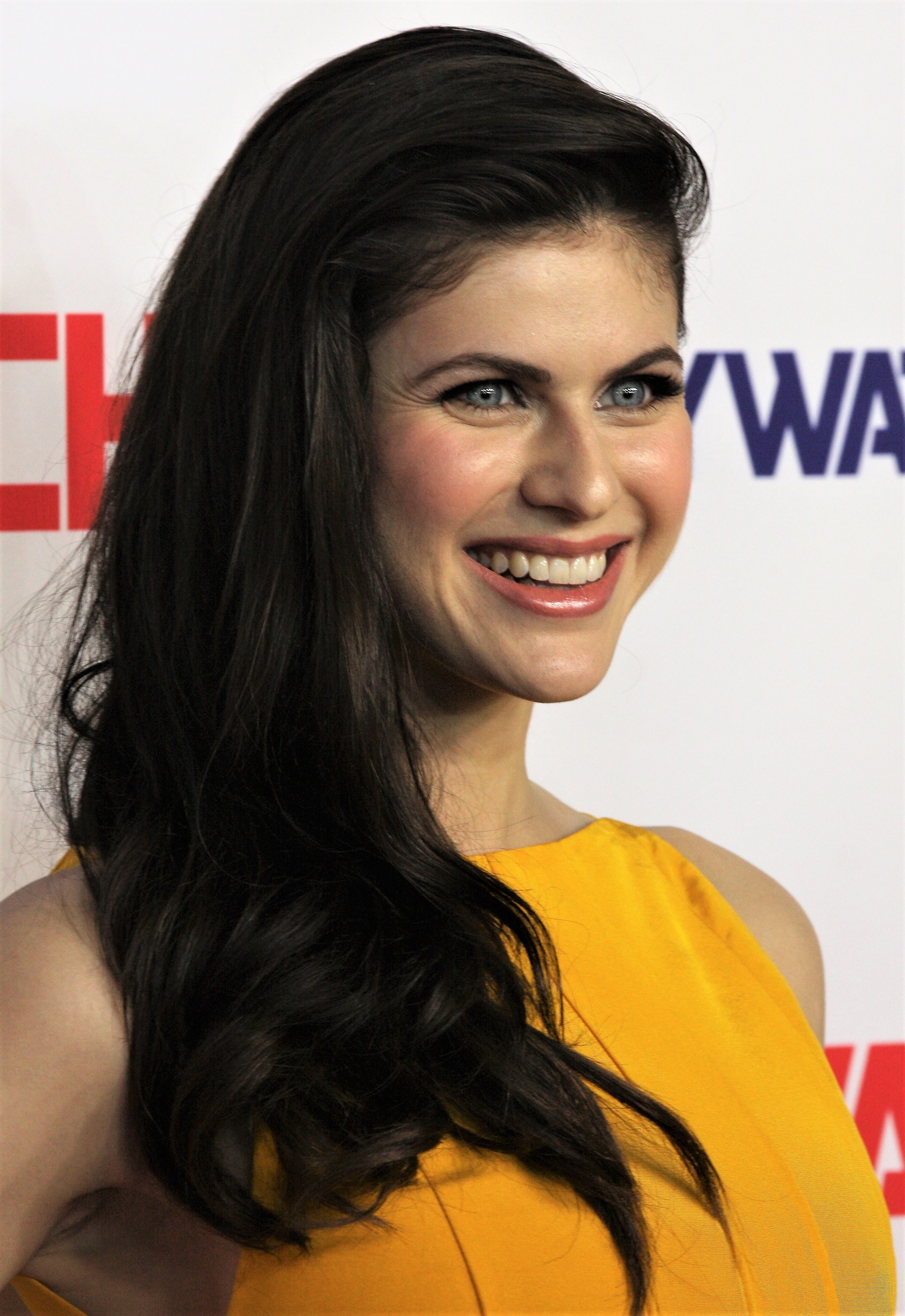
- Daddario in 2017
- Born: Alexandra Anna Daddario; March 16, 1986 (age 40); New York City, U.S.
- Occupation: Actress
- Years active: 2002–present
- Spouse: Andrew Form (m. 2022; div. 2026)
- Children: 1
- Relatives: Matthew Daddario (brother); Emilio Daddario (grandfather)

Alexandra Anna Daddario (born March 16, 1986) is an American actress. She had her breakthrough portraying Annabeth Chase in Percy Jackson & the Olympians: The Lightning Thief (2010) and its sequel (2013). She has since starred in Hall Pass (2011), Texas Chainsaw 3D (2013), San Andreas (2015), Baywatch (2017), and We Summon the Darkness (2019).

In 2021, she starred in the first season of the HBO satirical anthology series The White Lotus, for which she received critical acclaim and a nomination for the Primetime Emmy Award for Outstanding Supporting Actress in a Limited or Anthology Series or Movie. In 2023, she began playing the lead role of Dr. Rowan Fielding in the AMC horror series Mayfair Witches.

== Early life ==
Alexandra Anna Daddario was born in New York City on March 16, 1986, the eldest child of Christina, a lawyer, and Richard Daddario, a prosecutor and former head of the New York City Police Department counterterrorism unit. She is of Italian, English, Irish, and Slovak descent. She has a younger brother, Matthew Daddario, and a younger sister, Catharine, who are also both actors. Her paternal grandfather was Emilio Q. Daddario, a member of the U.S. House of Representatives for Connecticut from 1959 to 1971.

Daddario was raised on Manhattan's Upper East Side. She attended the Brearley School and the Professional Children's School. Daddario said she decided to be an actress at the age of 11. "I always loved storytelling," she said in 2019. "It was just something I genuinely wanted to do—and I could've done anything, really. I did have every opportunity on the planet." She attended Marymount Manhattan College before dropping out to pursue acting full-time. She has spent years studying the Meisner acting technique.

== Career ==
=== 2000s–2014: Early work and recognition ===
Daddario made her television debut at 15, playing victimized girl Laurie Lewis in the ABC daytime soap opera All My Children. Her first major role was as Annabeth Chase in the fantasy adventure film Percy Jackson & the Olympians: The Lightning Thief (2010). She also had a recurring role as Neal Caffrey's love interest, Kate Moreau, in the USA Network procedural drama series White Collar. In 2011, she appeared in the comedy film Hall Pass and had a recurring role as Rachel in NBC's comedy-drama series Parenthood.

In 2012, Daddario starred in the video for Imagine Dragons' song "Radioactive", which surpassed 1 billion views on YouTube. She appeared as a guest in an episode of the FX sitcom It's Always Sunny in Philadelphia. Her first starring role after Percy Jackson was as Heather Miller in the 2013 slasher film Texas Chainsaw 3D. In August 2013, Daddario reprised her role as Annabeth Chase in Percy Jackson: Sea of Monsters. She then appeared in the romantic horror comedy Burying the Ex. Burying the Ex premiered out of competition at the Venice Film Festival in 2014.

In January 2013, Daddario was cast in the first season of the HBO anthology series True Detective. She appeared in a four-episode arc as Lisa Tragnetti, a court reporter having an extramarital affair with one of the main characters.

=== 2015–2020: Breakthrough ===
Daddario played a supporting role in the 2015 blockbuster disaster film San Andreas. The same year, she made a cameo appearance in the pilot of the Fox comedy series The Last Man on Earth and a guest appearance on American Horror Story: Hotel as a fictionalized version of designer Natacha Rambova.

In 2016, Daddario had a supporting role in the Nicholas Sparks romantic drama film The Choice, directed by Ross Katz. She then starred in the 2017 film adaptation of Baywatch as Summer Quinn, who was portrayed by Nicole Eggert in the TV series. The same year, Daddario portrayed Kate Jeffries in the road trip comedy The Layover (2017), directed by William H. Macy.

In 2018, Daddario appeared in the music video "Wait" by Maroon 5 and starred as Avery Martin in the romantic comedy When We First Met, opposite the film's co-writer Adam DeVine. She made a cameo appearance as a scuba diver in Rampage, directed by Brad Peyton, but her scenes were cut from the film. Daddario starred as Constance Blackwood in We Have Always Lived in the Castle, a film adaptation of Shirley Jackson's mystery thriller novel of the same name. She also starred in the psychological thriller Night Hunter, which premiered at the LA Film Festival on September 28, 2018. Daddario portrayed Jade in the first season of the CBS All Access series Why Women Kill. In 2019, Daddario starred in and produced two films, the romantic comedy Can You Keep a Secret?, based on the novel of the same name by Sophie Kinsella, and the horror thriller We Summon the Darkness, directed by Marc Meyers.

In 2020, Daddario provided the voice of Lois Lane in the superhero animated film Superman: Man of Tomorrow and starred in the noir film Lost Girls & Love Hotels. She also appeared in Songbird, the first film shot in Los Angeles during the COVID-19 pandemic.

=== 2021–present: Focus on television ===
In 2021, she appeared in the HBO social satire anthology series The White Lotus and the film Die in a Gunfight. For her performance in the former, she received widespread critical acclaim alongside the rest of the cast, with The Hollywood Reporter writing that her performance "should redefine how audiences and casting directors see her." She was nominated for the Primetime Emmy Award for Outstanding Supporting Actress in a Limited or Anthology Series or Movie in 2022.

Daddario starred in the 2022 coming-of-age film Wildflower. Beginning in 2023, she starred in the AMC series Mayfair Witches, based on the Anne Rice novel series Lives of the Mayfair Witches. On August 28, 2025, Daddario was announced to appear in the horror film Inground and will star John Cho and Kyle Gallner.

== Personal life ==
On May 13, 2021, Daddario confirmed that she was in a relationship with producer Andrew Form. On December 2, 2021, they announced their engagement. They married in June 2022. In July 2024, Daddario announced she was pregnant after previously suffering a miscarriage. On October 31, 2024, Daddario announced the birth of her first child. In February 2026, Daddario and Form announced their separation, with Daddario filing for divorce on the day of their separation announcement.

== Filmography ==
Key
†	Denotes films that have not yet been released

=== Film ===
Year	Title	Role	Notes
2005	The Squid and the Whale	Pretty Girl	
2006	The Hottest State	Kim	
2007	The Attic	Ava Strauss	
2007	The Babysitters	Barbara Yates	
2009	Jonas Brothers: The 3D Concert Experience	Girlfriend	
2010	Percy Jackson & the Olympians: The Lightning Thief	Annabeth Chase	
2010	Bereavement	Allison Miller	
2011	Hall Pass	Paige	
2013	Percy Jackson: Sea of Monsters	Annabeth Chase	
2013	Texas Chainsaw 3D	Heather Miller / Edith Rose Sawyer	
2014	Burying the Ex	Olivia	
2015	San Andreas	Blake Gaines	
2016	Baked in Brooklyn	Kate Winston	
2016	The Choice	Monica	
2017	Baywatch	Summer Quinn	
2017	The House	Corsica	Deleted scene only
2017	The Layover	Kate Jeffries	
2018	Night Hunter	Rachel Chase	
2018	Rampage	Scuba diver	Deleted scene only
2018	We Have Always Lived in the Castle	Constance Blackwood	
2018	When We First Met	Avery Martin	
2019	Can You Keep a Secret?	Emma Corrigan	Also executive producer
2019	Lost Transmissions	Dana Lee	
2019	We Summon the Darkness	Alexis Butler	Also producer
2020	Lost Girls & Love Hotels	Margaret	Filmed in 2017
2020	1 Night in San Diego	Kelsey	
2020	Songbird	May	Direct-to-video film
2020	Superman: Man of Tomorrow	Lois Lane	Voice role; direct-to-video film
2021	Die in a Gunfight	Mary Rathcart	
2022	Wildflower	Joy	
2024	Justice League: Crisis on Infinite Earths – Part One	Lois Lane	Voice role; direct-to-video film
2024	Justice League: Crisis on Infinite Earths – Part Three	Lois Lane	Voice role; direct-to-video film
2024	I Wish You All the Best	Hannah Wallace	
2025	Couples Weekend	Debs	
2026	Hershey	Catherine "Kitty" Hershey	
TBA	Inground †	TBA	Post-production
TBA	American Fever Dream †	Carrie	Post-production; Also producer

=== Television ===
Year	Title	Role	Notes
2002–2003	All My Children	Laurie Lewis	Recurring role; 43 episodes
2004	Law & Order	Felicia	Episode: "Enemy"
2005	Law & Order: Criminal Intent	Susie Armstrong	Episode: "In the Wee Small Hours (Part 1)"
2006	Conviction	Vanessa	Episode: "Pilot"
2006	Law & Order	Samantha Beresford	Episode: "Release"
2006	The Sopranos	Another Woman	Episode: "Johnny Cakes"
2009	Damages	Lily Arsenault	Episode: "I Lied, Too"
2009	Law & Order: Criminal Intent	Lisa Wellesley	Episode: "Salome in Manhattan"
2009	Life on Mars	Emily "Rocket Girl" Wyatt	Episode: "Let All the Children Boogie"
2009	Nurse Jackie	Young Woman	Episode: "Pilot"
2009–2011	White Collar	Kate Moreau	Recurring role (seasons 1–2)
2011–2012	Parenthood	Rachel	Recurring role (season 3)
2012	It's Always Sunny in Philadelphia	Ruby Taft	Episode: "Charlie and Dee Find Love"
2014	Married	Ella the Waitress	Episode: "Pilot"
2014	New Girl	Michelle	2 episodes
2014	True Detective	Lisa Tragnetti	4 episodes
2015	American Horror Story: Hotel	Natacha Rambova	3 episodes
2015	The Last Man on Earth	Victoria	Episode: "Alive in Tucson"
2016	Robot Chicken	Theresa Johnson / Lena	Voice roles; episode: "Joel Hurwitz Returns"
2016	Workaholics	Donna	Episode: "Save the Cat"
2019	Why Women Kill	Jade / Irene Tabatchnick	Main role (season 1)
2021	The Girlfriend Experience	Tawny	Recurring role (season 3)
2021	The White Lotus	Rachel Patton	Main role (season 1)
2023–present	Mayfair Witches	Dr. Rowan Fielding (Mayfair)	Main role
2023	Koala Man	Herself	Voice role; episode: "Bin Day"
2024	Chrissy & Dave Dine Out	Herself	Episode: "Double the Fun"

=== Web ===
Year	Title	Role	Notes
2009–2010	Odd Jobs	Cassie Stetner	3 episodes
2017	Do You Want to See a Dead Body?	Herself	Episode: "A Body and a Plane"
2017	Logan Paul: Summer Saga	Herself	2 episodes
2018	After Hours with Josh Horowitz	Herself	Episode: "Ever Wanted to Date Alexandra Daddario? This Might Change Your Mind"

=== Music videos ===
Year	Title	Artist(s)	Role	Ref.
2012	"Radioactive"	Imagine Dragons	Drifter	
2017	"Judy French"	White Reaper	—N/a	
2018	"Wait"	Maroon 5	Ex-Girlfriend	
2019	"Whenever You're Around"	Bootstraps	Young Woman	

=== Video games ===
Year	Title	Role	Notes	Ref.
2015	Battlefield Hardline	Dune Alpert	Voice and motion capture	
2016	Marvel Avengers Academy	Janet van Dyne / The Wasp	Voice	

== Awards and nominations ==
Year	Award	Category	Nominated work	Result	Ref.
2010	Teen Choice Award	Choice Movie: Female Breakout Star	Percy Jackson & the Olympians: The Lightning Thief	Nominated	
2013	MTV Movie Award	Best Scared-as-S**t Performance	Texas Chainsaw 3D	Nominated	
2015	Teen Choice Award	Choice Movie Actress: Action	San Andreas	Nominated	
2017	Teen Choice Award	Choice Movie Actress: Comedy	Baywatch	Nominated	
2022	Hollywood Critics Association TV Award	Best Supporting Actress in a Broadcast Network or Cable Limited or Anthology Series	The White Lotus	Nominated	
2022	Primetime Emmy Award	Outstanding Supporting Actress in a Limited or Anthology Series or Movie	The White Lotus	Nominated	
