= Jake Lacy =

American actor (born 1986)

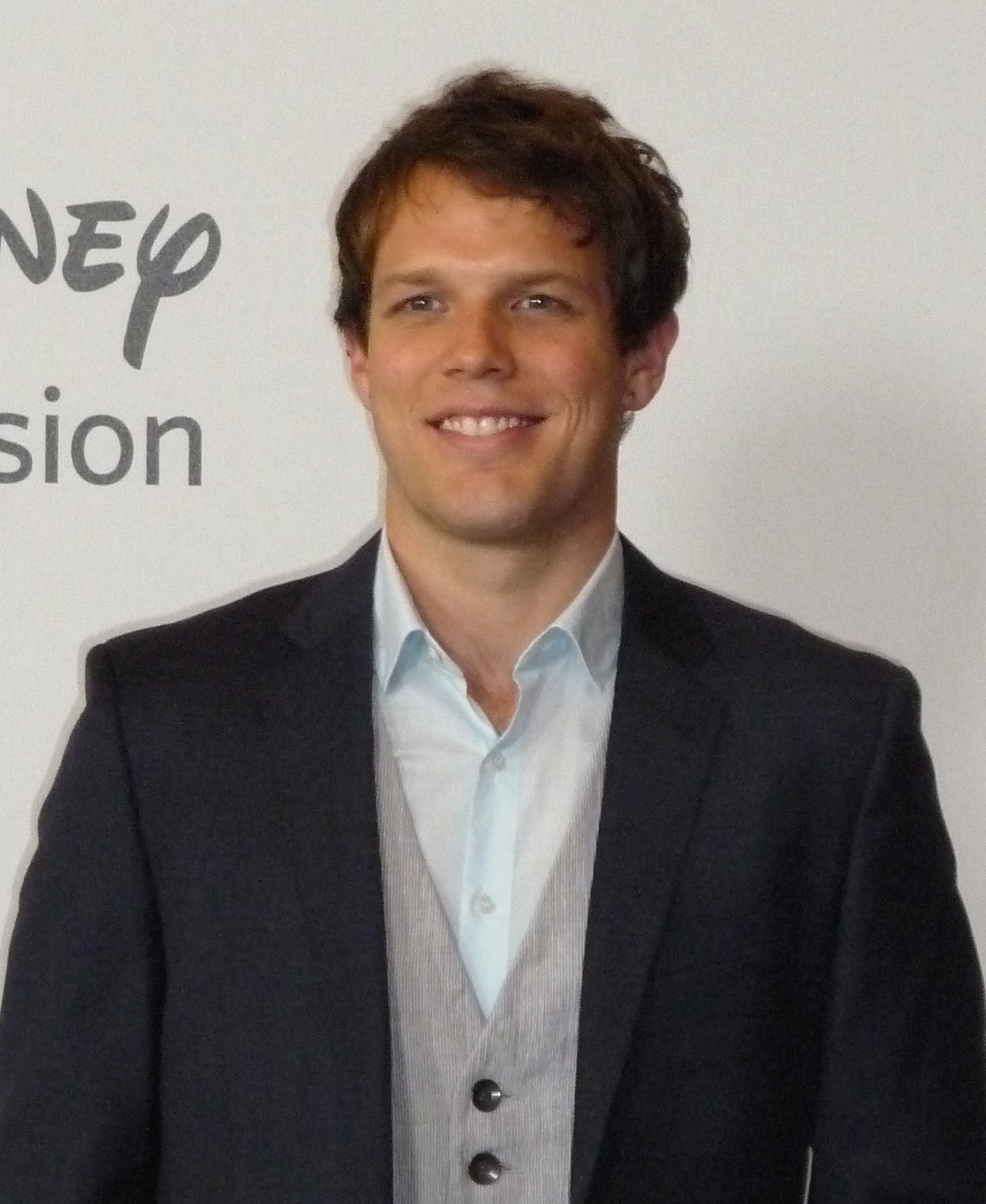
- Lacy at the 26th TCA Awards in 2010
- Born: Jameson Griffin Lacy; February 14, 1986 (age 40); Greenfield, Massachusetts, U.S.
- Education: University of North Carolina School of the Arts (BFA)
- Occupation: Actor
- Years active: 2008–present
- Spouse: Lauren Deleo (m. 2015)
- Children: 2

Jameson Griffin "Jake" Lacy (born February 14, 1986) is an American actor. He is known for his comedic and dramatic roles in both film and television. He has received nominations for an Actor Award and a Primetime Emmy Award.

Lacy had his first starring role on television in the short-lived ABC sitcom Better with You (2010–2011). He became known for his portrayal of Pete "Plop" Miller on the ninth and final season of the NBC sitcom The Office (2012–2013). He took roles in the HBO comedy-drama series Girls (2015–2016), the FX on Hulu miniseries Fosse/Verdon (2018), and the Hulu romance series High Fidelity (2020).

He took a serious role playing an entitled and wealthy real estate agent on his honeymoon in the first season of the HBO series The White Lotus (2021) earning a nomination for the Primetime Emmy Award for Outstanding Supporting Actor in a Limited or Anthology Series or Movie. He continued taking dramatic roles in a string of Peacock shows including the miniseries A Friend of the Family (2022), the mystery series Apples Never Fall (2024) and the thriller series All Her Fault (2025) as well as the Hulu crime drama series Furious (2026).

In film, made his debut in Obvious Child (2014) followed by roles in Carol (2015), Love the Coopers (2015), How to Be Single (2016), Christmas Inheritance (2017), Rampage (2018), Being the Ricardos (2021), and The Caine Mutiny Court-Martial (2023).

== Early life and education ==
Lacy was born in Greenfield, Massachusetts, to parents from Needham. He was raised in Pittsford, Vermont. His maternal grandmother was born on Molokai, Hawaii, and was of half Hawaiian descent. He attended Otter Valley Union High School, graduating in 2004.

In 2008, Lacy graduated from the University of North Carolina School of the Arts (UNCSA) in Winston-Salem. After graduation, he worked in New York state as a gym receptionist, a bar-back at a club, and a waiter while taking auditions, until he was cast as Casey in Better with You.

== Career ==
Lacy acted in high school and performed on professional stages in A Midsummer Night's Dream as Demetrius (in Hartford Stage's production), and Much Ado About Nothing as Conrad (in the Oberon Theater Ensemble's production). He had brief roles in a few episodes of Guiding Light before its cancellation. In 2010, he had a lead role in the Columbia thesis film C'est moi.

From 2010 to 2011, Lacy starred as Casey in the ABC sitcom Better with You. He starred as Pete Miller, or "Plop", in the ninth and last season of The Office. His next role was in the independent sports comedy Balls Out, as Caleb Fuller, who leads an intramural football team. In 2014, he starred in the comedy-drama film Obvious Child opposite Jenny Slate. He also appeared in the HBO comedy Girls as Fran, a love interest of Lena Dunham's protagonist Hannah. Lacy starred opposite Rooney Mara in Carol (2015), as Richard, her character's boyfriend.

In 2016, Lacy appeared in the WWII-set dramedy Their Finest, directed by Lone Scherfig, which premiered at the Toronto International Film Festival, and Miss Sloane, a political thriller directed by John Madden, which premiered at the AFI Fest. In 2017, Lacy co-starred in I'm Dying Up Here, a comedy series on Showtime. In 2019, he appeared as a love interest of Gwen Verdon, played by Michelle Williams, in Fosse/Verdon, on FX.

He played a New York police detective in the 2026 Hulu crime drama series Furious. His character Marshall Connelly was the ex-boyfriend of FBI agent Alice Black, played by Emmy Rossum.

== Personal life ==
Lacy married longtime girlfriend Lauren Deleo on August 22, 2015, in Dorset, Vermont. The couple have two sons.

== Filmography ==
Key
†	Denotes projects that have not yet been released

=== Film ===
Year	Title	Role	Notes
2014	Obvious Child	Max	Film debut
2014	Balls Out	Caleb Fuller	
2015	Carol	Richard Semco	
2015	Love the Coopers	Joe	
2016	How to Be Single	Ken	
2016	Their Finest	Carl Lundbeck / Brannigan	
2016	Miss Sloane	Forde	
2017	Christmas Inheritance	Jake Collins	
2018	Rampage	Brett Wyden	
2018	Diane	Brian	
2018	Johnny English Strikes Again	Jason Volta	
2019	Ode to Joy	Cooper	
2019	Otherhood	Paul Halston-Myers	
2021	Being the Ricardos	Bob Carroll	
2022	Significant Other	Harry	
2023	The Caine Mutiny Court-Martial	Lt. Stephen Maryk	
2025	Late Fame		
2026	A Mosquito in the Ear	Andrew	Also executive producer
2026	Magazine		
2026	Stranglehold	Tim	
TBA	Untitled Stephen Merchant film		Filming

=== Television ===
Year	Title	Role	Notes
2008	Guiding Light	Chip	Episode 15546
2010–2011	Better with You	Casey Marion Davenport	22 episodes
2012	Royal Pains	Floyd	Episode: "My Back to the Future"
2012–2013	The Office	Pete	Starring role (Season 9); 21 episodes
2014	The Michael J. Fox Show	Scott	Episode: "Surprise"
2015–2016	Billy & Billie	Keith	8 episodes
2015–2016	Girls	Fran Parker	12 episodes
2016	Last Week Tonight with John Oliver	Miscellaneous Commercial Character	Episode: "Encryption"
2017–2018	I'm Dying Up Here	Nick Beverly	16 episodes
2019	Fosse/Verdon	Ron	5 episodes
2019	Ramy	Kyle	Episode: "Refugees"
2020	High Fidelity	Clyde	Main role
2020	Mrs. America	Stanley Pottinger	2 episodes
2021	The White Lotus	Shane Patton	Main role (season 1)
2022	A Friend of the Family	Robert Berchtold	Main role
2024	Apples Never Fall	Troy Delaney	Main role
2025	All Her Fault	Peter Irvine	Main role
2026	Furious	Marshall Connelly	Main role

=== Theatre ===
Year	Title	Role	Venue	Ref.
2009	Much Ado About Nothing	Claudio	Samuel Becket Theatre, Off-Broadway	

== Awards and nominations ==
Organizations	Year	Category	Work	Result	Ref.
Actor Award	2013	Outstanding Ensemble in a Comedy Series	The Office	Nominated	
Primetime Emmy Award	2022	Outstanding Supporting Actor in a Limited Series or Movie	The White Lotus	Nominated	
Astra TV Awards	2026	Best Supporting Actor in a Limited Series or TV Movie	All Her Fault	Nominated	
