= Nobody Move (novel) =

2009 novel by Denis Johnson

- First edition cover
- Author: Denis Johnson
- Language: English
- Genre: Crime; noir
- Publisher: Farrar, Straus and Giroux
- Publication date: 2009
- Publication place: New York
- Media type: Print (hardcover)
- Pages: 196
- ISBN: 978-0-374-22290-1
- OCLC: 259266728
- Dewey Decimal: 813/.54
- LC Class: PS3560.O3745 N63 2009

Nobody Move is a crime novel by Denis Johnson published in 2009 by Farrar, Straus and Giroux. The novel first appeared as a four-part serial for Playboy magazine in 2008.

== Summary ==
Nobody Move is told from a third-person limited omniscient point-of-view and presented in four parts. The story unfolds in rural and urban settings north of Sacramento, California.

Firearms abound in the novel, among them, "a huge Colt revolver", "a Winchester Pistol-grip shotgun loaded with "00 Buck", and a ".356 Magnum" handgun. Automobiles, including late model Cadillac Broughams, a Jaguar, a 1951 Coupe de Ville and a Ford pickup also appear as plot devices.

Jimmy Luntz (referred to as Luntz by the narrator, and as Jimmy in the dialogue exchanges) is a gambling addict and an inept petty criminal. Luntz is prone to unexpected "lucky feelings", premonitions that routinely fail to materialize. When the story opens in medias res, he is employed as a singer in a no-talent Barbershop chorus.

In debt for a few thousand dollars to the gang leader Juarez, Luntz is targeted for assassination by henchman Ernest "Gambol" Gambolini. Luntz foils the hit-man, shooting and wounding him in the leg. Gambol and Juarez, both sociopaths, swear revenge. Luntz, now on the run, has a chance encounter with the strikingly beautiful Anita Desilvera, a high-functioning alcoholic and wife to the local county prosecutor, Henry "Hank" Desilvera. Hank has conspired with corrupt Judge Tanneau to embezzle $2.3 million. They have framed-up Anita for the crime. Facing six years in prison, she is determined to escape punishment and claim the money for herself. The physically unattractive Luntz and sexually piquant Anita form an uneasy alliance. One thread of the narrative follows Gambol's morphine-laced convalescence from his leg wound, under the care of a former Army nurse Mary, once the wife of Juarez. She is promised $20,000 to heal the hit-man. Gambol is obsessed with the prospect of torturing and murdering Luntz.

Luntz brings Anita to the Feather River Tavern, a hideout for his former criminal associates he knew while living in Alhambra, California. Sol Fuchs, (nicknamed "Sally Fucks') manages the establishment, seasonally popular with motorcycle gangs. He, like Luntz, is in hiding after double-crossing Juarez. John "Jay" Capra, a biker – and Sol's lover – agrees to conceal the fugitive couple for several days at the roadhouse until Anita's court date. During their sojourn at the tavern, Anita disappears for two or three days. Unbeknownst to Luntz, she murders her spouse, Hank, but not before extracting an account code from him that will allow her to access the embezzled funds.

The perfidious Sol notifies Juarez of the whereabouts of Luntz. Gambol is deployed to the tavern. Still suffering from his painful wound, Gambol botches the hit and mistakenly kills Capra. Luntz and Anita flee the scene. Juarez and his grotesque male secretary, The Tall Man (he stands 5 feet, eight inches), arrive in North California to personally liquidate Luntz. After several harrowing high-speed chases, Luntz and Anita are captured. Mary, the former Army nurse, reveals her identity as Elois Tanneau, Judge Tanneau's niece, intervening on behalf of Luntz and Antita. She and Gambol, whose love for one another has blossomed, move to Montana.

The narrative ends with the fate of Luntz and Anita unknown. The protagonists wander, perhaps in search of one another, near the banks of the Feather River.

== Critical assessment ==
Nobody Move, a crime thriller filled with "snappy, wiseacre dialogue", is one of a number of "slimmer works of fiction" that Johnson wrote after completing his chef-d'œuvre Tree of Smoke in 2007. Novelist David Means describes Nobody Move as "a short, tight crime noir...keeping the story tight to the bone, honing his sentences down to the same kind of utilitarian purity he demonstrated in Tree of Smoke." Means also observes: "One senses that Johnson took great pleasure in writing Nobody Move on a deadline" as a serial for Playboy magazine."

Journalist and novelist Steven Poole notes that "The book is dialogue-heavy, which is good, because Johnson is superb at dialogue." Critic Edwin Turner concurs: "Johnson's economy resonates from his tight plotting and structure down to his cool, concise sentences." Though likely to be considered "outside Johnson's canon", critic Turner praises Nobody Move:

There's a purity to Nobody Move, to its utter willingness to simply be what it is–and many folks won't like that; they may even accuse Johnson of slumming. Perhaps they think it's easy to write a tight, funny crime novel. Perhaps they know it's not, and they think that Johnson is being solipsistic, or even mercenary: that's unfair. Cinematic and highly visual, it recalls some of the Coen brothers' finest work...

== Theme ==
Based on the crime fiction genre, Nobody Move showcases "noir archetypes" developed and popularized in Post-war American literature and film, namely "the hard-luck loser in over his head, the femme fatale with a troubled past (and present), the sadistic thug and his moll, and the sinister mastermind." Literary critic Edwin Turner notes that Johnson "routinely explored the nature of crime—all his novels have it in one form or another…"

Author Stav Sherez registers Johnson's literary pedigree with that of "heist thriller" genre writers Elmore Leonard and George V. Higgins. Literary critic David Means locates the thematic element in Nobody Move:

All of its symbols—if you want to take a shot at finding deeper meaning—are in your face and seem to be saying that for the most part, most of us live within the status quo, one way or another, just trying to locate the next move…Johnson's feat here is to present all of this in a manner that's simultaneously invigorating to the genre but also a confirmation of its pleasures.

Means adds: "Johnson is one of the last of the hard-core American realist writers, working—in his own way—along a line that might be charted from Melville and Stephen Crane, with a detour through Flannery O'Connor and Don DeLillo..."

== Sources ==
- Lennon, J. Robert (May 9, 2018). "The Intersection of Souls". The Nation.
- Means, David (May 7, 2009). "The Way of the Gun". The New York Times.
- Poole, Steven (June 19, 2009). "A bigger bang". The Guardian.
- Sherez, Stav (November 13, 2014). "Fear and Loathing in Freetown". Los Angeles Review of Books.
- Turner, Edwin (April 17, 2010). "Denis Johnson's Nobody Move and the Pleasures of Postmodern Crime Fiction". Biblioklept.
