= Stars at Noon =

Stars at Noon may refer to:

- Stars at Noon (1959 film), French film
- Stars at Noon (2022 film), directed by Claire Denis based on the novel
- The Stars at Noon, 1986 novel by Denis Johnson
