= The Name of the World =

2000 novel by Denis Johnson

- First edition cover
- Author: Denis Johnson
- Language: English
- Publisher: HarperCollins
- Publication date: 2000
- Publication place: United States
- Media type: Print (hardcover)
- Pages: 129
- ISBN: 978-0-06-019248-8
- OCLC: 43227331
- Dewey Decimal: 813/.54
- LC Class: PS3560.O3745 N36 2000

The Name of the World is a novel by Denis Johnson published in 2000 by HarperCollins.

== Plot ==
The Name of the World is told from a first-person point-of-view by its narrator, Michael Reed. Reed is a 50-year-old adjunct professor at a Midwestern university. He suffers from a crippling sense of loss and guilt due to the deaths of his wife and 5-year-old daughter in an automobile accident. As the years pass, to his dismay, he finds that he can recall their faces only with great difficulty. Reed's oppressive grief becomes a chronic obsession.

Reed makes several attempts to break out of his mundane existence in academia—with little success—until he meets the 26-year-old student performance artist and amateur stripper, Flower Cannon. Her indulgence in New-Age jargon and alien-abduction narratives fascinates Reed, and he begins to follow Flower to various venues: a casino, where he is punched in the face by a co-gambler; a Young Goodman Brown-like Mennonite religious service where he denounces God; and finally, an assignation at Flower's studio. Though they do not engage in sexual intimacy, the encounter serves as an epiphany for Reed, providing him with an avenue to escape from his obsessive necrophilia—and towards an affirmation of life. The story closes with Reed serving as a journalist near Iraq during Operation Desert Storm.

== Critical assessment ==
The Name of the World, at 129 pages, is more a novella or "a long short story" than a novel with respect to its dramatic scope, according to William H. Cobb of the Houston Chronicle. As such, the work is reminiscent of Johnson's short fiction in Jesus's Son. Jean Charnneau of The Denver Post also notes the brevity of the novel, but with this caveat:

The Name of the World is brief and subdued. That's not to say it's a lightweight—far from it...It's a powerful, sometimes puzzling, multilayered novel, the type that gains tremendously from being read twice."

Robert Stone in The New York Times praised Johnson's poetry infused prose: "The world rushing by is sometimes imperfectly realized, sometimes bleak, occasionally luminous. Still, there's no doubt about the power of this writer's vision." Clay Smith of the Austin Chronicle concurs: "The Name of the World is poetry that happens to be packaged as prose..." Michael Miller of The Village Voice emphasizes the Johnson's literary merits, rather than the narrative structure of The Name of the World:

It's a happy, somewhat tacked-on ending. But if Name's conclusion doesn't quite hold together, this doesn't diminish Johnson's brilliance as a writer—or his point that mourning can become a dull habit, that understanding it too well might only deepen the rut. Grief, The Name of the World powerfully suggests, is a messy thing, requiring a messy exit.

== Themes ==
The Name of the World is an examination of grief and its broader human implications. As narrative, grief is limited to the protagonist Michael Reed, but Johnson's handling of the theme has universal resonance. Literary critic Clay Smith writes:

The Name of the World is grief told anew, as if we hadn't really known anything about it before. Johnson's typical clarity is in powerful focus here. It's a minute and sometimes wrenching focus that somehow seems to encompass the entire world. Smith emphasizes this point: "...the crucial elements of the novel, like where and when it takes place, begin to matter less and less as the story progresses..."

Protagonist Michael Reed—"a relatively solid citizen"—is not among the "misfits, drug-addicts and forgotten portrayed in Johnson's Jesus's Son or Angels."

According to critic Jean Charbonneau, the characters that inhabit the Reed's professional milieu are nonetheless "psychologically impaired and are searching for themselves, [among them] uninterested professors, self-absorbed writers, well-off individuals who can't find happiness in their comfortable existence." Reed's "quiet desperation" manifests itself in a form of "dependency" according to critic Michael Miller, "Johnson here portrays a different sort of addiction, not so much to lost loved ones as to going through the motions of grief." Critic William H. Cobb rejects any thematic identification of Reed's interest in Flower Cannon as a "May–December" romance:

The narrative leads the reader to think the novel may be another obsessive-love story between student and professor, à la Francine Prose's latest, Blue Angel, but that's where Johnson pulls a surprise. Flower Cannon does reappear several times, and does hold a significant key to the outcome of the story, but it's not what you think. The Name of the World is not a love story as such, certainly not the tragic tale of an oldish professor lusting after a young student.

== Sources ==
- Charbonneau, Jean (July 16, 2000). "Prof's angst-ridden world full of surprises". The Denver Post.
- Cobb, William J. (October 1, 2000). "'The Name of the World' by Denis Johnson". Houston Chronicle.
- Miller, Michael (July 25, 2000). "Anatomy of Melancholy". The Village Voice. Archived from the original on September 16, 2018.
- Smith, Clay (July 7, 2000). "Defining the Name of the World". The Austin Chronicle.
- Stone, Robert (July 9, 2000). "In Transit". The New York Times.
