= The Stars at Noon =

1986 novel by Denis Johnson

- First edition cover
- Author: Denis Johnson
- Language: English
- Set in: Nicaragua in 1984
- Publisher: Alfred A. Knopf
- Publication date: September 18, 1986
- Publication place: United States
- Media type: Print (hardcover and paperback)
- Pages: 181
- ISBN: 978-0-394-53840-2 (hardcover)
- Dewey Decimal: 813/.54
- LC Class: PS3560.O3745 S7 1986

The Stars at Noon is a 1986 novel by Denis Johnson. It was published by Alfred A. Knopf on September 12, 1986. The novel follows an unnamed American woman during the Nicaraguan Revolution in 1984. It was adapted into the 2022 film Stars at Noon, starring Margaret Qualley and Joe Alwyn.

== Plot ==
The novel follows an unnamed American woman, supposedly a journalist, living in Managua, Nicaragua in 1984, during Sandinista rule. She originally traveled to Nicaragua as an observer for an anti-war group. She is disgusted with the corruption of both the Sandinistas and "the stupid CIA." She hustles as a prostitute at the Inter-Continental Hotel in Managua, hoping to leave Nicaragua one day. At the hotel, she eventually meets an unnamed English oil businessman with whom she falls in love. When the Englishman has a falling out with the Nicaraguans, the two flee together towards the southern border with Costa Rica. An American who is most likely a CIA agent tracks them and pressures her to sell out the Englishman.

== Background ==
Denis Johnson visited Nicaragua and Costa Rica two years prior to the novel's publication. He initially planned to write a magazine article, but the prospect of his words being judged seriously in nonfiction turned him off. He instead turned to fiction, using the Central American atmosphere as both the novel's setting and as a spiritual allegory for hell. The novel's female narrator and other characters remain mostly nameless. In a telephone interview with Jane Perlez of The New York Times, Johnson explained: "I thought it was appropriate that the people in hell wouldn't have any names. She refers to a couple of people with names, then withdraws them." Johnson also said he did not feel uncomfortable writing in a woman's voice because he had previous experience from completing a number of dramatic monologues in the female voice.

== Reception ==
Publishers Weekly gave the novel a mixed review, writing, "Short as it is, the book could be trimmed by half without loss of substance. Johnson's previous novels Angels and Fiskadoro displayed an unmistakable gift. Unfortunately, this is inferior work by a manifestly superior writer." Kirkus Reviews also gave the novel a mixed review, saying it would have been better as a non-fiction book but concluded, "Johnson delivers an evocative and potently depressing travelogue, and does so with more savvy and unromantic political velleity than is found in books by, say, Graham Greene or Joan Didion." Caryn James of The New York Times Book Review gave the novel a mixed review, writing, "language slides off its moorings, as style mirrors substance almost too well. Just as often as it is debased, the language is inflated by the empty abstractions of the narrator."

People gave the novel a positive review, calling Johnson "an original, exciting writer, worth every minute spent in his nightmarish creation."

John Blades of the Chicago Tribune called the novel "intensely mystical and poetic; it has the texture and illogic of a nightmare."

== Legacy and influence ==
Writing for The Guardian in 2012, Scottish novelist Alan Warner cited The Stars at Noon as evidence that Johnson is "one of America's greatest fiction writers." Writing for The Daily Beast in 2017, Jeremy Kryt called the novel "excellent" and compared its "shiftless gringo's point of view" to that of Oliver Stone's film Salvador (1986), writing, "Yet one could argue that Johnson's lost and nameless heroine is the more sympathetic character—and a more tragic figure—than Stone's protagonist."

The novel inspired "The Sprawl" by Sonic Youth, a song from the band's fifth studio album Daydream Nation (1989). The lyrics for the song's first verse were taken directly from The Stars at Noon by the band's vocalist and guitarist Kim Gordon.

== Film adaptation ==
The novel was adapted by Claire Denis, Léa Mysius and Andrew Litvack into the 2022 film Stars at Noon. The film was directed by Claire Denis and stars Joe Alwyn and Margaret Qualley. Claire Denis read Johnson's novel a decade earlier and assessed it as a love story between two people who develop a relationship solely due to the context of the revolution. She added, "It's also about the fear and the terror of love, the fear of failure." Whereas the novel is set in 1984 during the Nicaraguan Revolution, the film is set in present-day Nicaragua during the COVID-19 pandemic.
