= The Incognito Lounge and Other Poems =

Collection of poetry by Denis Johnson

- First edition cover
- Author: Denis Johnson
- Language: English
- Genre: Poetry
- Publisher: Random House
- Publication date: 1982
- Publication place: United States
- Media type: Print (hardcover)
- Pages: 79
- ISBN: 978-0-394-52347-7
- OCLC: 8110339
- Dewey Decimal: 811/.54
- LC Class: PS3560.O3745 I47 1982

The Incognito Lounge and Other Poems is a collection of lyric poetry by Denis Johnson. Published in 1982 by Random House, the volume was Johnson's third book of poems.

The volume was selected by Mark Strand for the National Poetry Series in 1982.

== Poems ==
- "The Incognito Lounge"
- "White, White Collars"
- "Enough"
- "Night"
- "Heat"
- "The Boarding"
- "The Song"
- "The White Fires of Venus"
- "Nude"
- "Vespers"
- "The Story"
- "Surreptitious Kissing"
- "From A Berkeley Notebook"
- "On the Olympia"
- "A Woman"
- "Now"
- "Ten Month After Turning Thirty"
- "In a Light of Other Lives"
- "For Jane"
- "The Circle"
- "Sway"
- "The Woman in the Moon"
- "The Flames"
- "Minutes"
- "The Coming of Age"
- "You"
- "Poem"
- "Radio"
- "Tomorrow"
- "Confession of St. Jim-Ralph"
- "Passengers"

== Critical appraisal ==
John Casteen, writing in Voltage Poetry ranks The Incognito Lounge and Other Poems as one of Johnson's two literary "masterpieces", the other his short fiction volume Jesus' Son (1992). Nicholo Niarchos in The New Yorker, while acknowledging Johnson's fine prose, considers it "a shame that the author is not more known for his verse":

Johnson's magisterial Jesus' Son, is a series of vignettes about drug addiction and the white working class from a time before they were referred to as such. Few of the plaudits, however, mentioned his poetry. This is not that surprising; it's much less fervid than his prose. Johnson's poetry works in quietly wrought, variously personal ways, emanating from what he might call 'the terror / of being just one person—one chance, one set of days.'"

Alan Williamson of The New York Times writes: "Johnson convinces me that he suffers over the anomie he describes. He is hard on himself, as well as on the culture; and he is agonizingly aware that life can be, and has been, different from the life around him." Williamson praises "Passengers", one of the sonnets in the volume. Poet Ray Deshpande of the Poetry Foundation notes that while Johnson was "adept across genres, writing plays and searing war reportage in addition to fiction, one finds a distinctive voice in his four short books of poems." Among the poets influenced by Johnson are Bianca Stone, Matt Hart, and Lucie Brock-Broido. Deshpande quotes poet Jorie Graham: "Lord knows, I couldn't have written without Denis Johnson's The Incognito Lounge..."

Poet Richard Miklitsch writing in The Iowa Review considers the title poem "The Incognito Lounge" the "premiere" work in the volume, one that "twists tradition in such a way as to seem wholly independent of it." Miklitsch adds: "Johnson's imagination seems particularly suited to this kind of poem, one composed of seemingly self-contained anecdotes that, put together, produced a skewed but strangely satisfying story." Miklitsch regards a number of the poems in the collection as technically "unfinished", in particular "From a Berkeley Notebook":

...not all of The Incognito Lounge and Other Poems is as fine as the title poem. Johnson seems to be one of those poets who has to be struck by lightning to write…which may account for the uneven and sometimes disturbingly unfinished quality of his work.

Among those poems in the volume that succeed in making "the ordinary extraordinary" Miklitsch cites "Heat", "Enough", "At the Olympic Peninsula", "Ten Months After Turning Thirty" and "The Flames." In the verse that forms "The Circus" Miklitsch locates Johnson's "poetic personality":

…Johnson's work would be nothing without his sympathetic imagination...the speaker's involvement in the commonplace grief of other people, all the waitresses and bus drivers, drunks and refugees and school truants who people Hopper's paintings...illuminates the prosaic world in which men and women go doggedly about their dark lives of desperation.

== Sources ==
- Casteen, John (April 2, 2013). "John Casteen on Denis Johnson's "The Incognito Lounge"". Voltage Poetry.
- Deshpande, Jay (August 7, 2017). "My Denis Johnson". Poetry Foundation.
- Helm, Michael (June 2, 2017) [Winter 2009]. "The Review: The Incognito Lounge and The Veil by Denis Johnson". Brick. No. 82.
- Miklitsch, Michael (1983). "Review of "The Incognito Lounge and Other Poems"by Robert Miklitsch". The Iowa Review. Vol. 13, no. 3–4. pp. 246–250. doi:10.17077/0021-065X.2969.
- Niarchos, Nicolas (June 4, 2018). ""The Throne of the Third Heaven of the Nations Millennium General Assembly," by Denis Johnson". The New Yorker.
- Williamson, Alan (October 10, 1982). "Three Poets". The New York Times.
