= Car Crash While Hitchhiking =

Short story by Denis Johnson

- Short story by Denis Johnson
- Language: English

Publication
- Published in: The Paris Review
- Publication date: Spring 1989

"Car Crash While Hitchhiking" is a short story by the American writer Denis Johnson based on a real incident in Johnson's life. The story was first published in the Spring 1989 issue of The Paris Review and collected in The Best American Short Stories 1990, which was curated by Richard Ford. It served as the opening story in Johnson's 1992 short story collection Jesus' Son.

== Plot ==
In this story, a drug-addicted narrator recounts hitchhiking in four different vehicles, first with a Cherokee, then a salesperson, then a college student, and finally a family composed of a husband, wife, young daughter and a baby. The salesperson is drunk and shares alcohol and pills with the narrator before leaving him off to find a student who drives him until he catches a ride with the family. Eventually, this vehicle is struck by another car resulting in the death of the driver of the other car. The story ends with the narrator looking back several years later, seemingly in detox, as he recounts his drug abuse, which the entire narration of the story reflects in a style of disconnect from reality.

== Critical assessment ==
"Car Crash While Hitchhiking" opens Johnson's 1992 short fiction collection Jesus' Son. According to critic J. Robert Lennon, the story is perhaps "the volume's most arresting work" and exhibits "sudden swerves in diction, from the straightforward and unadorned to the wildly metaphorical and self-conscious." He adds:

At the heart of this little piece is the voice of a lone man, swinging on the down-curve of drugs, who hitchhikes into an auto accident. The narrative spins and swerves, but despite all these different tacks we still know this man -- his passivity, his sensory imprisonment, his essential decency and his aspiration toward holiness."

Author David L. Ulin considers "Car Crash While Hitchhiking" the "most vivid short story that I know."

Representative of the "multiple interlocking stories" that comprise the collection of short fiction in Jesus' Son, the title story deals almost exclusively with the "phantasmagorical" experiences of the drug-addicted. Critic Troy Jollimore calls "Car Crash While Hitchhiking" a classic of the American short story form."

Johnson studied writing at the Iowa Writers' Workshop in the 1970s under the mentorship of author Raymond Carver. Critic Sandy English observes that "Carver is clearly an influence on Johnson's work." Johnson's mastery of the short story form is on display in "Car-Crash While Hitchhiking", a tale that takes the reader into the world of the protagonist's "drug-fueled insanity." Author Jeffrey Eugenides writes:

... In a little over a thousand words —Johnson found a way to leave out the maximum in terms of plot, setting characterization, and authorial explanation while finding a voice that suggested all these things, a voice whose brokenness is the reason behind the narrative deprivation, and therefore a kind of explanation itself.

== Sources ==
- English, Sandy (January 15, 2019). "The Largesse of the Sea Maiden—Short stories by American author Denis Johnson". World Socialist Web Site.
- Eugenides, Jeffrey (December 26, 2016). "Denis Johnson's Perfect Short Story". The Paris Review.
- Geltner, Ted (October 2022). "The Terrifying Car Crash That Inspired a Masterpiece". The New Yoker. New York: Condé Nast.
- Jollimore, Troy (January 11, 2018). "Denis Johnson's legacy of grace evident in new, posthumous story collection". Chicago Tribune.
- Lennon, J. Robert (May 9, 2018). "The Intersection of Souls". The Nation.
- Simpson, Mona (February 24, 1991). "God and Man in Provincetown". The New York Times.
- Ulin, David L. (Spring 2018). "Seeker: Denis Johnson and the Literature of Last Things". Virginia Quarterly Review. Vol. 94, no. 1. Illustrated by Patrick Bremer. Archived from the original on March 5, 2018.
