= Resuscitation of a Hanged Man =

1991 novel by Denis Johnson

- First edition cover
- Author: Denis Johnson
- Language: English
- Publisher: Farrar, Straus and Giroux
- Publication date: March 5, 1991
- Publication place: United States
- Media type: Print (hardcover)
- Pages: 256
- ISBN: 978-0-374-24949-6
- OCLC: 22309628
- Dewey Decimal: 813/.54
- LC Class: PS3560.O3745 R47 1990

Resuscitation of a Hanged Man is a novel by Denis Johnson published in 1991 by Farrar, Straus and Giroux.

The story explores the struggles of a private investigator, Leonard English, to become a person of religious faith, and his isolated descent into madness.

== Plot ==
Leonard English, a man deeply troubled by a suicide attempt and existential despair, relocates to Provincetown, Massachusetts, in search of a new beginning. He secures employment as a private detective and part-time disc jockey. English is quickly absorbed into the investigation of a missing person, which serves as the central plot of the novel. This case leads him into the heart of Provincetown's eclectic community, where he encounters a diverse cast of characters, each with their own stories and secrets. It's a place marked by its vivid array of figures — from artists and fishermen to drag queens and religious zealots

As English delves deeper into the investigation, his personal quest for meaning and redemption becomes intertwined with the lives of the townspeople. He forms a complex relationship with a radical and enigmatic woman, which challenges his beliefs and forces him to confront his own identity and desires. The mystery of the missing person unfolds against the backdrop of Provincetown's vibrant and sometimes sordid life, exposing English to the town's varied facets—from its art scene to its underbelly.

The plot thickens as English uncovers layers of deceit, leading him to question not just the nature of the case he is investigating but also the very fabric of reality and his place within it. The novel climaxes with revelations that shake the foundations of English's world, forcing him to reassess his pursuit of truth and the possibility of finding redemption. Denis Johnson's narrative intertwines the external mystery with English's internal struggle, culminating in a resolution that leaves as many questions as it answers, reflective of the complexities of life and the search for meaning.

== Critical assessment ==
In her review for The New York Times, novelist Mona Simpson, testifying to Johnson's "ability to write a gorgeous sentence", registers this critique of Resuscitation of a Hanged Man:

Denis Johnson is an artist. He writes with a natural authority, and there is real music in his prose. Yet in this book he has not found a subject to match the scale of his talent and intelligence. Nor has he found a steady vantage point from which to view that subject.

== Theme ==
Critic David L. Ulin argues that the thematic center of The Resuscitation of a Hanged Man—"the key to the entire novel"—resides in the protagonist Leonard English's inability to distinguish his "brief, intense flashes of the starkest lucency" from his bouts of dementia. The protagonist laments that "our delusions are just as likely to be real as our most careful scientific observations."

"The nature of Johnson's own [religious] beliefs seems to have been inexpressible. Late in life, he'd given up trying to explain: 'If I've discussed these things in the past, I shouldn't have', he said in 2013. 'I'm not qualified. I don't know who God is, or any of that. People concerned with those questions turn up in my stories, but I can't explain why they do. Sometimes I wish they wouldn't.'"—Novelist and critic Aaron Thier in Denis Johnson's God, The Point (2017)

Johnson renders striking descriptions of the real world from which English crafts his delusions which serve to illustrate his character's descent into madness. Ulin offers this caveat:

As English continues his descent, though, it is this quality of open-endedness that [...] becomes Resuscitation of a Hanged Man's one real weakness. For when he begins to focus on the conspiracy he thinks he sees everywhere, English's sense of possibility narrows, although the book's does not. The result is a murkiness that affects the final 100 pages, rendering English's thoughts and motivations increasingly unclear.

Mona Simpson notes that "Roman Catholicism is a persistent theme in Mr. Johnson's work...evincing a deep attraction to the lavish emblems and ritual of the Mass."

Johnson "flirts" with the detective genre in this novel—Simpson compares English with the investigator Jake Gittes in Chinatown (1974)—however, the thematic element in The Resuscitation of a Hanged Man is "God", according to critic Aaron Thier: "God the metaphor, God the stylistic trope, God the real and eternal being..."

Simpson comments on Johnson's development of his subsidiary characters in a novel in which the protagonist searches for his "doppelgänger":

Almost every character in Resuscitation of a Hanged Man is an extreme type, yet the book doesn't have the exuberant choreographic energy that is necessary to pull off this sort of masked pageant. Denis Johnson wants to write about one man's wrestle with the voice of God. Ultimately, the other characters are merely gorgeously written figures in the landscape behind him.

== Sources ==
- Johnson, Denis (1991). Resuscitation of a Hanged Man. New York: Farrar, Straus & Giroux. ISBN 978-0-374-24949-6.
- McManus, James (December 27, 1992). "The Road to Detox". The New York Times.
- Miller, Michael (July 25, 2000). "Anatomy of Melancholy". The Village Voice. Archived from the original on September 16, 2018.
- Simpson, Mona (February 24, 1991). "God and Man in Provincetown". The New York Times.
- Sherez, Stav (November 13, 2014). "Fear and Loathing in Freetown". Los Angeles Review of Books.
- Thier, Aaron (2018). "Denis Johnson's God". The Point. No. 17. Criticism.
- Ulin, David L. (April 28, 1991). "The Architecture of Madness". The Washington Post.
