= Nobody Move =

Nobody Move may refer to:

- Nobody Move (album), a 1983 album by Yellowman
- Nobody Move (novel), a 2009 crime novel by Denis Johnson
