= Already Dead =

Already Dead may also refer to:

- Already Dead (Huston novel), a 2005 pulp-noir / horror novel by Charlie Huston
- Already Dead: A California Gothic, a 1997 novel by Denis Johnson
- Already Dead (film), a 2008 film drama
- "Already Dead" (song), a song by Juice Wrld from the album Fighting Demons, a soundtrack for the documentary Juice Wrld: Into the Abyss
- "Already Dead", a song by the band Silverstein from the album Discovering the Waterfront
- "Already Dead", a song by Ronnie Radke from the mixtape Watch Me
- Already Dead, a 2021 album by Willy Mason
