= Train Dreams =

2011 novella by Denis Johnson

- First edition cover
- Author: Denis Johnson
- Audio read by: Will Patton
- Cover artist: Thomas Hart Benton
- Language: English
- Genre: Historical fiction
- Set in: Idaho and Washington
- Publisher: Farrar, Straus and Giroux
- Publication date: August 30, 2011
- Publication place: New York
- Media type: Print (hardcover and paperback)
- Pages: 116
- Awards: O. Henry Award (2003); Aga Khan Prize for Fiction (2002)
- ISBN: 978-0-374-28114-4
- OCLC: 705350825
- Dewey Decimal: 813/.54
- LC Class: PS3560.O3745 T73 2011

Train Dreams is a novella by Denis Johnson. It was published on August 30, 2011, by Farrar, Straus and Giroux. It was originally published, in slightly different form, in the Summer 2002 issue of The Paris Review.

The novella details the life of Robert Grainier, an American railroad laborer, who lives the life of a hermit until he marries and has a daughter, only to lose both wife and child in a forest fire, and sink into isolation again.

The novella won an O. Henry Award in 2003. It also won the 2002 Aga Khan Prize for Fiction. It was a finalist for the 2012 Pulitzer Prize for Fiction, but no award was given that year. A film adaptation of the same name was released on Netflix in 2025.

== Plot ==
In summer 1917, a Chinese laborer is accused of stealing from the company stores of the Spokane International Railway in the Idaho Panhandle. Robert Grainier and the other white laborers attempt to throw him over the bridge they are constructing, but he escapes. Grainier stops in Meadow Creek and buys a bottle of sarsaparilla for his wife, Gladys, and their four-month-old daughter, Kate. Hiking home to his cabin, Grainier thinks he sees the Chinese man and believes he has cursed him.

In 1893, a seven-year-old Grainier was put on an orphan train, and was adopted by a family in Fry, Idaho. He witnesses the mass deportation of Chinese families from their town. In 1899, the towns of Fry and Eatonville merged to form Bonners Ferry. Grainier quit school in his early teens and had various jobs with the railroad and local families through his twenties. At age 31, he marries Gladys Olding.

In 1920, Grainier leaves for northwestern Washington to help repair the Robinson Gorge Bridge. That summer, Grainier returns to Idaho to find that a massive wildfire had consumed the valley. His cabin is lost, and his wife and daughter are nowhere to be found. The following spring, he returns to their cabin and believes he feels Gladys' spirit. One night, he sees her white bonnet "sailing past" above him. He lives there through summer, taking in a red dog as company. He hikes to Meadow Creek and takes a train to Bonners Ferry, staying there through winter. In March, he returns to the Moyea Valley and rebuilds his cabin. After four years, Grainier realizes he cannot continue to move out every summer to Washington and every winter to Bonners Ferry. By April 1925, he stays and works in town.

Around this time, Grainier hears rumors about a wolf-girl. Grainier is visited by a figure of his wife Gladys, who tells him she died after falling and breaking her back on rocks down by the river. Before drowning, she unknotted her bodice to allow Kate to crawl away and escape.

Thereafter, Grainier lives in his cabin, working one final summer in the Washington woods to pay for winter lodging for his horses. Grainier continues to live in his cabin, despite having arthritis and rheumatism. When a pack of wolves comes upon his cabin one night, Grainier sees a wolf-girl and is convinced it is his daughter, Kate. She growls and barks at him, but lets him splint her broken leg. She sleeps in his cabin but leaps out the window come morning. He never sees her again.

Robert Grainier dies in his sleep in November 1968. His body is discovered next spring by a pair of hikers. In a memory from 1935, Grainier attends a sideshow to see a "wolf-boy". The audience laugh at him but fall silent as the boy unleashes a terrifying, primordial roar that fills the room, after which everything goes dark and the moment is gone forever.

== Publication ==
Train Dreams was published by Farrar, Straus and Giroux on August 30, 2011. It was originally published, in slightly different form, in the Summer 2002 issue of The Paris Review.

The novella appeared at number 28 on The New York Times Hardcover Fiction best-sellers list on October 9, 2011.

== Reception ==
Publishers Weekly called the novella "the synthesis of Johnson's epic sensibilities rendered in miniature in the clipped tone of Jesus' Son."

Writing for The New York Times Book Review, author Anthony Doerr praised the novella, writing, "What Johnson builds from the ashes of Grainier's life is a tender, lonesome and riveting story, an American epic writ small."

Alan Warner, in The Guardian said that it was a book with a "tragic and surreal" denouement and that "Softly and beautifully, this novel asks a profound question of human life: is the cost of human society and so-called civilisation perhaps just too high?" K. Reed Petty, for Electric Literature, said "Train Dreams, luscious with grief, regret, and lowered expectations, is a lesson in end-of-the-frontier humility for a country anticipating apocalypse." In Ploughshares, Jocelyn Lieu said that the novel was "a brilliantly imagined elegy to the lost wilderness of the early 20th-century Idaho Panhandle".

James Wood in The New Yorker rated Train Dreams "a severely lovely tale" and Eileen Battersby of The Irish Times declares that "Johnson's novella, Train Dreams, a daring lament to the American West, is a masterpiece which should have won him the Pulitzer Prize but was short-listed in a year that the jury decided not to award it."

== Critical assessment ==
=== Style ===
Critics have widely discerned the influence of 20th Century American novelists in Train Dreams, most strikingly that of Ernest Hemingway, and in particular Johnson's use of the declarative sentence, a hallmark of Hemingway's style.

Literary critic Anthony Wallace praises Johnson's sustained and skillful use of this stylistic device: "Johnson is indeed a very good Hemingway disciple, perhaps even a great one…the true, simple declarative sentence is alive and well here..." Wallace points out that Johnson's use of "free indirect discourse" serves to convey the simple and unaffected quality of his protagonist: "[M]ost of what we know about Grainier on the inside is achieved indirectly, suggestively" in the manner of Hemingway.

Critic James Wood praises Johnson's Hemingwayesque writing: "Johnson often uses an unobtrusive, free indirect style to inhabit the limited horizons of his characters", adding this caveat:

There is a kind of pure, clean American simplicity in prose that is easy to mimic and hard to make. Sometimes, after the beautiful monotonies of Hemingway, one longs to bathe in impurities—to take on the luxuries and rough excesses of a more abundant style. Spareness can be too spare, and a reticent avoidance of sentimentality can itself prove sentimental. Train Dreams...seems at times a bit too close to this tradition, as if the protagonist's lack of inwardness were itself a literary virtue...

=== Theme ===
Train Dreams examines the personal repercussions that accompany overwhelming loss in an individual. Literary critic Alan Warner sums up Grainier's fate as follows:

The denouement of Train Dreams is so tragic and surreal that the reader at first denies its grisly approach… it fulfills the book's theme, the collapse of the rational world for a decent man."

Critic Anthony Wallace comments on this key thematic element in the novel:

Grainier's life is a mystery from start to finish, a sort of blank space that he fills in and that we fill in with him. At the core of such fiction is the conviction that our lives will remain essentially mysterious to us—that as human beings we don't know what we are and cannot grasp our own experience. In the character of Robert Granier, though, Johnson seems to be suggesting that we need not understand our own lives in order to live them, enjoy them, fully inhabit them–and also that we might take some comfort in that, if in anything at all."

== Film adaptation ==
A film adaptation based on the novella was directed by Clint Bentley and written by Bentley and Greg Kwedar, and starred Joel Edgerton as Grainier, as well as Felicity Jones, Kerry Condon, William H. Macy, and Clifton Collins Jr. The film premiered at the 2025 Sundance Film Festival, where it was acquired by Netflix. The film was met with critical acclaim and earned four Academy Award nominations, including Best Picture.

== See also ==
- Thomas Hart Benton - whose painting The Race is used on the cover

== Sources ==
- Battersby, Eileen (January 17, 2015). "The Laughing Monsters by Denis Johnson: More Butch Cassidy than Le Carré". The Irish Times.
- English, Sandy (January 15, 2019). "The Largesse of the Sea Maiden—Short stories by American author Denis Johnson". World Socialist Web Site.
- Johnson, Denis. 2002. Train Dreams. Farrar, Straus and Giroux, New York. ISBN 9781847086617
- Wallace, Anthony (October 15, 2011). "Book Review: Denis Johnson's Beautiful, Haunting "Train Dreams"". The Arts Fuse.
- Wood, James (August 29, 2011). "Cabin Fever". The New Yorker.
