= The Laughing Monsters =

2014 novel by Denis Johnson

- First edition cover
- Author: Denis Johnson
- Language: English
- Genre: Spy novel; thriller
- Publisher: Farrar, Straus and Giroux
- Publication date: November 4, 2014
- Publication place: United States
- Media type: Print (hardcover)
- Pages: 228
- ISBN: 978-0-374-28059-8
- OCLC: 874970008
- Dewey Decimal: 813/.54
- LC Class: PS3560.O3745 L38 2014

The Laughing Monsters is a spy novel by Denis Johnson published in 2014 by Farrar, Straus and Giroux.

The Laughing Monsters is set largely in the African countries of Sierra Leone, Congo and Uganda in the aftermath of the Rwandan genocide of the 1990s, conflicts which Johnson witnessed and reported on as a journalist.

The title of the novel is a reference to the Happy Mountains of the Congo, where the novel's climax takes place. The mountain range was dubbed the Laughing Monsters by the 19th Century missionary James Hannington. The title also characterizes the two chief protagonists of the novel.

== Plot ==
Part One

Roland Nair, of Danish-American descent, arrives in Freetown, Sierra Leone from Amsterdam after a 10-year absence. He is 38 years-of-age. A NATO employee and CIA fiber-optic specialist, he trafficks high-value intelligence. He returns to Africa to renew his friendship with his former confederate Michael Adriko. Michael, a 36-year-old Ugandan of Arab-African descent, is a US trained combat mercenary, and a profiteer during the genocidal African wars of the 1990s. Nair (who goes by his last name) hopes to reestablish their lucrative partnership - and to collect information on Michael for Nato Intelligence Interoperability Architecture (NIIA). Tina is Nair's lover and a former NATO attorney in the Netherlands who unwittingly collaborates in his schemes.

Nair goes to a NIIA safehouse in Freetown and collects top secret documents: locations of maps of US military fiber-optics cables throughout West Africa and GPS coordinates of NATO safehouses he has arranged to fence for cash. Nair meets with Michael and his fiancée, Davidia St. Claire, a twenty-something Coloradan of African heritage who is a PhD candidate. Her father was once the garrison commander of the 10th Special Forces Group at Fort Carson, where Micheal trained for clandestine operations. Michael announces grandiose plans to establish himself and Nair as new-age warlords on adjoining estates in Africa. He divulges no details for his scheme.

At a NIIA safehouse, Nair is informed that Michael is AWOL from US special forces in the Congo, operating against the Lord's Resistance Army. The US unit is commanded by Davidia's father.

Nair meets with his intelligence Arab trafficker, Hamid, to fence his documents. A dispute arises over Nair's fee, and the deal is put on hold. Nair accompanies Michael and Davidia to Entebbe, Uganda and agrees to attend their proposed wedding.

Part Two

Michael reveals the scheme to get rich: selling adulterated Uranium-235 to a buyer in South Africa linked to the Mossad. Nair is deeply skeptical, but elicits nothing from his associate, only his mantra "More will be revealed." Nair suspects that NIIA is aware of some of these developments, and travels with the couple by bus to Arua, Uganda. Nair and Davidia discover they are attracted to one another, and agree to conceal this from Micheal.

Michael shows Nair the product he intends to market as Uranium-235: slabs of lead treated to activate a geiger counter. He concocts a story that the uranium was collected from a downed Russian airplane. A South African, with supposed Mossad backing, appears to be willing to pay one million for it. The buyer and his associate discover Michael's deception, and attack him with a knife. He brutally subdues both the men, and Nair escapes Michael. Nair accepts an offer from Hamid for 100,000 for his documents, and cuts his ties with NIIA. Michael, Davidia and Nair flee to the Congo in a land cruiser.

Part Three

The trio's car breaks down in a village. Before they can trek out on foot, a Congolese army unit descends on the hamlet, shooting villagers and raping several woman. The trio is captured. The commander engages in mock executions with villagers and with Michael. Michael discovers that the commander is part of his clan, and reassures Nair and Davidia,"We'll be fine" Nair is now deeply in love with her, and regrets that Michael was not executed.

Part Four

This section is delivered as missives to Tina and Davidia.

Michael escapes to return to Newada Mountain and his people. The Congolese turn Nair and Davidia over to the 10th Special Forces Group. Davidia is briefed and returned to the United States. Nair is held in detention, and undergoes days of verbal interrogation under "underantiterrorism" protocols by NIIA personnel, who wish to know Michael's location. Nair declines to tell them. Negotiations begin. Nair is released from custody and tasked with locating Michael to set him up for a drone assassination. Nair jettisons his gear en route, suspecting it contains tracking devices, determined to reunite with Michael. Nair treks from one devastated village to another. Severely dehydrated, he crawls into an abandoned hut. Upon waking, he discovers Michael in a violent and protracted dispute with the village queen, a madwoman. The old woman is his relative and Michael is challenging her authority. Nair informs him that Davidia has departed Africa, and Michael accuses him of perfidy, spurning him. The two men have a rapprochement and reconcile. Together they make their way back to Freetown, where Nair closes the deal for $100,000. Now wealthy, Nair and Micheal depart Freetown as a duo to seek other fortunes.

== Critical assessment ==
The novel's narrative form begins as a first-person confessional, then shifts to epistolary and closes as a "jailhouse journal". Though the shifts are disconcerting, critic Michael Mewshaw notes that "the power of Johnson's prose and the acuity of his eye" provides an acute portrayal of the conditions on the ground in urban and rural Africa, exceeding "almost any journalistic account".

The Laughing Monsters has elicited comparisons and contrasts Johnson with authors Graham Greene, Robert Stone and John le Carré. Literary critic Mark Lawson writes:

"The Laughing Monsters, especially in its Sierra Leone sections, walks in the steps of The Heart of the Matter, which was inspired by Greene's experience of Freetown, where Johnson's novel begins and ends."

Lawson adds that "The compelling majority [of The Laughing Monsters] depicts Africa through dismal Greene-like details." Critic Carol Memmott writes: "Comparisons inevitably will be made to the Africa-set espionage novels of Graham Greene and John le Carré, but…Johnson tells his stories in his own way, adjusting the genre's formula to suit his own needs."

Literary critic Eileen Battersby considers Johnson's novel more "parody" than a genuine "spy thriller" in the tradition of John le Carré:

In truth had any other writer written this, aside from perhaps Robert Stone, it might never have been published and the only reason for reading it is that Johnson is a gifted and admittedly, eccentric writer. There are far too many good spy thrillers out there waiting to be read to take this seriously."

== Genre and theme ==
Though Johnson considered The Laughing Monsters a "literary thriller', the precise genre of the novel is disputed by his critics. Novelist Stav Sherez points out that Johnson borrows the spy thriller genre merely as a "structuring principle" adding:

While the synopsis of The Laughing Monsters marks it out as a thriller, I'm not so sure it really is one. All the ingredients are there, but Johnson isn't aiming for an edge-of-your-seat page-turner. His goals are both more modest and more ambitious, and the novel rapidly turns into a sub-Saharan Catch-22. By eschewing the heroism, grandeur, and moral clarity of the traditional war novel and replacing it with a Kafkaesque farce where madness is the only sane option...

Critic Eileen Battersby points out that "the narrative is light years removed from Graham Greene and John le Carré...The Laughing Monsters is a slap happy variation of Catch-22. It may be intended as a thriller [but is] far too messily-executed to honor that genre."

Literary critic Michael Mewshaw states that The Laughing Monsters "is not so much a deconstruction as an obliteration of a genre."

The thematic elements of The Laughing Monsters is informed by the devastation that imperialism has inflicted on the African continent and the demoralization of those operatives who are tasked with effecting it. Critic Battersby notes that Johnson makes "a serious moral point about the way in which international spies have become the most recent colonialists in the ongoing rape of Africa." Journalist Carol Memmott writes:

Johnson vibrantly illustrates the poverty, sickness and hopelessness of Africa's indigent population. Monumental environmental problems, due to the pillaging of natural resources by governments and entrepreneurs, add another grim layer of darkness to Johnson's story."

Critic Michael Mewshaw observes "the power of Johnson's prose and the acuity of his eye [that] manages to convey a more convincing portrait of amoral intelligence agents and the havoc they wreak than almost any journalistic account of Third World skullduggery."

Author Shav Sherez notes the effects of this devastated milieu on Johnson's chief protagonist, fortune hunter Roland Nair:

Johnson paints the blighted burnt-out ruins of a continent with cool, precise prose. This isn't Greene's Africa nor Kapuściński's, but a modern Dantean hell; though it does share with Greene's a sense of languid dissipation, torpor and doubt, and the theme of men traveling to Africa in order to commit an honorable form of suicide. At one point, when captured by the Congolese Army, Roland, almost with a sigh of relief, admits that he has been taken by "people who would either bring order to my affairs in a prison or murder me and solve my life."

Sherez adds: "Roland Nair is an archetypal Johnson protagonist: passive, suicidal, gripped by delirium and religious yearnings. He is a man with no home and split loyalties, a stranger to himself and to those around him. In this, he is the perfect spy."

== Sources ==
- Battersby, Eileen (January 17, 2015). "The Laughing Monsters by Denis Johnson: More Butch Cassidy than Le Carré". The Irish Times.
- Johnson, Denis (2014). The laughing monsters : a novel (First ed.). New York: Farrar, Straus and Giroux. ISBN 978-0-374-28059-8. OCLC 874970008.
- Lawson, Mark (November 3, 2014). "The Laughing Monsters review – Denis Johnson's spy tale heads into Graham Greene territory". The Guardian.
- Memmott, Carol (November 20, 2014). "Review: 'The Laughing Monsters' by Denis Johnson". Chicago Tribune.
- Mewshaw, Michael (October 30, 2014). "Book World: Denis Johnson's 'The Laughing Monsters' offers more than formulaic thrill". The Washington Post.
- Sherez, Stav (November 13, 2014). "Fear and Loathing in Freetown". Los Angeles Review of Books.
