= The Incognito Lounge (poem) =

Sonnet by Denis Johnson

The Incognito Lounge is a sonnet by Denis Johnson and first published his collection The Incognito Lounge and Other Poems in 1982 by Random House. The poem has appeared in the Carnegie Mellon Classic Contemporary Series in 2008.

== Critical appraisal ==
"The Incognito Lounge" is a sonnet composed of nine "strophes" or stanzas.

The poem, one of Johnson's fifteen published sonnets, exhibits a degree of fidelity to these traditional literary forms unusual to Johnson's oeuvre . Poet and critic Jay Deshpande writes:

To be clear, Johnson was by no means a formalist. Most of his poems are free verse: whether writing lyric or narrative, he was not one for leaning heavily on literary convention. But in the sonnet, he found a home for both his maverick tendencies and his attachment to tradition: He even made practiced, dedicated use of rhyme.

Deshpande declares that "each sonnet is a crystalline example of what he gave to American letters." John Casteen identifies the urban landscape in which the poem unfolds:

"The Incognito Lounge" is set in an apartment complex and several bars of what I assume is probably Tucson, Arizona—Its speaker, with "my eyes closed and two / eyeballs painted on my face," is both present and not present, expressing but not perceiving. The meteor shower he compares figuratively to "these questions of happiness / plaguing the world" is, accurately enough, empirically there, real, and brilliant, but remote, unreachable; like the meteors, the questions appear less violent when one perceives them from such an incomprehensible distance. The poem's ambiguities mount as we get comfortable with its setting: the helicopter both asking and telling "whatwhatwhatwhatwhat" the synaesthetic gesture of the 'boiled / coffee that tastes like noise.'"

Nicholas Niarchos notes that "The Incognito Lounge" is set "in an apartment block with a [narrator] who revels in sightlessness ("I go everywhere with my eyes closed and two / eyeballs painted on my face"). He inhabits a world "right slam on the brink of language," where things tend to meld into one another…" In describing the sonnet's first strophe or stanza, critic Richard Miklitsch observes that Johnson abandons "acoustics…metrics…rhyme and enjambment" in favor of "an obsessive image…in this case, one of the most intimate and seemingly familiar of images, the human face." In Johnson's hands, the face undergoes a number of astonishing permutations:

A fantastic world this, one both frightening and fascinating where nothing is what it seems because nothing remains the same, because everything is always changing into something else…connected only by the speaker's compelling voice and episodic history he presents, scene by scene…

Miklitsch adds: "Johnson's imagination seems particularly suited to this kind of poem, one composed of seemingly self-contained anecdotes that, put together, produced a skewed but strangely satisfying story."

John Casteen discerns deeply reflexive conveyed through "The Incognito Lounge":

That poem seemed like reassurance to someone who understood the world the way we did, who was just as fucked up and just as hard-edged and merciless in writing his own experience, that someone like that could write something both sublimely beautiful and deeply, intimately personal. I don't just mean personal for the author; I mean personal for us."

== Sources ==
- Casteen, John (April 2, 2013). "John Casteen on Denis Johnson's "The Incognito Lounge"". Voltage Poetry.
- Deshpande, Jay (August 7, 2017). "My Denis Johnson". Poetry Foundation.
- Miklitsch, Michael (1983). "Review of "The Incognito Lounge and Other Poems"by Robert Miklitsch". The Iowa Review. Vol. 13, no. 3–4. pp. 246–250. doi:10.17077/0021-065X.2969.
- Niarchos, Nicolas (June 4, 2018). ""The Throne of the Third Heaven of the Nations Millennium General Assembly," by Denis Johnson". The New Yorker.
