= Aga Khan Prize for Fiction =

Writing award

The Aga Khan Prize for Fiction was awarded by the editors of The Paris Review for what they deem to be the best short story published in the magazine in a given year. The last prize was given in 2004. No applications were accepted. The winner got $1,000. The prize was established by Sir Sultan Mahommed Shah Aga Khan III, and was first awarded in 1956.

Although the money awarded is the same as many other literary awards in the United States, since the magazine itself attracts some of the most highly regarded authors, the winners of the prize are often highly esteemed writers, most of whom previously won other major literary awards or go on to do so, or both.

== Winners ==
- 2004: Annie Proulx, Issue 171, The Wamsutter Wolf
- 2003: Michael Chabon, Issue 166, for The Final Solution
- 2002: Denis Johnson, Issue 162, for Train Dreams
- 2001: Maile Meloy, Issue 158, Aqua Boulevard
- 2000: Marcel Möring, Issue 155, East Bergholt
- 1999: Robert Antoni, Issue 152, My Grandmother's Tale of How Crab-o Lost His Head
- 1998: Will Self, Issue 146, Tough Tough Toys for Tough Tough Boys
- 1997: David Foster Wallace, Issue 144, Brief Interviews with Hideous Men #6
- 1996: Patricia Eakins, Issue 140, The Garden of Fishes
- 1995: A. S. Byatt, Issue 133, The Djinn in the Nightingale's Eye
- 1994: Rick Moody, Issue 131, The Ring of Brightest Angels around Heaven
- 1993: Charles D'Ambrosio, Issue 126, Her Real Name
- 1992: Joanna Scott, Issue 123, A Borderline Case
- 1991: Jeffrey Eugenides, Issue 117, The Virgin Suicides
- 1990: Larry Woiwode, Issue 114, Summer Storms
- 1989: John Banville, Issue 113, The Book of Evidence
- 1987: Ben Okri, Issue 105, The Dream-Vendor's August
- 1985: Michael Covino, Issue 94, Monologue of the Movie Mogul
- 1984: Norman Rush, Issue 93, Instruments of Seduction
- 1983: Charlie Smith, Issue 88, Crystal River
- 1982: T. Coraghessan Boyle, Issue 84, Greasy Lake
- 1979: Norman Lock, Issue 76, The Love of Stanley Marvel & Claire Moon
- 1978: Dallas Wiebe, Issue 73, Night Flight to Stockholm
- 1977: C. W. Gusewelle, Issue 70, Horst Wessel
- 1976: Bart Midwood, Issue 66, John O'Neill versus the Crown
- 1975: David Evanier, Issue 61, Cancer of the Testicles
- 1974: Lamar Herrin, Issue 59, The Rio Loja Ringmaster
- 1973: Paul West, Issue 57, Tan Salaam
- 1967: Christina Stead, Issue 40, George
- 1965: Jeremy Larner, Issue 33, Oh, the Wonder!
- 1962: Albert J. Guerard, Issue 28, The Lusts & Gratification of Andrada
- 1961: Thomas Whitbread, Issue 24, The Rememberer
- 1958: Philip Roth, Issue 19, Epstein
- 1956: Gina Berriault, Issue 12, Around the Dear Ruin
- 1956: John Langdon, Issue 12, The Blue Serge Suit
- 1956: Owen Dodson, Issue 12, The Summer Fire (2nd Prize:)

== See also ==
- List of literary awards
