= Happyland (novel) =

2006 novel by J. Robert Lennon

Happyland is a satirical novel written by J. Robert Lennon about a town in upstate New York that is taken over by a doll maker. Some have interpreted the plot as an account of American Girl founder Pleasant Rowland's attempt to develop the village of Aurora, Cayuga County, New York, into a quaint tourism destination. The novel also features a women's college, very much like Rowland's alma mater Wells College and portrays it as a center of lesbian activity.

In 2006, Happyland was dropped by publisher W. W. Norton, which had previously published Lennon's book Mailman. Instead, it was published as a five-part serial in Harper's Magazine.
