= Seek: Reports from the Edges of America & Beyond =

- First edition
- Author: Denis Johnson
- Language: English
- Publisher: HarperCollins
- Publication date: April 24, 2001
- Publication place: United States
- Media type: Print
- Pages: 238
- ISBN: 0-06-018736-0

Seek: Reports from the Edges of America & Beyond is a 2001 collection of essays by Denis Johnson. The book chronicles the author's travels through Africa, Afghanistan, and America. Spanning two decades, his essays are generally sympathetic towards the obscure groups of people he encounters in his travels. The essays were previously published elsewhere, including in Esquire and The Paris Review. Seek is Johnson's first nonfiction collection.

== Contents ==
- "The Civil War in Hell"
- "Hippies"
- "Down Hard Six Times"
- "Bikers for Jesus"
- "Three Deserts"
- "The Militia in Me"
- "Run, Rudolph, Run"
- "The Lowest Bar in Montana"
- "An Anarchist's Guide to Somalia"
- "Jungle Bells, Jungle Bells"
- "The Small Boys' Unit"
