= Fiskadoro =

1985 novel by Denis Johnson

- First edition cover
- Author: Denis Johnson
- Language: English
- Genre: Post-apocalyptic fiction
- Publisher: Alfred A. Knopf
- Publication date: 1985
- Publication place: United States
- Media type: Print (hardcover)
- Pages: 221
- ISBN: 978-0-394-53839-6
- OCLC: 11533255
- Dewey Decimal: 813/.54
- LC Class: PS3560.O3745 F5 1985

Fiskadoro is a post-apocalyptic novel by Denis Johnson published in 1985 by Alfred A. Knopf.

The story is set in the former state of Florida several decades after a global nuclear holocaust. An enclave of survivors, bereft of collective historical knowledge, attempt to reassemble human society and culture.

== Plot ==
The story opens 60 years after a global nuclear holocaust. Only tiny enclaves of humans survive, one these in "Twicetown", in the region of the Florida Keys. Separate enclaves exist in the Everglades and at an Army compound, each with their own subcultures. The archives that could serve to reveal human history have been destroyed in the holocaust, and the surviving generations struggle to understand their origins. The 100-year-old Grandmother Wright is the only survivor whose life spans both pre- and post-apocalyptic periods. With the Christ-like adolescent boy, Fiskadoro, she attempts to discover the key to understanding the nature of human existence. Her grandson, Mr. Cheung, embarks on his own futile search for wisdom. Only Fiskadoro achieves an epiphany that leads him to genuine enlightenment.

== Critical assessment ==
Eva Hoffman of The New York Times, confirming Fiskadoro's post-apocalyptic pedigree, writes:

[T]he poet and novelist Denis Johnson attempts something much more daring and provocative. He doesn't entirely avoid the millenarian impulse. But his startlingly original book is an examination of the cataclysmic imagination, a parable of apocalypse that is always present and precedes redemption in a cycle of death and birth, forgetting and remembering."

Hoffman cautions: "[T]here is something in Fiskadoro that resists the reader's full submission, or suspension of disbelief."

Richard Eder of the Los Angeles Times offers fulsome praise for the novel: "...Johnson, author of the magical novel of a time after the nuclear holocaust—Fiskadoro—is remarkable and perfectly executed."

Michiko Kakutani, in her 1985 review of Fiskadoro writes:

Toward the end of the novel, these hallucinatory riffs become longer and longer, the prose increasingly windy...The reader is inclined, at moments, to say enough, but these moments are rare. Such is the power of the narrative that one can only finish Fiskadoro with admiration for Mr. Johnson's ambition—and a keen appreciation of his prodigal imagination.

Kakutani reprises her praise for the novel in 2017: "Plots in Mr. Johnson's books tend to be tangled, melodramatic affairs—often highly indebted to famous works by Conrad, Graham Greene and Robert Stone—in his lesser books...his writing can devolve into portentous philosophizing, larded with New Age and Nietzschean intonations...But in his masterworks—[among them] Fiskadoro...Johnson's incandescent language channels his characters' desperation."

== Theme ==
"What I write about is really the dilemma of living in a fallen world, and asking: 'Why is it like this if there's supposed to be a God?'"—Denis Johnson, quoted by Michiko Kakutani in Poetic Visions of a Fallen World (2017)

Literary critic Eva Hoffman, identifying Fiskadoro as "parable of apocalypse", writes:

Like all the reduced circumstances of Fiskadoro, this impoverished idiom is a way of posing certain fundamental questions. What, in a world stripped of accumulated cultural knowledge, are the minimal units of communication and meaning? What, in our naked helplessness, are the available modes of knowledge? And how, given the central fact of death, can we wake from the troubled sleep of denial?"

Literary critic Michiko Kakutani writes:

Mr. Johnson's America, past or present, is uncannily resonant today. It's a troubled land, staggering from wretched excess and aching losses, a country where dreams have often slipped into out-and-out delusions, and people hunger for deliverance, if only in the person of a half-baked messiah. Reason is in short supply here, and grifters and con men peddling conspiracy thinking and fake news abound; families are often fragmented or nonexistent; and primal, Darwinian urges have replaced the rule of law. And yet amid the bewilderment and despair, there are lightning flashes of wonder and hope—glimpses of the possibility of redemption"

== Sources ==
- Eder, Richard (March 3, 1991). "Mine Canary in a Noxious World: Resuscitation of a Hanged Man". The Los Angeles Times.
- Hoffman, Eva (May 26, 1985). "Postapocalyptic Fasotral". The New York Times.
- Kakutani, Michiko (May 1, 1985). "Books of The Times". The New York Times.
- Kakutani, Michiko (May 26, 2017). "Denis Johnson's Poetic Visions of a Fallen World". The New York Times.
