= Angels (novel) =

1983 novel by Denis Johnson

- First edition
- Author: Denis Johnson
- Language: English
- Genre: Fiction
- Published: 1983
- Publisher: Knopf
- Publication place: United States
- ISBN: 978-0060988821

Angels is a 1983 novel by American author Denis Johnson. It was Johnson's first novel; previously, he had published several books of poetry. Alice Hoffman, writing for the New York Times, referred to the novel as "a mixture of poetry and obscenity". Angels follows two characters – Jamie, a young mother fleeing her abusive husband, and Bill Houston, a restless ex-convict – who encounter one another on an interstate bus trip. Bill Houston also appears in Johnson's novel Tree of Smoke, which won the National Book Award in 2007.

In 1999, David Foster Wallace included the novel on his list of overlooked American novels published after 1960.
