= Jesus' Son (short story collection) =

1992 short story collection by Denis Johnson

- First edition cover
- Author: Denis Johnson
- Language: English
- Publisher: Farrar, Straus & Giroux
- Publication date: December 1, 1992
- Publication place: New York
- Media type: Print (hardcover)
- Pages: 160
- ISBN: 978-0-374-17892-5
- OCLC: 25873728
- Dewey Decimal: 813/.54
- LC Class: PS3560.O3745 J47 1992

Jesus' Son is a collection of short fiction by Denis Johnson published in 1992 by Farrar, Straus & Giroux. A short story cycle comprising 11 pieces, Jesus' Son is Johnson's most critically acclaimed and popular literary effort, and the work with which Johnson is most identified. It was adapted into a 1999 film by Elizabeth Cuthrell, David Urrutia, and Oren Moverman, directed by Alison Maclean.

== Stories ==
- "Car Crash While Hitchhiking"
- "Two Men"
- "Out on Bail"
- "Dundun"
- "Work"
- "Emergency"
- "Dirty Wedding"
- "The Other Man"
- "Happy Hour"
- "Steady Hands at Seattle General"
- "Beverly Home"

== Subject matter ==
The book takes its title from the Velvet Underground song "Heroin", and concerns the exploits of several addicts living in rural America as they engage in drug use, petty crime, and murder. The stories are linked by shared locations (such as a dive bar in small-town Iowa) and repeated imagery. They are all narrated by a troubled young man identified only as "Fuckhead" ("Emergency").

The book is known for its seemingly chaotic narrative style, which mirrors the mental state of its narrator and the disjointed perception of an addicted, drug-addled mind.

In "Car Crash While Hitchhiking" Fuckhead seems to have extra-sensory perception, which allows him to experience in the present a deadly car crash that won't happen until much later in the narrative. Despite his foreknowledge, he enters the car he claims to know will inevitably crash. "Emergency" picks up with Fuckhead while he's working a job as a hospital janitor and driving around under the influence of batches of prescription medications that he's stolen from the hospital. The orderly, with whom he takes a drug-fueled, bunny-killing trip, helps to save a man who's been stabbed in the eye by his wife (this character, Georgie, is also the one who reveals the nickname of the narrator).

The book ends on a more hopeful note as the final narrator enters a recovery program and begins to hold down a stable job writing a newsletter for the residents of a nursing home.

== Plots ==
=== "Car Crash While Hitchhiking" ===
In this story, a drug-addicted narrator recounts hitchhiking in four different vehicles, first with a Cherokee, then a salesperson, then a college student, and finally a family composed of a husband, wife, young daughter and a baby. The salesperson is drunk and shares alcohol and pills with the narrator before leaving him off to find a student who drives him until he catches a ride with the family. Eventually, this vehicle is struck by another car resulting in the death of the driver of the other car. The story ends with the narrator looking back several years later, seemingly in detox, as he recounts his drug abuse, which the entire narration of the story reflects in a style of disconnect from reality.

=== "Two Men" ===
The narrator and his friends Tom and Richard are thrust into the role of reluctant chaperons of a mute man who unexpectedly climbs into their vehicle one evening after a dance. They drive him to several locations, the narrator berating the man constantly, for he believes he isn't actually mute. Upon arriving at the last location they discover that the mute man is an ex high school football star, and now is an addict in the company of wrongdoers. This realization strikes the narrator, proving that even the most successful or popular people can still fall from grace. After they deposit the mute man at the last location, he pursues the narrator and his friends as they attempt to leave him behind. He makes it as far as grabbing the side of the car before he crashes into a stop sign. Later, they run into a man named Thatcher, who the narrator recognizes at a gas station. Thatcher is a dealer who sold the narrator bad cocaine, and the narrator proceeds to follow Thatcher to his house, brandishing his gun and spitting threats. When they break into his residence, they encounter a woman who begs them to leave and informs them that Thatcher isn't present. The narrator presses, but the woman pleads and tells them that there are only two little children in the other rooms. Upon further investigation, Tom and Richard discover that there are in fact only two little children in the house. Thatcher had climbed out of the window.

=== "Out on Bail" ===
The narrator reflects on the young life of a well known man who he had connections with named Jack Hotel who was well kept, but kept his crimes a secret, while shifting to talk about his hard life in the present. He spends his time drinking at a bar known as the Vine (a reoccurring setting that the narrator finds himself at in later stories), where the other guests have also spent much of their lives consumed in drug addiction. Jack is no longer facing criminal charges but he and the narrator steal checks to fund their habit. The narrator is grateful for the apartment they find because he is still living but he is even more grateful for his life in the present, after Jack ultimately dies of an overdose. He ends the story by reflecting: "I am still alive" which shows that he can't believe that with the state of his addiction, he is continuing with his life.

=== "Dundun" ===
This story recounts the narrator's attempt to obtain pharmaceutical opium from a friend named Dundun. Upon arriving at Tim Bishop's farm, where Dundun lives, the narrator finds Dundun outside pumping water. Dundun casually informs the narrator that he has shot McInnes, who is still alive and inside the farmhouse. The rest of the story recounts two failed attempts at saving McInnes' life. It is in this story where the narrator reveals that McInnes bequeathed him the name "Fuckhead."

=== "Work" ===
The narrator and his girlfriend rent a hotel and shoot up heroin. Afterwards, they get in a fight and she runs away, but ends up coming back the next morning. Eventually, she leaves him for good and the narrator, in his loneliness, goes to a bar and finds his friend there, Wayne. Wayne comes up with an idea to rip the copper wiring out of his old abandoned house and sell it as scrap. As they are working, they see a beautiful woman flying under a kite who later turns out to be Wayne's wife. The duo then end up going to the wife's house and Wayne talks to her about unknown matters. They go to the bar after selling the scrap and actually feel good about themselves as they did the closest thing to honest work for the first time in their lives. Wayne then narrowly avoids a fight that he picks. Later, as the bartender fills their shots up all the way to the top, the men have a rare feeling of joy and satisfaction. The narrator later reflects on the day as one of his favorite memories.

=== "Emergency" ===
Reprinted online at Narrative

=== "Dirty Wedding" ===
Taking place in Chicago, Dirty Wedding concerns the narrator's dysfunctional relationship with his girlfriend, Michelle, and the implications of the child they abort. 'I like to sit up front and ride the fast ones all day long,' begins the story. The narrator has a fascination with trains which he returns to after he asked to leave the abortion clinic where Michelle is undergoing her procedure. While riding the 'El' train, his attention is drawn to a man on the train. He follows this man to an all-night laundromat. The narrator overhears the man discussing with a friend the unjust accosting of "Benny" who was confronted by the cops after a man was murdered. The narrator is then addressed by the man but turns away (who is at this stage bare-chested in a jacket), finding he has an erection. He rides the train again and finds a girl 'messed up on skag.' He asks her for a share but she says it's all gone. She takes him to the Savoy Hotel where the narrator becomes overwhelmed by the bleak goings on, finding something troubling and self-reflective. He cuts to information about a man named John Smith, Michelle's new boyfriend. It is revealed Michelle purposefully overdosed to be found and saved by John Smith, but John Smith was too drunk to notice and found Michelle dead in the morning next to him in bed. The narrator reflects that he wasn't surprised John Smith then killed himself not too long after. The narrator turns almost reluctantly back to thoughts on the moral and ethical arguments surrounding abortion. He concludes in an ambiguous manner, it wasn't what the doctors did, it wasn't what the lawyers did, or the woman, 'It was what the mother and father did together.'

=== "The Other Man" ===
This story begins with the narrator saying, "But I never finished telling you about the two men." Up to this point, the audience is unaware that this is a continuation of the story "Two Men," believing the two men to be the mute man and Thatcher. This set up of stories shows how fragmented the narrator is, and how unreliable he can be, getting sidetracked by other tales and forgetting to finish complete thoughts. The second man turns out to be a Polish man who speaks in broken English. The narrator and the Polish man converse at a bar in Seattle before the Polish man reveals that he is not actually Polish; he is from Cleveland. The narrator responds with nonchalance, before leaving and attempting to meet up with this friends Maury and Carol. A woman, presumably Maury and Carol's landlady, chases the narrator away and threatens to call the cops when he becomes belligerent. Later he winds up at another bar, and dances with a woman who he desperately wants to have sex with. It is revealed that the woman has been married for four days, but that does not stop them.

=== "Happy Hour" ===
The narrator attempts to find a seventeen-year-old belly dancer at various dive bars in Seattle. The story takes place in the span of a single day, but the narrator recounts seeing the belly dancer for the first time and staying in the same bed with her the previous night. He eventually learns that the belly dancer, Angelique, has left town which deeply saddens him.

=== "Steady Hands at Seattle General" ===
Two men converse with each other while in detox at Seattle General Hospital. The two men are the narrator and his roommate, Bill. Both characters mention different types of drugs such as alcohol, cigarettes, and most importantly Haldol. Haloperidol is an antipsychotic drug, therefore we understand that the character is struggling with addiction. Knowing this gives the story a different tone because we understand that the characters are probably not thinking clearly. The narrator and Bill are in detox frequently, and they do not see it as a negative thing. They simply live one day at a time and being in detox is just part of their lives. Bill reveals that this life of drugs and detox he lives cannot be sustained much longer. At the end of story, the narrator tells Bill he is going to be all right, but Bill disagrees with him by pointing to the bullet hole on his face.

=== "Beverly Home" ===
This story begins with the narrator discussing his job at a home for disabled people called "Beverly Home." He lists some of the more unusual clients of the home, then details how he starts watching a woman shower after work every day. The narrator shares his thoughts of raping her, but would be ashamed to be seen by her. Eventually, the woman's husband comes home and the narrator decides to leave. He also details his romantic relationship with a woman whose arms and legs are disproportionately small. Despite the fact that the narrator claims to not want to get to know this woman very well, they often eat out at Mexican restaurants, where the narrator learns that this woman works at an airline ticket counter. During this relationship, he continues watching the woman shower, eventually becoming obsessed with the idea of watching her and her husband have sex. He never sees them have sex, instead he sees them argue and make up. After this, he starts dating a woman who suffered from encephalitis as a child, and half of her body is paralyzed as a result. Her paralysis is significantly worse in the morning, which the narrator calls "unwholesome, and very erotic." The narrator then discusses the woman's ex-boyfriends, many of whom have died and the narrator pities. The story ends with the narrator, a recovering drug addict, noting that he is getting a little better every day in the midst of people who he calls "weirdos." Yet, he still identifies with them as he expresses his surprise that there is a place for "people like us."

== Critical assessment ==
Jesus' Son has enjoyed great praise since its publication in 1992 and is widely recognized as "beloved" and "iconic", as well as having the effect of making the author "deified."

Kirkus Reviews stated that the stories were "Blunt and gritty: Johnson's beautifully damned stories sing with divine poetry, all the while bludgeoning us with existential reality." Meanwhile, Publishers Weekly found that "for the most part the stories are neurasthenic, as though Johnson hopes the shock value of characters fatally overdosing in the presence of lovers and friends will substitute for creativity and hard work from him. Even the dialogue for the most part lacks Johnson's usual energy." Andrew Pulver, writing for The Guardian, similarly found that "It's only real weakness is that some of the characterisation is painfully thin—as if heroin chic was applied to the script as well as the art direction—and the junkies are such blank slates, it's hard to summon much empathy for their plight."

James McManus, in The New York Times, appreciated Johnson's tackling of the subject matter, stating that his prose, here and in other works, "consistently generates imagery of ferocious intensity, much of it shaded with a menacing, even deranged sense of humor. No American novelist since William Burroughs has so flagrantly risked 'insensitivity' in an effort to depict the pathology of addiction." Nathan Englander, for NPR, similarly stated: "With dialogue that feels like you're getting it verbatim and stripped-down prose, he writes simple, honest stories that have the bigness of great work."

According to literary critic Kevin Zambrano, "It's no wonder, twenty-five years [after its publication], Jesus' Son has become a staple of writing workshops across America—its voice is that of a totally free mind, able to say anything." He adds that Jesus' Son is "the book with which Johnson is most often identified." The anonymous narrator of these stories, delivered from a first-person confessional point-of-view, has endeared Johnson to his readership. Critic J. Robert Lennon wrote:

The work we all loved best was Jesus' Son. Unassuming in presentation and readable in one sitting, the book was narrated in a gently self-deprecating, conversational style by a protagonist who, though unnamed, sheepishly lets it be known that people call him "Fuckhead."

William Giraldi, reflecting on the short story collection in Poets & Writers, stated that "We go to Jesus' Son precisely because in its most sublime moments it reveals to us a condition both lesser and greater than human. We go to it for the flawlessness of its aesthetic form, its transformative spiritual seeing, and the beauty, the deathless beauty, of sentences that sing of possible bliss."

Author Jim Lewis called Jesus' Son "a small collection of eccentric and addictive short stories … But unlike most books about the dispossessed, they're original and what's more, deliriously beautiful—ravishing, painful; as desolate as Dostoyevsky, as passionate and terrifying as Edgar Allan Poe."

Acknowledging Johnson's "serious artistic accomplishments", critic Sandy English noted the absence of historical social antecedents in Jesus' Son;

Overall, the characters are not engaging, and the life depicted here is not that intriguing. The writing effectively reflects the addled thoughts of addled people existing in a netherworld. Johnson recognizably and articulately identifies that netherworld. But after a number of decades and much more poisoning of youth by opioids and other substances—one wants fiction to have a broader sweep about and understanding of the issues.

== Influences ==
Denis Johnson cited Isaac Babel's Red Cavalry as an important influence, saying dismissively that the collection was "a rip-off of Isaac Babel's Red Cavalry" in an interview with New Yorker fiction editor Deborah Treisman.

== Film adaptation ==
In 1999, the book was adapted into a film of the same name starring Billy Crudup, Samantha Morton, Denis Leary, Jack Black, Dennis Hopper and Holly Hunter. It was directed by Alison Maclean. The film was well received by critics but had limited distribution and earned only $1.3 million. Johnson appears in the film briefly, playing the role of a man stabbed in the eye by his wife.

== Sources ==
- Corbett, Gavin (February 17, 2018). "The Largesse of the Sea Maiden by Denis Johnson review: sublime last book". The Irish Times.
- English, Sandy (January 15, 2019). "The Largesse of the Sea Maiden—Short stories by American author Denis Johnson". World Socialist Web Site.
- Giraldi, William (January 22, 2018). "Denis Johnson is gone, but he left us one last sublime collection of stories". The Washington Post.
- Jollimore, Troy (January 11, 2018). "Denis Johnson's legacy of grace evident in new, posthumous story collection". Chicago Tribune.
- Lennon, J. Robert (May 9, 2018). "The Intersection of Souls". The Nation.
- Lewis, Jim (September 2, 2007). "The Revelator". The New York Times.
- Simpson, Mona (February 24, 1991). "God and Man in Provincetown". The New York Times.
- Smith, Clay (July 7, 2000). "Defining the Name of the World". The Austin Chronicle.
- Walsh, David (July 19, 2000). "They'll wait and see". World Socialist Web Site.
- Zambrano, Kevin (January 10, 2018). "Less Brilliant But More Profound: Denis Johnson's The Largesse Of The Sea Maiden". The Rumpus.
