= Denis Johnson =

American novelist and poet (1949–2017)

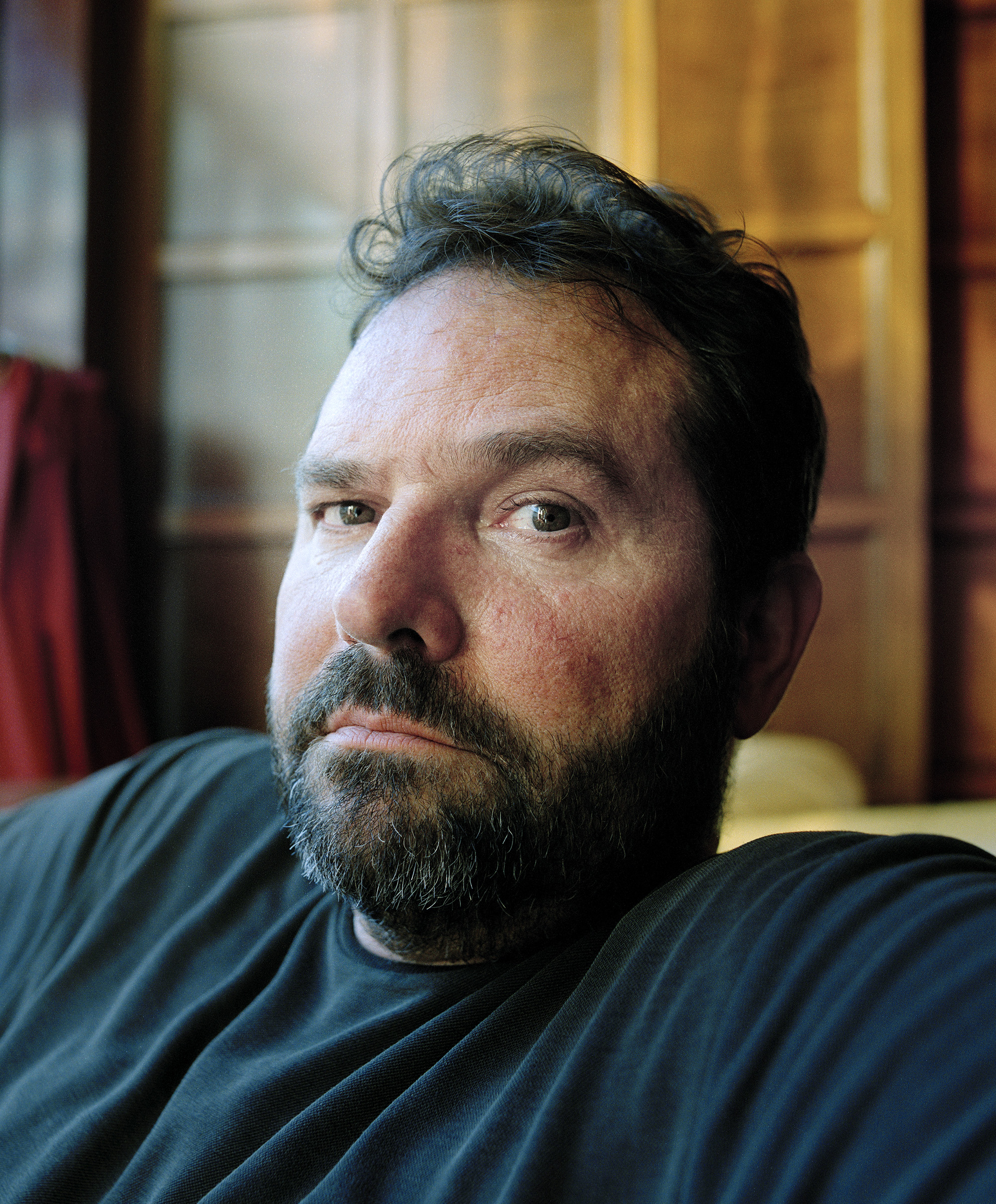
- Denis Johnson photographed by Oliver Mark, Berlin 2003
- Born: Denis Hale Johnson; July 1, 1949; Munich, West Germany
- Died: May 24, 2017 (aged 67); Gualala, California, U.S.
- Education: University of Iowa (BA, MFA)
- Occupations: Novelist; poet; playwright
- Writing career
- Period: 1969–2017
- Genres: Fiction, nonfiction
- Notable works: Angels; Jesus' Son; Train Dreams; Tree of Smoke
- Notable awards: National Book Award; National Poetry Series award

Denis Hale Johnson (July 1, 1949 – May 24, 2017) was an American novelist, short-story writer, and poet. He is perhaps best known for his debut short story collection, Jesus' Son (1992). His most successful novel, Tree of Smoke (2007), won the National Book Award for Fiction. Johnson was twice shortlisted for the Pulitzer Prize for Fiction. Altogether, Johnson was the author of nine novels, one novella, two books of short stories, three collections of poetry, two collections of plays, and one book of reportage. His final work, a book of short stories titled The Largesse of the Sea Maiden, was published posthumously in 2018. Ted Geltner's biography of Johnson, Flagrant, Self-Destructive Gestures, appeared in late 2025.

== Early years ==
Denis Johnson was born on July 1, 1949, in Munich, West Germany. Growing up, he also lived in the Philippines, Japan, and the suburbs of Washington, D.C. His father, Alfred Johnson, worked for the State Department as a liaison between the USIA and the CIA. His mother, the former Vera Louise Childress, was a homemaker. He earned a B.A. in English (in 1971) from the University of Iowa and an M.F.A. (in 1974) from the Iowa Writers' Workshop, where he also returned to teach. While at the Writers' Workshop, Johnson took classes from Raymond Carver. He said, "My ear for the diction and rhythms of poetry was trained by—in chronological order—Dr. Seuss, Dylan Thomas, Walt Whitman, the guitar solos of Eric Clapton and Jimi Hendrix, and T.S. Eliot. Other influences come and go, but those I admire the most and those I admired the earliest (I still admire them) have something to say in every line I write."

== Career ==
Johnson published his first book, a collection of poetry titled The Man Among Seals, in 1969 at the age of 19. In 1979, the Arizona Commission on the Arts and Humanities awarded him a fellowship, and he taught creative writing at the state prison in Florence, Arizona, from 1979 to 1981. This life-changing experience, in particular his work with two death-row inmates, impelled Johnson to finish his debut novel Angels (1983).

The Stars at Noon (1986), a spy thriller, follows an unnamed American woman during the Nicaraguan Revolution of 1984. It was adapted into the 2022 film Stars at Noon, directed and co-written by Claire Denis and starring Joe Alwyn and Margaret Qualley.

Johnson came to prominence in 1992 with the short story collection Jesus' Son, which included vignettes originally published in The New Yorker, inspired by Isaac Babel's book Red Cavalry. The first story, "Car Crash While Hitchhiking", was published in The Paris Review. In a 2006 New York Times Book Review poll, Jesus' Son was voted one of the best works of American fiction published in the last 25 years. It has been variously described as: seminal, legendary, transcendent, a classic, and a masterpiece. It was adapted into the 1999 film of the same name, which starred Billy Crudup. Johnson has a cameo role in the film as a man who has been stabbed in the eye by his wife.

Tree of Smoke won the 2007 National Book Award for Fiction and was a finalist for the 2008 Pulitzer Prize for Fiction. It takes place during the Vietnam War, spanning the years 1963–70, with a coda set in 1983. In the novel, we learn the history of Bill Houston, a main character in Johnson's first novel Angels.

Train Dreams, originally published as a story in The Paris Review in 2002, was published as a novella in 2011 and was a finalist for the 2012 Pulitzer Prize for Fiction. However, for the first time since 1977, the Pulitzer board did not award a prize for fiction that year. The novella was adapted into a film with the same title, directed and co-written by Clint Bentley. It premiered at the 2025 Sundance Film Festival and was acquired by Netflix to premiere the same year.

Johnson's plays have been produced in San Francisco, Chicago, New York, and Seattle. He was the Resident Playwright of Campo Santo, the resident theater company at Intersection for the Arts in San Francisco. In 2006 and 2007, Johnson held the Mitte Chair in Creative Writing at Texas State University in San Marcos, Texas. Johnson also occasionally taught at the Michener Center for Writers at the University of Texas at Austin.

The final book he published was the novel The Laughing Monsters, which he called a "literary thriller" set in Uganda, Sierra Leone, and Democratic Republic of the Congo. It was released in 2014. Johnson's final work, a book of short stories titled The Largesse of the Sea Maiden, was published posthumously in January 2018.

== Personal life ==
Johnson was twice divorced and lived with his third wife, Cindy Lee, in Phoenix, Arizona, at the time of his death. They also shared a home in Idaho. Johnson had three children, two of whom he homeschooled; in October 1997, he wrote an article for the website Salon in defense of homeschooling.

For most of his 20s, Johnson was addicted to drugs and alcohol and did not do much writing. In 1978, he moved to his parents' home in Scottsdale, Arizona to sober up and find direction. He stopped drinking alcohol in 1978 and quit recreational drugs in 1983.

In his essay "Bikers for Jesus," Johnson described himself as "a Christian convert, but one of the airy, sophisticated kind."

== Death ==
Johnson died on May 24, 2017, from liver cancer at his home in The Sea Ranch, a community near Gualala, California, at the age of 67.

Three Rules To Write By

Write naked. That means to write what you would never say.

Write in blood. As if ink is so precious you can't waste it.

Write in exile, as if you are never going to get home again, and you have to call back every detail.

— Denis Johnson

== Awards and nominations ==
- 1981 – National Poetry Series award (selected by Mark Strand), for The Incognito Lounge
- 1983 – The Frost Place poet in residence
- 1986 – Guggenheim Fellowship
- 1986 – Whiting Award
- 1993 – Lannan Fellowship in Fiction
- 2002 – Aga Khan Prize for Fiction from The Paris Review, for Train Dreams
- 2007 – National Book Award, for Tree of Smoke
- 2008 – Pulitzer Prize for Fiction finalist, for Tree of Smoke
- 2012 – Pulitzer Prize for Fiction finalist, for Train Dreams
- 2017 – Library of Congress Prize for American Fiction (awarded posthumously)

== Works ==
=== Novels ===
- Angels (Knopf, 1983) ISBN 9780394532257
- Fiskadoro (Knopf, 1985) ISBN 9780394538396
- The Stars at Noon (Knopf, 1986) ISBN 9780394538402
- Resuscitation of a Hanged Man (Farrar, Straus & Giroux [FSG], 1991) ISBN 9780374249496
- Already Dead: A California Gothic (HarperCollins, 1997) ISBN 9780060187378
- The Name of the World (Harper, 2000) ISBN 9780060192488
- Tree of Smoke (FSG, 2007) ISBN 9780330449205
- Nobody Move (FSG, 2009)
- Train Dreams (FSG, 2011) – a novella first published in The Paris Review [2002] and in Europe [2004]
- The Laughing Monsters (FSG, 2014) ISBN 9780374280598

=== Short fiction ===
- Jesus' Son (FSG, 1992) ISBN 9780374178925
- The Largesse of the Sea Maiden (Penguin/Random House, 2018) ISBN 9780812988635

=== Poetry ===
- The Man Among the Seals: Poems (Stone Wall Press, 1969) ISBN 9780887486272
- Inner Weather (Graywolf Press, 1976)
- The Incognito Lounge and Other Poems (Random House, 1982) ISBN 9780394523477
- The Veil (Alfred A. Knopf, 1987) ISBN 9780394743431
- The Throne of the Third Heaven of the Nations Millennium General Assembly: Poems Collected and New (Harper Perennial, 1995) ISBN 9780060926960
- "Last Night I Dreamed I Was in Mexico" (Ploughshares 36.4, 2010, p. 58)
- "The Trees Leaning into One Another, Green and Horrible" (Ploughshares 36.4, 2010, p. 59)

=== Plays ===
- Hellhound on My Trail: A Drama in Three Parts (2000)
- Shoppers: Two Plays (Harper, 2002) ISBN 9780060934408- includes Hellhound on My Trail
- Psychos Never Dream, Campo Santo Theater, San Francisco (2004)
- Des Moines, San Francisco premiere in October 2007
  - Des Moines, New York premiere in November 2022
- Soul of a Whore and Purvis: Two Plays in Verse (FSG, 2012) ISBN 9780374277963

=== Screenplays ===
- The Prom (1990) (directed by Steven Shainberg)
- Hit Me (1996) (directed by Steven Shainberg, adapted from the novel A Swell-Looking Babe by Jim Thompson)

=== Nonfiction ===
- (contributor) One Man By Himself: Portraits of John Serl (Hard Press, 1995) ISBN 9789110224940
- "The Civil War in Hell". Esquire. December 1, 1990.
- "The Militia in Me". Esquire. July 1, 1995.
- "Change your life FOREVER: God's Warriors in the Third Millennium". Salon. March 22, 1996. Archived from the original on August 24, 2000.
- "School is out". Salon. October 1, 1996. Archived from the original on January 20, 2013.
- "Hippies". Paris Review. June 1, 2000. Archived from the original on July 22, 2017.
- "The small boys' unit". Harpers. October 1, 2000.
- Seek: Reports from the Edges of America & Beyond (essays) (HarperCollins, 2001) ISBN 9780060187361
