= Stars at Noon (2022 film) =

2022 film by Claire Denis

- Theatrical release poster
- Directed by: Claire Denis
- Screenplay by: Claire Denis; Léa Mysius; Andrew Litvack
- Based on: The Stars at Noon by Denis Johnson
- Produced by: Olivier Delbosc
- Starring: Margaret Qualley; Joe Alwyn; Benny Safdie; Danny Ramirez; John C. Reilly
- Cinematography: Éric Gautier
- Edited by: Guy Lecorne
- Music by: Tindersticks
- Production companies: Curiosa Films; Arte France Cinéma; Ad Vitam; Canal+
- Distributed by: Ad Vitam Distribution
- Release dates: 25 May 2022 (Cannes); 14 June 2023 (France)
- Running time: 137 minutes
- Country: France
- Language: English
- Box office: $225,509

Stars at Noon is a 2022 English-language French romantic thriller film directed by Claire Denis, based on the 1986 novel The Stars at Noon by Denis Johnson, starring Margaret Qualley, Joe Alwyn, Benny Safdie, Danny Ramirez, and John C. Reilly.

The film was selected to compete for the Palme d'Or at the 2022 Cannes Film Festival, where it premiered to mixed reviews and won the Grand Prix. Critics praised Qualley's performance but criticized the film's pacing and the chemistry between Qualley and Alwyn. It was released in the United States by A24 on 14 October 2022. It was released in France by Ad Vitam Distribution on 14 June 2023.

== Plot ==
Trish is a young American journalist stranded in Nicaragua during the COVID-19 pandemic and amid a period of severe governmental instability. She is a travel writer whose coverage of brutal extrajudicial killings has alienated both her superiors and the ruling party; her passport has been confiscated and she is living in a flophouse paid for by a sympathetic cabinet minister. Trish assumes that she will be executed for her anti-government activities when the minister can no longer protect her. She has sex with government officials for money and basic necessities (largely unavailable due to the political crisis) while searching desperately for a way out of the country.

One day, Trish solicits a British man named Daniel for sex in a hotel reserved for wealthy foreigners. Daniel introduces himself as a petrochemicals consultant, but Trish assumes that he is really an intelligence agent. They have passionate, tender sex, and Trish follows him the day after. She observes him meeting with a man she identifies as a Costa Rican police officer. When questioned about the meeting, Daniel is surprised to hear of the man's true identity, eventually realizing his hostile intentions after the officer chases the two through a market.

Trish lets Daniel hide out in the flophouse. The Costa Rican officer quickly finds them, but he is unwilling to attack Daniel in a building protected by a governmental official. Trish and Daniel fall in love. The climax of their emotional bond occurs in a deserted nightclub, where they dance romantically as he speaks about his wife.

Eventually, Trish is informed that the government can no longer protect her; she runs out of money and Daniel is cut off by his employer. Realizing that they will be killed by the Costa Rican once they leave the hotel, the two steal a car and drive towards a border. Along the way, they meet a man who Trish quickly realizes is a CIA agent. The man offers Trish safe passage to the U.S. in exchange for Daniel, but Trish refuses. At the border, the agent offers her the same deal, and questions how they will cross the border without Trish's passport. It becomes clear that the agent and the Costa Rican are colluding with the authoritarian government, while Daniel is in some way trying to destabilize it.

Trish and Daniel trade the car to smugglers in exchange for a boat ride across the border. At the end of the journey, the smugglers are shot dead by unseen soldiers and Daniel is wounded. They make their way to an abandoned church and fall asleep. When they wake up, the agent and the Costa Rican, along with armed troops, have surrounded them. Daniel convinces Trish to abandon him, and the soldiers take him away. A Nicaraguan police officer and former client of Trish's returns her passport, allowing her to legally fly home. The agent pays her and leaves.

== Cast ==
- Margaret Qualley as Trish Johnson
- Joe Alwyn as Daniel DeHaven
- Benny Safdie as CIA Man
- Danny Ramirez as Costa Rican Cop
- Nick Romano as Subteniente Veraguas
- Stephan Proaño as Vice-Minister
- Monica Bartholomew as La Señora
- Carlos Bennett as Mercado Taxi Driver
- Sebastián Donoso as Taxi Driver Trish
- Hector Moreno as Travel Agent
- Robin Duran as Costa Rican Border Captain
- Jose Leonel Hernandez as Nightwatchman
- Cristian Pulido as Taxi Driver Daniel
- John C. Reilly as American Magazine Editor

== Production ==
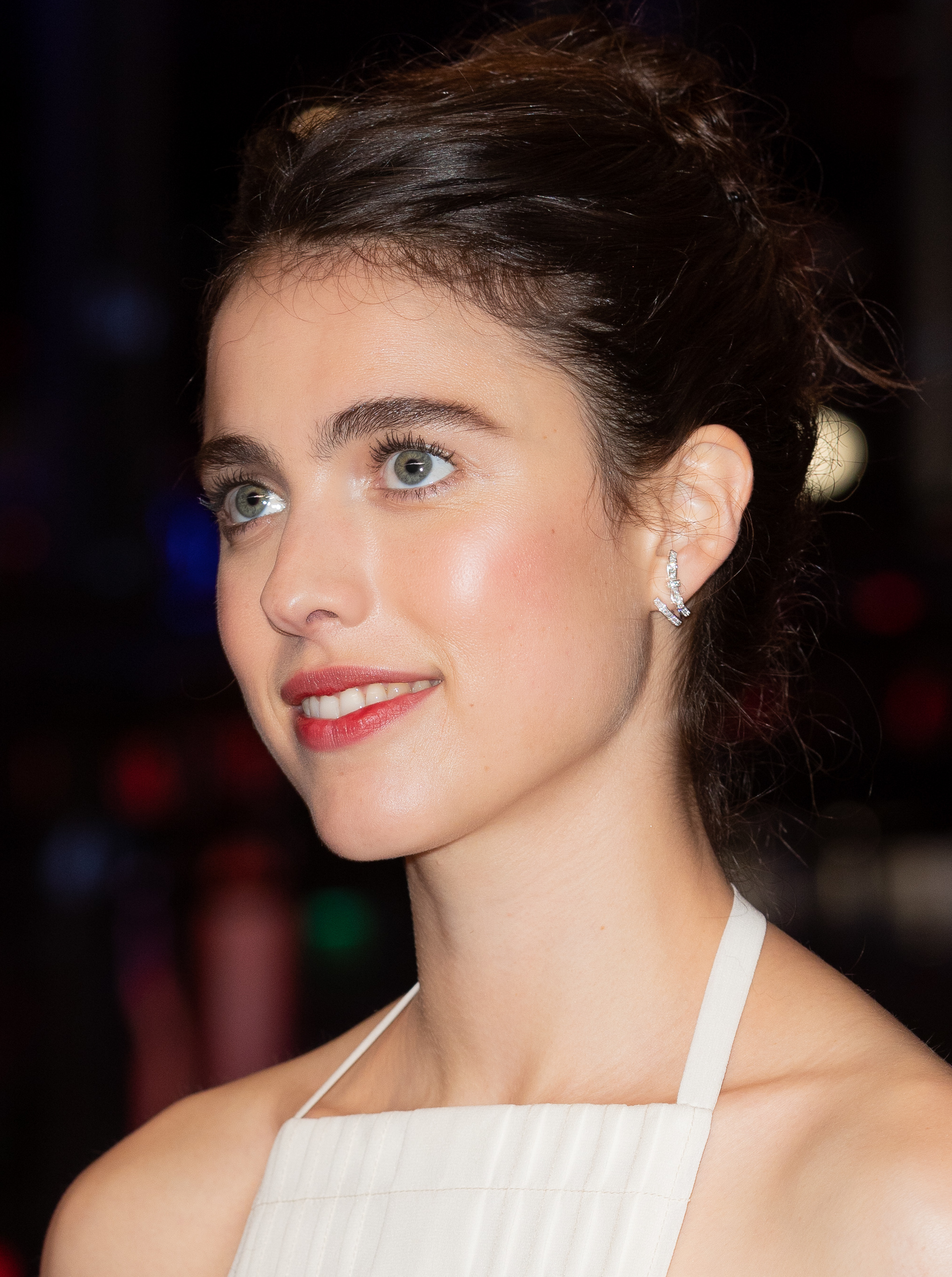
Margaret Qualley

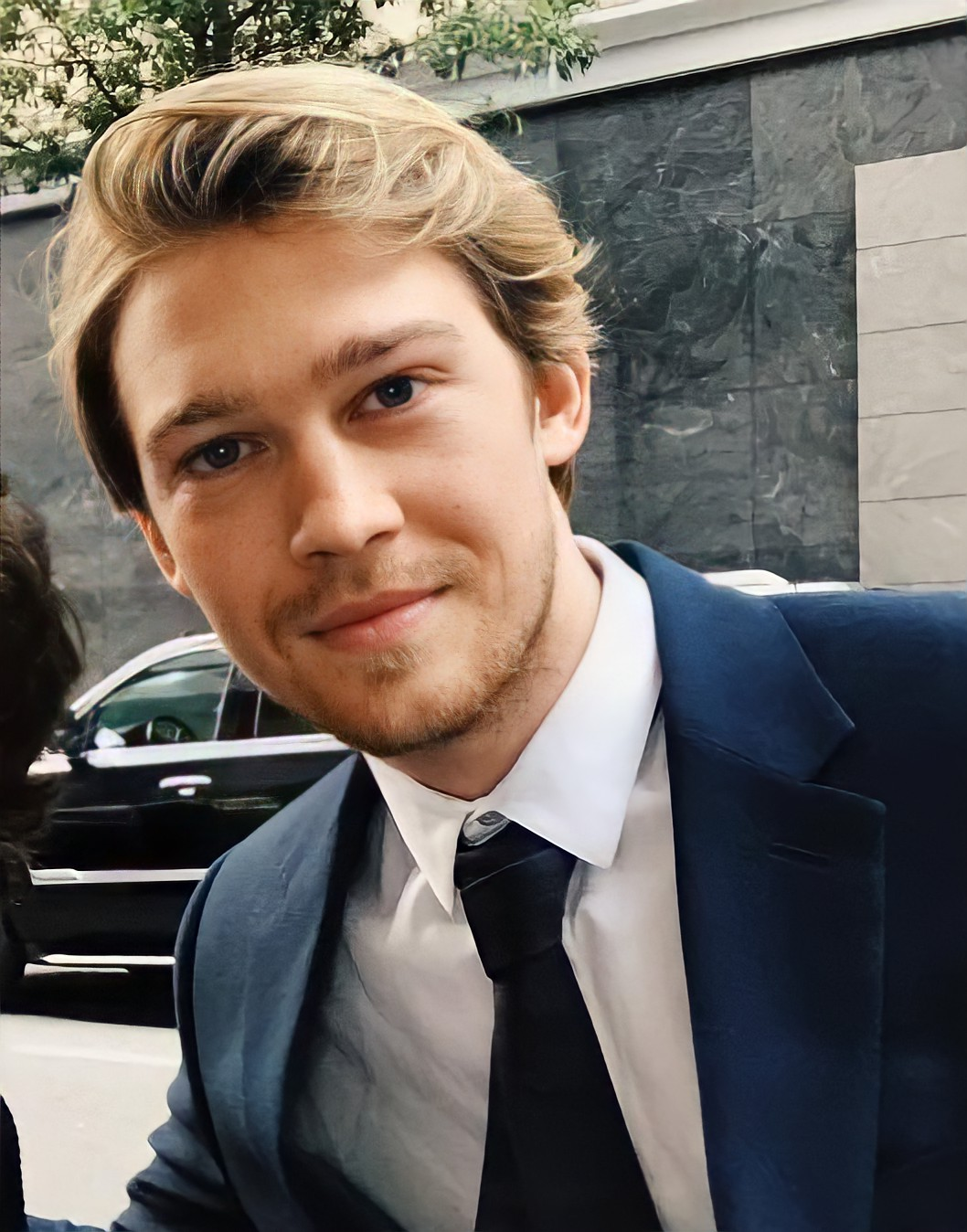
Joe Alwyn

Claire Denis had read Johnson's novel a decade earlier and assessed it as a love story between two people who develop a relationship solely within the heightened context of the revolution. She added, "It's also about the fear and the terror of love, the fear of failure."

In April 2019, Denis tentatively announced the film's development and casting of Robert Pattinson after a screening at the Brattle Theatre of her 2018 film High Life, which also starred Pattinson.

It was announced in February 2020 that A24 had acquired North American distribution rights to Claire Denis's next directorial effort, with Robert Pattinson and Margaret Qualley as leads. Filming was planned to begin that summer. Delayed because of the COVID-19 pandemic, filming was later expected to begin in April 2021 but did not begin at that time. Pattinson left the film because of scheduling conflicts by July. Taron Egerton was cast to replace him, and filming was projected to start in October 2021 in Panama. When it was delayed, in November Egerton left the project for personal reasons.

Egerton was replaced by Joe Alwyn. In January 2022 Danny Ramirez was announced as part of the cast. Additional casting, including Benny Safdie and John C. Reilly, was reported in April.

Filming began in November 2021 in Panama and wrapped in December 2021. Denis had wanted to shoot the film in Nicaragua, but decided against it after the re-election of President Ortega. She said, "I knew I could not, it would have been immoral."

== Music ==
Stars at Noon (Original Soundtrack)

Soundtrack album by Tindersticks
- Released: 14 October 2022
- Labels: Lucky Dog; City Slang

Singles from Stars at Noon (Original Soundtrack)
- 1. "Stars at Noon" Released: 6 October 2022

The music of the film was composed by the English alternative rock band Tindersticks, who have contributed the music to many of Claire Denis's previous films. The soundtrack was officially announced on 6 October 2022, with the title track released as a single the same day. The soundtrack was released on 14 October 2022, via City Slang.

Original track listing
No.	Title	Length
1.	"Introduction"	0:34
2.	"Opening"	2:36
3.	"Taxi Across Town"	2:30
4.	"Hotel Bar"	4:32
5.	"Dawn Walk Home"	3:14
6.	"Los Periquitos"	2:02
7.	"The Mercado"	1:15
8.	"Motel Rain"	1:40
9.	"The Costa Rican"	2:54
10.	"Stars at Noon"	3:39
11.	"Blood Hands"	1:57
12.	"Burning Car"	3:24
13.	"The Consultant"	1:38
14.	"Blood Hands (Version)"	1:53
15.	"Apache"	1:35
16.	"The Bridge"	1:14
17.	"The Crossing"	1:12
18.	"The Costa Rican (Reprise)"	2:54
19.	"Stars at Noon" (instrumental)	3:32
Total length:		44:15

== Release ==
The film was selected to compete for the Palme d'Or at the 2022 Cannes Film Festival, where it had its world premiere on 25 May 2022. At Cannes, it was the co-winner of the Grand Prix. It was released by A24 in the United States and on demand on 14 October 2022. The film began streaming on Hulu on 28 October 2022. Wild Bunch International handled the international distribution sales for the film. The film was released in France by Ad Vitam Distribution on 14 June 2023.

== Reception ==
=== Critical response ===
The film premiered to mixed reviews. On Rotten Tomatoes, 63% of 110 reviews are positive and the average rating is 6/10. The website's consensus reads, "Short on romantic sparks and frustratingly sedate, Stars at Noon is carried by a talented cast and Claire Denis' formidable control of her craft." According to Metacritic, which assigned a weighted average score of 65 out of 100 based on 29 critics, the film received "generally favorable" reviews.

Guy Lodge of Variety wrote, "The American setting and perspective may be new for her; the rest, from the film's bristling, dust-licked atmospherics to its frank, corporeal eroticism to yet another shivery, enveloping score by longtime collaborators Tindersticks, is vintage Denis." Lodge reserved praise for Qualley's "wry, whirling performance" and the "hardboiled dialogue she delivers with just the right touch of affected cool". Lodge also commended Alwyn for playing the "deliberately gauzy, hard-to-hold" character of Daniel in an "aptly, alluringly secretive fashion". David Ehrlich of IndieWire praised the film's dialogue, writing that it is "only strengthened by its occasional awkwardness, as it subsumes Trish and Daniel into the same disordered humidity that swamps the film around them. The frequent sex scenes become a dialogue of their own — the lovers feeling each other out in search of something they can actually trust." Ehrlich also wrote that Alwyn's "natural recessiveness suits a role defined by its cool-headed stability. Ben Croll of TheWrap praised Denis' "tonal control" and Qualley's "non-verbal tics" for elevating the dialogue. Robbie Collin of The Daily Telegraph wrote, "Stars at Noon is at its best when it has Trish and Daniel suspended in horny limbo, with Denis building an atmosphere of sultry languor that makes the film feel as if it's constantly stretching and circling, like a sleepy cat." Collin praised Qualley as a "revelation", comparing her to a young Juliette Binoche, and described Alwyn as "suavely persuasive" in his role. In a 4 out of 5 star review, Nicholas Barber of BBC praised the film's "beguiling, immersive" quality and Qualley's "firecracker energy" but found the dialogue confusing and the plot drifted too much.

David Rooney of The Hollywood Reporter deemed the film to be "a major misfire" that is "almost perversely lacking in dramatic texture or momentum" and criticized the "chemistry-deficient" performances by Qualley and Alwyn, the latter of whom Rooney panned as "mostly an empty white linen suit". Charles Bramesco of The Playlist called it "marred by compromise at every phase of its production, it's a rare misfire from one of our most accomplished living auteurs, excusable only on merit of her past successes." In a 3 out of 5 star review, Peter Bradshaw of The Guardian felt the film was "reasonably acted" but concluded that "the romantic passion and duplicity don't come across as strongly as they might have done with leads who had a stronger chemistry." Bradshaw characterized Qualley and Alwyn's performances as sometimes "callow" and felt they were both "outclassed" by Safdie's performance, however Bradshaw commended Qualley for "nicely [conveying] neediness, alcoholism and self-reproach" in her performance. Caspar Salmon of The Daily Beast agreed, writing, "Both are miscast, both lack chemistry, and neither of them has a very fun time with the dialogue." Paste's Natalia Keogan held similar criticism, writing, "Alwyn's performance is commendable [...] but he can’t quite keep up with Qualley, and their chemistry is practically non-existent." Todd McCarthy of Deadline Hollywood wrote that "Qualley is pretty engaging in the early going" but lamented that the film is "thoroughly lacking in political context, psychological nuances, investigation of local conditions and simple suspense that the whole thing just collapses from the lack of any sturdy dramatic fortifications." Tara Brady of The Irish Times gave the film 1 out of 5 stars, writing that the film was "undone by bad timing, repetition, general disarray, and the framing of the female lead as Holly Golightly." Ryan Leston /Film called the film "so slow it doesn't really seem to go anywhere." Iana Murray of The Skinny said the film "moves so slowly that it's stagnant" and criticized Alwyn's performance and casting, but called Qualley's performance "magnetic".

=== Accolades ===
Award	Date of ceremony	Category	Recipient(s)	Result	Ref.
Cannes Film Festival	28 May 2022	Grand Prix	Claire Denis	Won	
Cannes Film Festival	28 May 2022	Palme d'Or	Claire Denis	Nominated	
Panama International Film Festival	4 December 2022	Audience Award	Claire Denis	Nominated	
