= Tree of Smoke =

2007 novel by Denis Johnson

- First edition cover
- Author: Denis Johnson
- Language: English
- Publisher: Farrar, Straus & Giroux
- Publication date: September 4, 2007
- Publication place: United States
- Media type: Print
- Pages: 624

Tree of Smoke is a 2007 novel by American author Denis Johnson. The novel follows a man named Skip Sands who joins the CIA in 1965 and begins working in Vietnam during the American involvement there. The time frame of the novel is from 1963 to 1970, with a coda set in 1983. One of the novel's protagonists is Bill Houston, who was the main character in Johnson's 1983 debut novel Angels. Tree of Smoke won the National Book Award for Fiction and was a finalist for the Pulitzer Prize.

== Plot ==
Tree of Smoke is a novel about the Vietnam War. It primarily follows William "Skip" Sands, a newly minted CIA agent operating in Vietnam during the American insurgency. It also follows James Houston, an infantry private, his brother Bill, and a Canadian nurse named Kathy Jones. The novel moves between 1963 and 1970, setting its epilogue in 1983, in the aftermath of the war. The eponymous Tree of Smoke is a vast collection of index cards containing intelligence collected by Skip's uncle, the WWII war hero and CIA operative Colonel Francis Xavier Sands.

William "Skip" Sands is a newly-minted member of the CIA psychological operations (psyops) team. He is following in the footsteps of his uncle, Colonel Francis Xavier Sands, a hard-drinking WWII war hero and legendary CIA operative. Colonel Sands assigns Skip the daunting task of copying and cross-referencing a huge set of index cards containing information about people, places, and events. The Colonel believes these cards, which he calls the Tree of Smoke, represent vital intelligence that will help the Americans win the war. Skip soon realizes that the information is outdated and useless, but he continues to work on the task.

Skip is sent by his uncle to Mindanao, Philippines to gather intelligence on a priest suspected of gun running. Though Skip finds no such evidence, the priest is nevertheless assassinated by Dietrich Fest, a German assassin contracted by the CIA. Skip believes this murder to be a grave error, but does not mention the Colonel's involvement in his report. As a reward and per Skip's request, the Colonel has Skip sent to the Foreign Language School in Monterey, California, to learn Vietnamese. He is later reassigned to Vietnam.

Initially, Skip believes that he will become an important part of the war effort; however, he is assigned to a remote village where he has little contact with anyone other than his two house servants. He is living under an alias where he is supposed to be compiling information about local folklore and fairy tales, as the Colonel believes learning about the local culture will help win the war. Meanwhile, reminiscent of another Colonel - Colonel Kurtz - Colonel Sands has commandeered a platoon of army infantrymen at a makeshift base called the Landing Zone (LZ). The Colonel, with his henchman Sergeant Jimmy Storm, use their army platoon to map Vietcong tunnels in an operation known as Labyrinth. However, during the Tet offensive, the Colonel's platoon suffers heavy losses, and the Colonel mercy kills a VC POW who is being tortured by the American soldiers.

The Colonel is stripped of his LZ command, operation Labyrinth is terminated, and he is ordered to return to CIA headquarters - an order which he characteristically ignores. The Colonel, who fancies himself a warrior philosopher, comes under further scrutiny by CIA brass when an incendiary article challenging CIA practices authored by the Colonel is leaked by a subordinate named Voss. It becomes increasing apparent to Skip that the Colonel is becoming unhinged.

More rogue than ever, Colonel Sands devises a plan to use a double agent to get misinformation in the hands of the Vietcong. Working through a South Vietnamese man named Hao, a disillusioned VC soldier and childhood friend of Hao's named Trung Than, who earlier in the novel fails to assassinate the Colonel, agrees to be that double agent. Colonel Sands orders Skip to use his limited knowledge of the Vietnamese language to learn everything he can about Trung. They spend only a short time together before Colonel Sands learns that the operation has been compromised. He accuses Skip of having passed information on to Voss and their superiors at the CIA (though the real mole is Hao, who is angling to get relocated from Vietnam through any means necessary). Meanwhile, Trung is moved to a small hotel where the assassin Fest is sent to kill him. Jimmy Storm, however, learns of plot and kills Fest, allowing Trung to escape.

Colonel Sands dies under mysterious circumstances and his legend continues to grow. Skip learns that the CIA now intends to blame him for all the mistakes and illegal activities performed under the Colonel's orders. Another American operative helps Skip escape and disappear for several years. He begins a new, but troubled life, and, in 1983, is eventually found guilty of running guns in Malaysia. He and all the members of his operation are hanged.

The novel concludes with Jimmy Storm, who believes that the larger-than-life Colonel is still alive, on a quasi-mythological quest throughout Southeast Asia to find the Colonel or the truth of his demise.

While the story of Skip and Colonel Sands provide central narrative, there are several side plots in the novel. Bill and James Houston are half-brothers who are members of the American military during the Vietnam years. They each sporadically send money home to their mother but both wind up spending most of their pay on alcohol and women. Bill returns to the United States earlier than James. He struggles for awhile and spends some time in prison. He seems to be getting his life together by the time James returns to the U.S. Bill sees James going down the same path and is frustrated when James won't listen to reason and winds up in prison.

A nurse named Kathy who is working for a Canadian NGO is widowed at an early age when her husband, a missionary in the Philippines, is killed. She winds up working for an organization that arranges adoptions for Vietnamese orphans. She has a brief affair with Skip and struggles with her faith throughout the novel.

Hao and Kim are a Vietnamese couple. Hao, whose nephew Minh is a helicopter pilot working for Colonel Sands, aligns himself with Colonel Sands in order to win a relocation out of South Vietnam. However, he soon begins feeding information about the double agent Trung to other CIA agents as well. At the close of the novel, the couple leave Vietnam as payment for his information.

== Title ==
There are several references in the novel to the title phrase, which has Biblical origins in three cited passages: Song of Solomon 3:6; Book of Joel 2:30, 31; and Exodus 33:9, 10.

== Characters ==
- Colonel Francis X. Sands – Retired Air Force colonel and war hero. Uncle of Skip Sands and head of Psy Ops for the CIA in Southeast Asia.
- William Skip Sands – CIA officer in Philippines and Vietnam who works under his uncle's tutelage.
- Kathy Jones – Canadian NGO worker in the Philippines and Vietnam.
- James Houston – Army private, and later LRRP, in Vietnam. Although not technically under the command of Colonel Sands, he is a member of Echo Reconnaissance of Delta company which is under the direction of Psy Ops.
- Bill Houston – Brother of James Houston who initially serves in the Navy.
- Burris – Youngest brother of James and Bill Houston
- Sergeant Jimmy Storm – Operative for Colonel Sands in Psy Ops.
- Nguyen Hao – Vietnamese businessman serving as driver and operative for Colonel Sands.
- Minh – Nephew of Nguyen and helicopter pilot in the Vietnamese air force but works more directly for Colonel Sands.
- Kim Hao – Wife of Nguyen Hao.
- Thu – Nephew of Nguyen Hao and brother of Minh who kills himself by self-immolation.
- Trung Than – Childhood friend of Nguyen Hao who is a member of the Vietcong but with the help of Nguyen agrees to become a double agent.
- Sergeant Harmon – Commander of James Houston in Cao Phuc who is badly wounded in a firefight.
- Dietrich Fest – German assassin who kills Father Carignan and later attempts to kill Trung Than.
- Father Carignan – Priest in Mindanao who is assassinated for allegedly running guns for the communists.

== Reception ==
Tree of Smoke was swiftly cited as one of the Best Books of 2007 by The New York Times, whose reviewer, Jim Lewis, called the book "a massive thing and something like a masterpiece". Time magazine's Lev Grossman named it one of the Top 10 Fiction Books of 2007, ranking it at #5. Grossman praised the book as "the most ambitious novel of the year, and one of the greatest." Tree of Smoke won the 2007 National Book Award for Fiction and was a finalist for the 2008 Pulitzer Prize for Fiction. It was listed at number 100 in the New York Times' list of 100 Books of the 21st century in 2024.

Brian Reynolds Myers, in The Atlantic, wrote a highly critical review of both the book and its author, opining that "once we Americans have ushered a writer into the contemporary pantheon, we will lie to ourselves to keep him there." In Literary Review, John Dugdale wrote: "Johnson's expertise in dialogue and atmosphere means it works on the level of the individual scene, suggesting that his natural form is the short story; but when it comes to overall structure and main plotlines, Tree of Smoke is tellingly dependent on reworking other fiction."

Michael Coffey, writing for Publishers Weekly, remarked, "Is this our last Vietnam novel? One has to wonder. What serious writer, after tuning in to Johnson's terrifying, dissonant opera, can return with a fresh ear?" He also stated, with the novel's ending, "you feel that America's Vietnam experience has been brought to a closure that's as good as we'll ever get." Kirkus Reviews stated that, with the novel, "Denis Johnson has bigger whales to land in his longest and most ambitious work to date" and that "As the novel obliterates all distinctions between good and evil, allies and enemies, loyalty and betrayal, it sustains the suspense of who will survive long enough to have the last word."

Norman Rush, in The New York Review of Books, said: "Tree of Smoke is an ambitious, long, dense, daunting novel sited at the heart of a great American evil, the Vietnam War ... Like the war itself, Tree of Smoke delivers an intense experience of loss, shame, futility, confusion—all without benefit of editorializing."
