= Eva Hoffman =

Polish-American writer and academic

Eva Hoffman (born Ewa Wydra on 1 July 1945) is an internationally acclaimed, award-winning writer and academic.

== Early life and education ==
Eva Hoffman was born in Kraków, Poland, shortly after World War II. Her parents, Boris and Maria Wydra, survived the Holocaust by hiding in a forest bunker and then by being hidden by Polish and Ukrainian neighbours. In 1959, at the age of 13, she emigrated with her parents and sister to Vancouver, British Columbia. Upon graduating from high school she received a scholarship and studied English literature at Rice University in Houston, Texas, the Yale School of Music, and Harvard University. She received her Ph.D. from Harvard in English and American literature in 1975.

== Career ==
Hoffman has been a professor of literature and creative writing at various institutions, such as Columbia University, the University of Minnesota, Tufts, MIT, and CUNY's Hunter College. From 1979 to 1990, she worked as an editor and writer at The New York Times, serving as deputy editor of Arts and Leisure, and senior editor of the Book Review, and reviewing regularly herself.

In 1990, she received the Jean Stein Award from the American Academy of Arts and Letters and in 1992, the Guggenheim Fellowship for General Nonfiction, as well as the Whiting Award. In 2000, Eva Hoffman was the Year 2000 Una Lecturer at the Townsend Center for the Humanities at the University of California, Berkeley. In 2008, she was awarded an honorary DLitt by the University of Warwick.

She has written and presented programmes for BBC Radio, and is the recipient of the Prix Italia for a radio work combining text and music. She has lectured internationally on subjects of exile, historical memory, human rights and other contemporary issues. Her work has been translated internationally, and she was awarded an honorary DLitt from Warwick University in 2008. She is a Fellow of the Royal Society of Literature, and is currently a visiting professor at the Institute for Advanced Studies at University College, London.

In her 1989 memoir, Lost in Translation, Hoffman tells the story of her experience immigrating to America from a post-World War II Poland.

Hoffman presently lives in London.

== Family ==
She married Barry Hoffman, a fellow Harvard student, in 1971. The couple divorced in 1976.

== Works ==
- Lost in Translation: A Life in a New Language (1989)
- Exit into History: A Journey Through the New Eastern Europe (1993)
- Shtetl: The Life and Death of a Small Town and the World of Polish Jews (1997)
- The Secret: A Fable for Our Time (2001)
- After Such Knowledge: Memory, History and the Legacy of the Holocaust (2004)
- Illuminations. A Novel (2008), US: Appassionata (2009)
- Time: Big Ideas, Small Books (2009)
- How to Be Bored (2016)
- On Czeslaw Milosz (2023)

Fjellestad writes on Lost in Translation: A Life in a New Language: "[It] is, to the best of my knowledge, the first "postmodern" autobiography written in English by an emigre from a European Communist country." She also writes that in the memoir, "Hoffman re-visions and reconstructs her Polish self through her American identity, and re-examines her American subjectivity through the memory of her Polish selfhood."

== Sources ==
- Aleksandra Ziolkowska-Boehm, Amerykanie z wyboru [Americans by Choice], Warsaw 1998, pg. 298-310; ISBN 83-900358-7-1
