= Already Dead: A California Gothic =

1997 novel by Denis Johnson

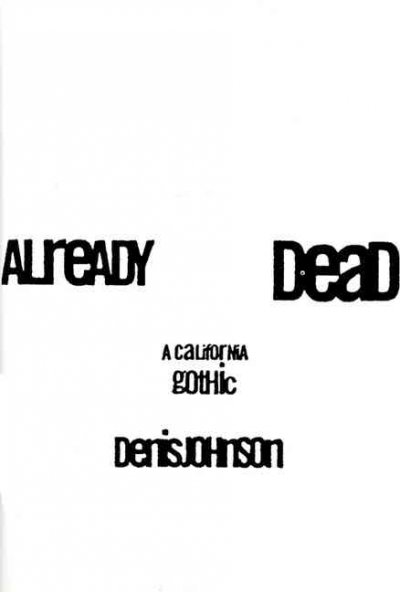
- First edition cover
- Author: Denis Johnson
- Language: English
- Publisher: HarperCollins
- Publication date: August 1, 1997
- Publication place: United States
- Media type: Print
- Pages: 435
- ISBN: 978-0-06-018737-8
- OCLC: 36241673
- Dewey Decimal: 813/.54
- LC Class: PS3560.O3745 A79 1997

Already Dead: A California Gothic is a 1997 novel by American author Denis Johnson. It was published by HarperCollins on August 1, 1997.

== Synopsis ==
In Mendocino County, California, Nelson Fairchild, Jr., an alcoholic marijuana grower, plots the murder of his wife Winona. Nelson is anxiously waiting to inherit his dying father's undeveloped coastal property and timber fortune. In a bid to prevent him from divorcing Winona, Nelson's father has willed his inheritance to Winona. Nelson hopes to use part of the inheritance to pay off a $92,000 debt he owes to cocaine dealer Harry Lally after failing to complete a job for him. He becomes paranoid and suspects Lally has hitmen tracking him down. After Nelson saves loner Carl Van Ness from a suicide attempt, Van Ness agrees to take on the responsibility of killing Fairchild's wife. Nelson, meanwhile, is in love with his hippie mistress Melissa, an Austrian woman who is herself carrying on an affair with a towering man nicknamed Frankenstein. Nelson is also anticipating a healthy return on his high-quality marijuana crops with his growing-partner Clarence Meadows, an avid surfer.

The novel features a nonlinear narrative, jumping back and forth between events in 1990 and 1991. The book alternates between first-person and third-person throughout, including mid-chapter.

== Reception ==
Michiko Kakutani of The New York Times panned the novel, calling it a "inept, repugnant novel" and "a virtually unreadable book that manages to be simultaneously pretentious, sentimental, bubble-headed and gratuitously violent."

In a mixed review, Kirkus Reviews wrote that it "[moves] right along, despite its bulk, and the writing is frequently charged with energy and wit. But it contains a little too much of everything: fashionable despair, New Age meandering, and fitful little explosions of overcalculated violence."
