= Jim Lewis (novelist) =

American novelist

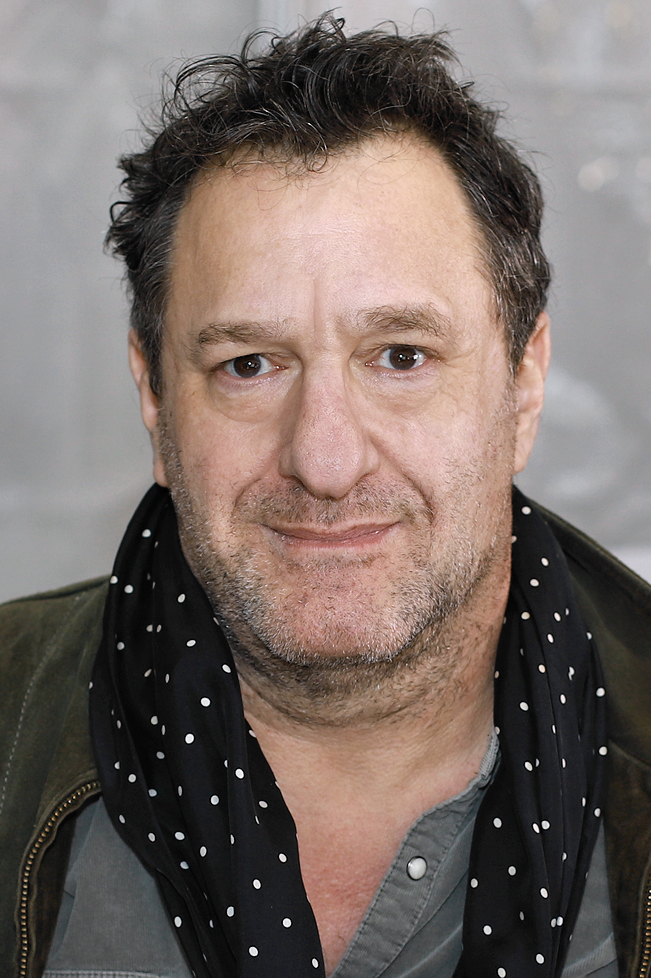
- Lewis at the 2022 Texas Book Festival
- Born: 1963 (age 62–63); Cleveland, Ohio, U.S.
- Occupation: Novelist

Jim Lewis (born 1963, in Cleveland, Ohio, raised in New York and London) is an American novelist.

He has published four novels, Sister (published by Graywolf in 1993), Why the Tree Loves the Ax (published by Crown in 1998), The King is Dead (published by Knopf in 2003), and Ghosts of New York, (WVU Press, 2021). They have been individually translated into several languages, including French, Norwegian, Portuguese, Italian, Polish, and Greek. Both "The King is Dead" and "Ghosts of New York" were on the New York Times' '100 Notable Books of the Year' list, for the year of their publication.

In addition to his novels, he has written extensively on the visual arts for dozens of magazines, from Artforum and Parkett to Harper's Bazaar, and contributed to more than 30 artist monographs, for museums around the world, among them, Richard Prince at The Whitney Museum of American Art, Jeff Koons at the San Francisco Museum of Modern Art, Christopher Wool at The Los Angeles Museum of Art, Robert Gober at the Glenstone Foundation, and a Larry Clark retrospective at the Musee d’Art Moderne de la Ville de Paris.

He has collaborated with the photographer Jack Pierson on a small book called Real Gone (published by Artspace Books in 1993), and with Cecily Brown on the book The English Garden, (KARMA, 2015).

He has also written criticism and reportage for a wide range of publications, among them The New York Times, Slate, George, Rolling Stone, GQ, and Vanity Fair. Aside from art and literature, he has reported on the Civil War in the Congo, rioting in Paris, the life of refugees, true crime and the design and ideology of prisons; as well as perfume, ballet, and Faberge Eggs. His essays have appeared in Granta, and Tin House, among others.

He currently lives in Austin, Texas.
