= J. Robert Lennon =

American writer (born 1970)

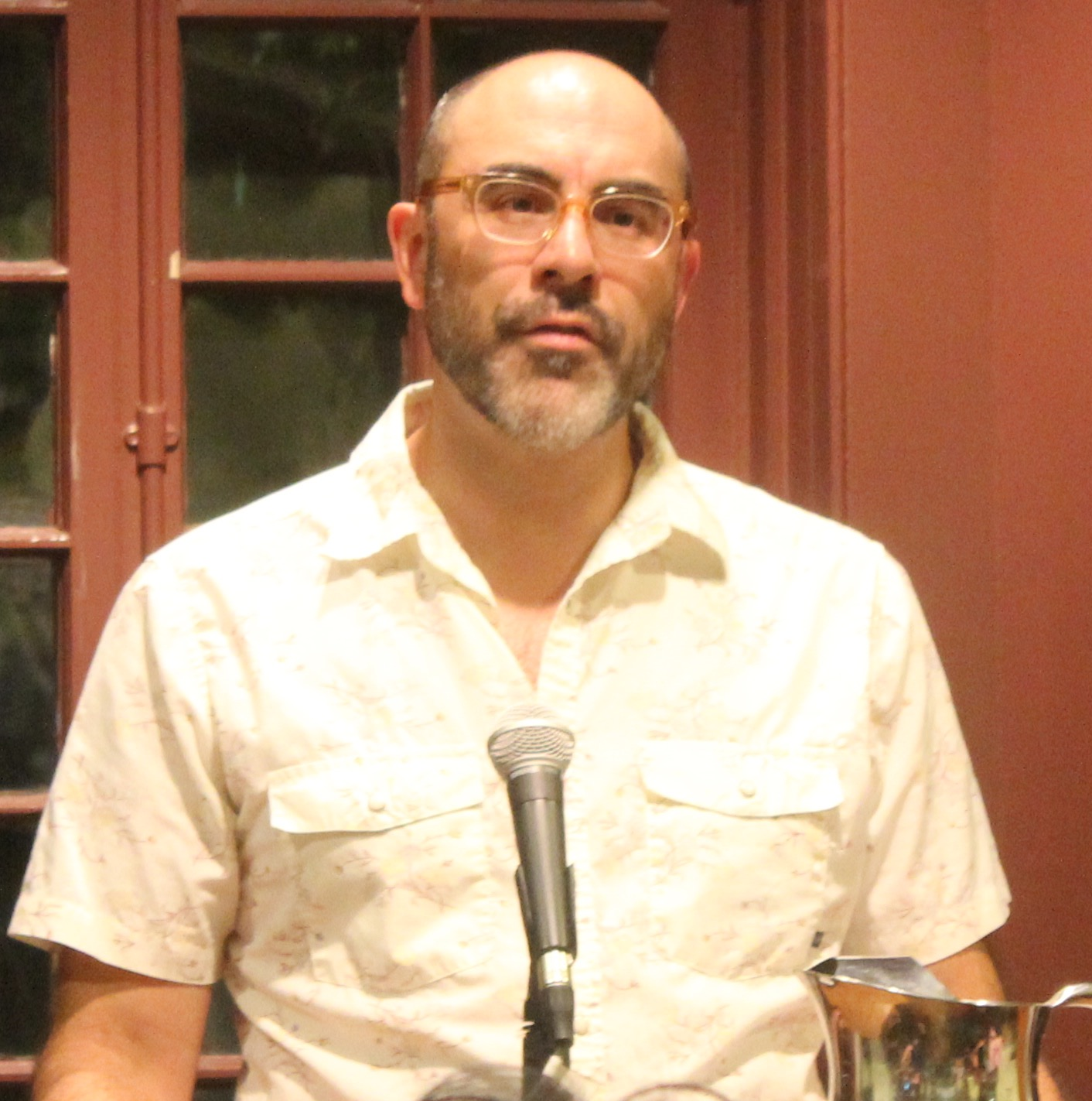
- Lennon in 2015
- Born: John Robert Lennon; 1970 (age 55–56)
- Education: University of Pennsylvania (BA); University of Montana (MFA)
- Occupations: Novelist; short story writer; musician; composer
- Writing career
- Genre: Fiction
- Website: jrobertlennon.com

John Robert Lennon (born 1970) is an American novelist, short story writer, musician and composer.

== Biography ==
Lennon was raised in Phillipsburg, New Jersey. He earned a B.A. in English from the University of Pennsylvania (1992) and an M.F.A. (1995) from the University of Montana.

Since 2011 he has been an associate professor, and director of the Creative Writing Program, at Cornell University. He resides in Ithaca, New York.

== Fiction ==
Lennon's first novel, The Light of Falling Stars (1997), about the aftermath of a plane crash, was the winner of Barnes & Noble's 1997 Discover Great New Writers Award. His fourth novel, Mailman, was released to critical success in 2003 and concerns a mail-carrying protagonist named Albert Lippincott who is clearly losing his mind. The book won praise for its humorous portrayal of the sadness of everyday life.

His other books include The Funnies (1999), a comedy about a would-be cartoonist; On the Night Plain (2001), a noir western set in the 1940s; and Pieces for the Left Hand: 100 Anecdotes (2005), a collection of 100 very short stories. His novel Happyland is roughly based around the American Girl doll company creator Pleasant Rowland. It was dropped by publisher W. W. Norton and subsequently published in serial by Harper's Magazine. In 2009, Graywolf Press published a new novel, Castle, and reissued Pieces For The Left Hand, which was appearing for the first time in the U.S. His 2008 short story "The Rememberer" is the basis of the CBS television drama Unforgettable. His work has also appeared in The New Yorker. In April 2021, he published both a novel Subdivision and a new collection of short stories, Let Me Think, which was a finalist for The Story Prize.

His 2024 novel Hard Girls was recommended under the "whodunit" category of the March 2024 issue of BookPage magazine. Staff reviewer Bruce Tierney wrote that Hard Girls was "an original, multilayered and quite engrossing thriller".

== Music ==
Lennon is also a musician and composer. As a solo artist, recording as Inverse Room, he has released three full-length CDs, Simulacrum (2002), Pieces for the Left Hand (2005) (a companion to the book of the same title), and American Recluse (2007). He is also one half, along with musician Jim Spitznagel, of The Bemus Point, which has released one CD, Infra Dig (2005). In the early 1990s he fronted the band Wicked Bison, playing the Philadelphia bar and fraternity scene.

== Bibliography ==
=== Novels ===
- The Light of Falling Stars (1997)
- The Funnies (1999)
- On the Night Plain (2001)
- Mailman (2003)
- Happyland

- (2006; abridged, serial publication)
- (2013; complete, e-book)

- Castle (2009)
- Familiar (2012)
- Broken River (2017)
- Subdivision (2021)
- Hard Girls (2024)
- Buzz Kill (2025)

=== Short story collections ===
- Pieces for the Left Hand (2005) contains 100 short stories:
  - "Dead Roads"
  - "Election"
  - "The Current Event"
  - "Claim"
  - "Opening"
  - "Copycats"
  - "Town Life"
  - "Rivalry"
  - "Get Over It"
  - "Composure"
  - "Silence"
  - "The Pipeline"
  - "Leaves"
  - "Shortcut"
  - "Witnesses"
  - "Switch"
  - "The Wristwatch"
  - "Underlined Passages"
  - "The Mary"
  - "Intruder"
  - "Trick"
  - "Crisis"
  - "Twilight"
  - "Familiar Objects"
  - "Fingers"
  - "Plausible"
  - "Lucid"
  - "Virgins"
  - "Twins"
  - "Indirect Path"
  - "The Bottle"
  - "The Hydrangea"
  - "A Dream Explained"
  - "The Manuscript"
  - "The Belt Sander"
  - "Film Star's Dog"
  - "Justice"
  - "Encounter"
  - "The Letters"
  - "Ex-Car"
  - "Almost"
  - "Treasure"
  - "The Bureau"
  - "The Cement Mailbox"
  - "Trust Jesus"
  - "Kevin"
  - "Terrorist"
  - "Directions"
  - "Distance"
  - "Sixty Dollars"
  - "The Pork Chop"
  - "Tool"
  - "Last Meal"
  - "Too Well"
  - "The Expert"
  - "The Uniform"
  - "Master"
  - "Money Isn't Everything"
  - "Lost"
  - "Wake"
  - "Expecting"
  - "The Mothers"
  - "The Fathers"
  - "Sons"
  - "Different"
  - "The Denim Touch"
  - "Mice"
  - "Tea"
  - "Deaf Child Area"
  - "The Branch"
  - "Kiss"
  - "Coupon"
  - "The Obelisk of Interlaken"
  - "The Nuns"
  - "Short"
  - "Conceptual"
  - "Two Professors"
  - "The Hollow Door"
  - "Impostor"
  - "Mikeworld"
  - "Meteorite"
  - "Lefties"
  - "Scene"
  - "Monkeys"
  - "The Names"
  - "Crackpots"
  - "New Dead"
  - "Koan"
  - "Shelter"
  - "Big Idea"
  - "Live Rock Nightly"
  - "Intact"
  - "Spell"
  - "The Mad Folder"
  - "Sickness"
  - "Unlikely"
  - "Smoke"
  - "Flowers"
  - "Heirloom"
  - "Brevity"
- The Great Zombini (2011). Contain 21 short stories
- See You in Paradise: Stories (Graywolf Press, 2014). Contain 14 short stories:
  - "Portal" (2011)
  - "No Life" (2010)
  - "See You in Paradise"
  - "Hibachi" (2010)
  - "Zombie Dan" (2007)
  - "A Stormy Evening at the Buck Snort Restaurant"
  - "The Wraith" (2008)
  - "The Accursed Items" (2000)
  - "Weber’s Head" (2010)
  - "Ecstasy" (2004)
  - "Total Humiliation in 1987" (2011)
  - "Flight" (1999)
  - "The Future Journal" (2000)
  - "Farewell, Bounder"
- Let Me Think (2021)

=== Short stories ===
Uncollected short stories.

- "The Rememberer" (2008)
