= Stav Sherez =

British novelist (born 1970)

Stav Sherez (born 1970) is a British novelist whose first novel, The Devil's Playground, was published in 2004 by Penguin Books and was shortlisted for the CWA John Creasey Dagger. In July 2018 he won the Theakston's Old Peculier Crime Novel of the Year Award for his fifth novel, The Intrusions, the third outing for his detectives Jack Carrigan and Geneva Miller.

== Biography ==
Born in 1970, Sherez grew up in London and attended Latymer Upper School and the University of Leeds. Sherez's second novel, The Black Monastery, was published by Faber & Faber in April 2009. From 1999 to 2004 he was a main contributor to the music magazine Comes with a Smile. From December 2006 he has been literary editor of the Catholic Herald.

== Bibliography ==
=== Novels ===
- The Devil's Playground 2004 (Penguin) – Shortlisted for the CWA John Creasey Best First Novel Award
- The Black Monastery 2009 (Faber & Faber)
- A Dark Redemption 2012 (Faber & Faber) – Shortlisted for the Theakston's Old Peculier Crime Novel of the Year Award 2013
- Eleven Days 2013 (Faber & Faber) – Shortlisted for the Theakston's Old Peculier Crime Novel of the Year Award 2014
- The Intrusions 2017 (Faber & Faber) – Winner of the Theakston's Old Peculier Crime Novel of the Year Award 2018

=== Short stories ===
- "God Box", published in Perverted by Language: Fiction Inspired by the Fall, Serpent's Tail 2007
- "Hotel Room", published in The Flash, Social Disease 2007
