= Lanny Joon =

American actor

- Occupation: Actor
- Years active: 2007–present

Lanny Joon is a Korean-American actor known for his roles in films Takers (2010), Black Gold (2011), West 32nd (2007), and Baby Driver (2017). He has appeared in single episodes of several TV series.

In West 32nd (2007) by Michael Kang, he stars alongside John Cho, Grace Park, and Jun-seong Kim. He played the role of JD in Baby Driver (2017), opposite Jamie Foxx and Ansel Elgort. Joon also stars as the protagonist John in Ktown Cowboys (2010), directed by Daniel DPD Park, which won Best Feature Film at the Los Angeles Asian Pacific Film Festival.

He has also appeared in one episode of multiple TV shows, such as: Castle, The Big Bang Theory, Wizards of Waverly Place, in J. J. Abrams' Undercovers, The Forgotten, Numb3rs, CSI: Crime Scene Investigation, Hawaii Five-0 and more.

Joon is a graduate of New York University (NYU), where he majored in Broadcast Journalism and Theater.

== Filmography ==
=== Film ===
Year	Title	Role	Notes
2007	West 32nd	Saeng	
2009	Boom	Director	Short
2009	Alvin and the Chipmunks: The Squeakquel	Paramedic	
2009	The Letter	Adam	Short
2010	Takers	Vice Cop	
2010	Bathroom Battle Royale	Luke	Short
2011	The Charles Kim Show	Danny / David	Short
2011	Black Gold	Agent Cole	
2011	Two for Hollywood	Man At The Bar	Short
2012	Black November	Agent Cole	
2013	About Abigail	Patrick	
2014	Lucky Bastard	Nico	
2017	Baby Driver	J.D.	
2022	O9en Up	Travis	

=== Television ===
Year	Title	Role	Notes
2008	Lost	Dr. Bae	Episode: "Ji Yeon"
2008	CSI: Crime Scene Investigation	Jin Ming / Mr. Pan	Episode: "Say Uncle"
2009	Numbers	Colin Ping	Episode: "Trouble in Chinatown"
2010	The Forgotten	Asian Cop	Episode: "Living Doe"
2010	Ktown Cowboys	John	
2010	Undercovers	French Translator	Episode: "Not Without My Daughter"
2010–2015	Hollywood Wasteland	Roy Jones	Recurring
2011	Wizards of Waverly Place	Sensei	Episode: "Daddy's Little Girl"
2011	The Big Bang Theory	Officer Shin	Episode: "The Zarnecki Incursion"
2011	Castle	Philip Lee	Episode: "Kick the Ballistics"
2013	NCIS: Los Angeles	Ryan Cheng	Episode: "The Livelong Day"
2014	Recorded Lives	Derek	Guest
2016	Lucifer	Yellow Viper	Episode: "Sweet Kicks"
2017	NCIS	Edward Jin Tao	Episode: "Willoughby"
2018	Chicago Fire	CFD Affairs Officer Kim	Episode: "What Will Define You"
2018	Hawaii Five-0	Brando Kenzo	Episode: "Ka hopu nui 'ana"
2018	S.W.A.T	Billy Gunn	Episode: "K-Town"
2019	Bulge Bracket	Jackson	All episodes; six 10-minute episodes
2019	Magnum P.I.	Tony Zhao	Episode: “The Man in the Secret Room“
2020	Prodigal Son	Cooper	Episode: "The Job"
2023	Wolf Pack	Jason Jang	Recurring role

=== Video games ===
Year	Title	Role	Notes
2026	Call of Duty: Modern Warfare 4	Ko Jin-Hyuk	Voice and motion capture
