= Matthew Greenfield =

American film producer

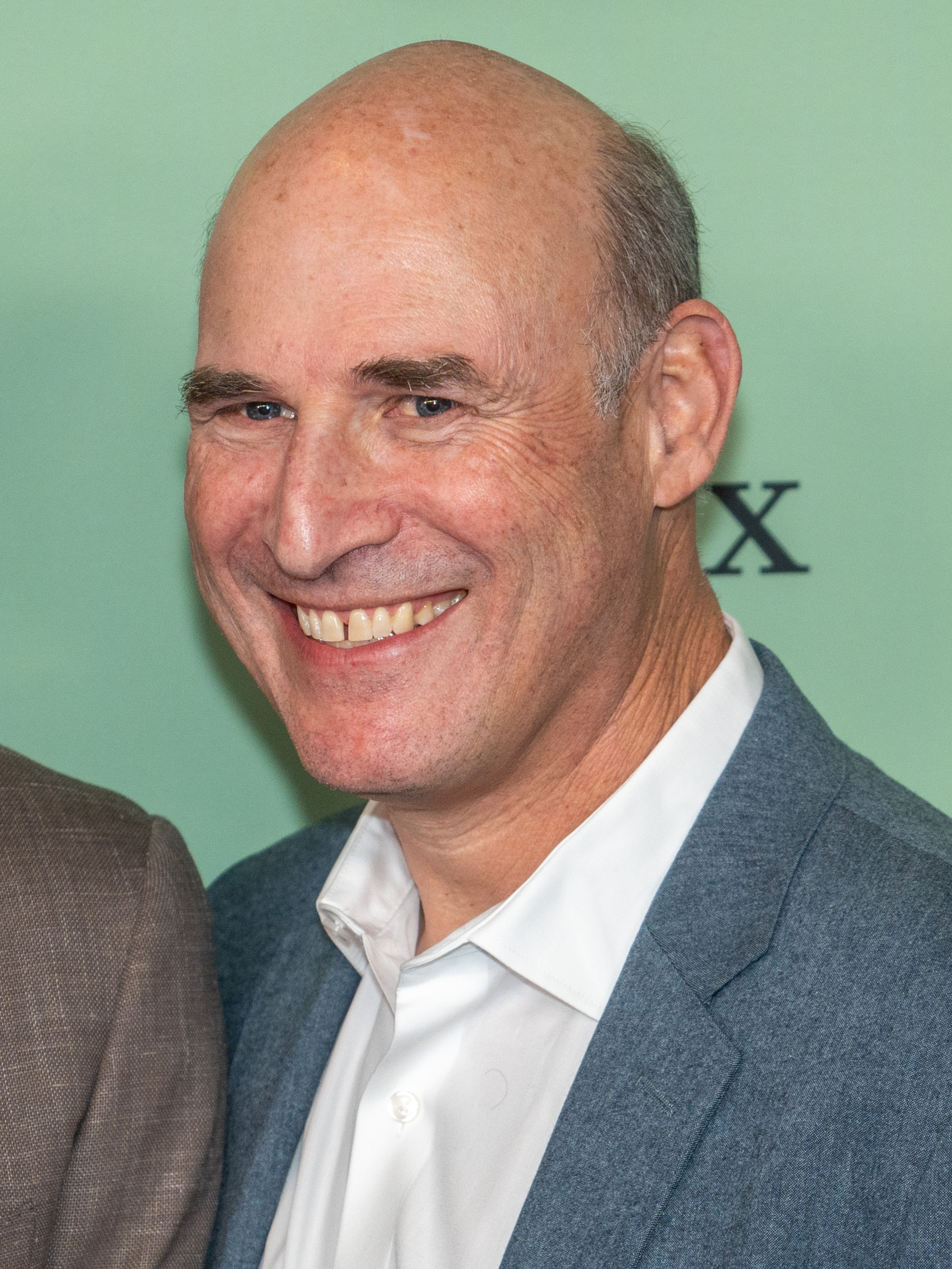
- Greenfield in 2025
- Born: Boston, Massachusetts, U.S.
- Education: Wesleyan University
- Occupation: Executive
- Spouse: Laurence Dumortier
- Parent: Patricia Marks Greenfield
- Relatives: Lauren Greenfield (sister)

Matthew Greenfield is the president of Searchlight Pictures, which has produced five Academy Awards for Best Picture winners, including Slumdog Millionaire, Birdman, 12 Years a Slave, The Shape of Water, and Nomadland. Greenfield and fellow Searchlight president David Greenbaum started Searchlight Television in 2018.

He joined Searchlight after his tenure as Associate Director of the Feature Film Program at the Sundance Institute.

Prior to his work at Sundance, Greenfield worked as an independent producer, producing Star Maps, Chuck & Buck, and The Good Girl, all directed by Miguel Arteta, and the latter two written by Mike White. As the producer of Chuck & Buck, Greenfield won the Independent Spirit John Cassavetes Award. He's also the producer of The Motel, written and directed by Michael Kang.

He co-founded the boutique publishing company Cloverfield Press with Laurence Dumortier. Greenfield studied film at Crossroads School with Jim Hosney, and at Wesleyan University with Jeanine Basinger. He lives in Los Angeles, California with his wife and two children.
