= Miguel Arteta =

Puerto Rican film director

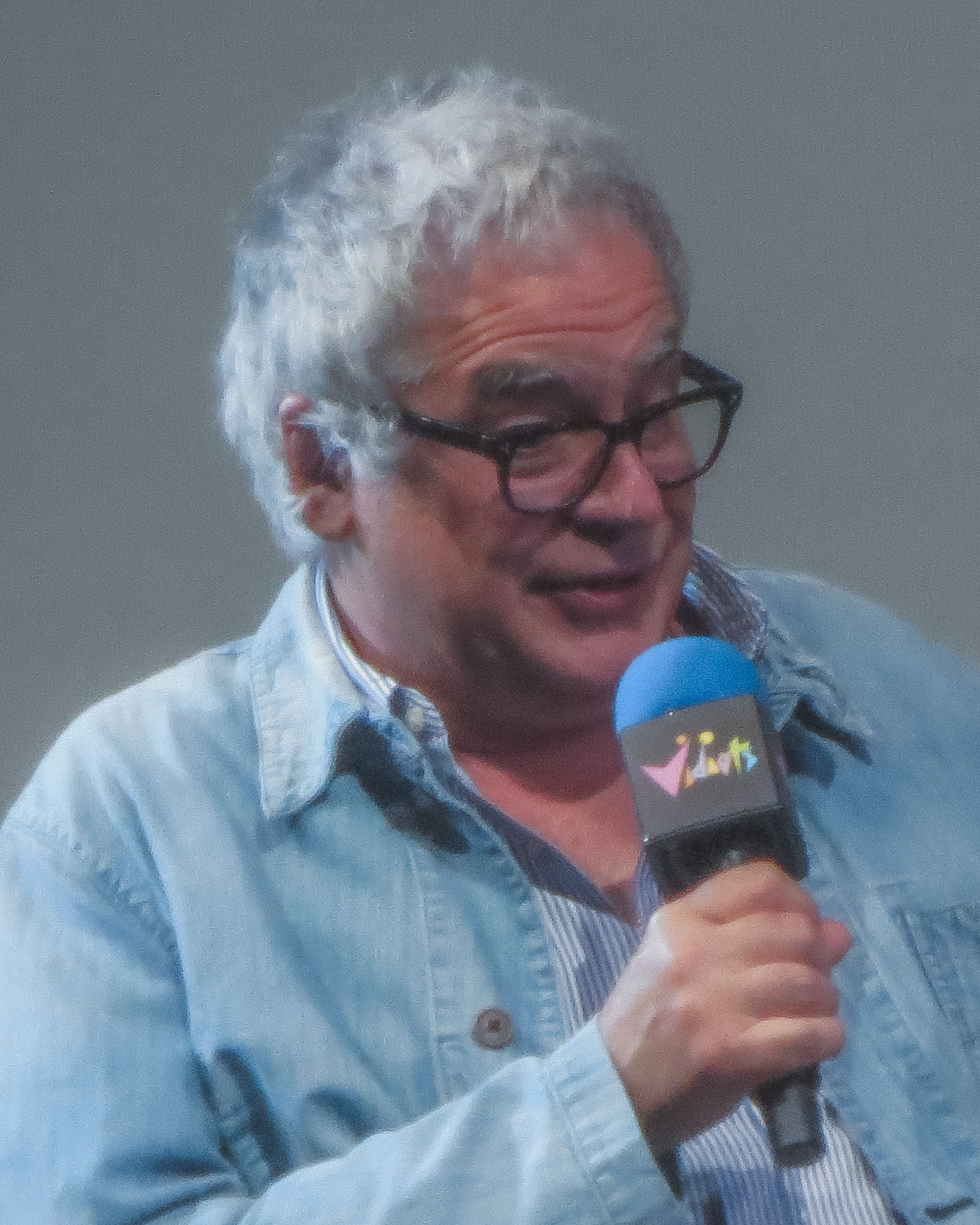
- Arteta in 2025
- Born: August 29, 1965 (age 61); San Juan, Puerto Rico
- Education: Harvard University; Wesleyan University (BA); American Film Institute (MFA)
- Occupation: Director
- Years active: 1990-present

Miguel Arteta (born August 29, 1965) is a Puerto Rican filmmaker known for his work in independent cinema and television. His film Chuck & Buck (2000) received the Independent Spirit Award for Best Feature made for under $500,000, while The Good Girl (2002) premiered at the Sundance Film Festival and was met with positive critical reception. In television, Arteta has directed episodes for series such as The Office, Succession, and Enlightened. His work on Succession earned him a Directors Guild of America Award nomination.

== Early life ==
Born in San Juan, Puerto Rico, to a Peruvian father and Spanish mother, Arteta grew up across Latin America due to his father's job as a Chrysler auto parts salesman. He went to high school in Costa Rica but was expelled, and went to live with his sister in Boston, Massachusetts, graduating from The Cambridge School of Weston in Massachusetts. He then attended Harvard University's documentary program where he learned filmmaking. He eventually left for Wesleyan University, where he met future collaborators Matthew Greenfield and Mike White.

After graduating in 1989, his student film Every Day is a Beautiful Day won a Student Academy Award, which got him a job as a second assistant camera to Jonathan Demme on the documentary Cousin Bobby. Demme then recommended him to the AFI Conservatory, and Arteta received his MFA there in 1993.

== Career ==
Arteta's first film, Star Maps, is a dark tale of a Mexican teenage boy and aspiring actor who is pimped by his father as a male prostitute in Los Angeles. It debuted at the Sundance Film Festival. It was a critical hit, receiving five Independent Spirit Award nominations, including Best First Feature and Best First Screenplay. He then turned to directing television shows, helming episodes of Homicide: Life on the Street, Freaks and Geeks, and Six Feet Under. He has also since directed episodes of The Office, Ugly Betty, and American Horror Story.

Arteta achieved critical acclaim and won a 2001 Independent Spirit Award for Best Feature Under $500,000 for Chuck & Buck, which teamed him with his fellow Wesleyan alumni Greenfield (film producer) and White (screenwriter and star). It is a story of male friendship and homoerotic desire, featuring a 27-year-old man who tracks down his former best friend and stalks him, hoping to re-enact their childhood sex games. The trio worked together once more on 2002's The Good Girl, starring Jennifer Aniston, a retelling of Flaubert's Madame Bovary set in the American Midwest.

Arteta's Youth in Revolt, a comedy starring Michael Cera, was released in 2010. Arteta's Cedar Rapids, starring Ed Helms and produced by Alexander Payne, was released in 2011. Most recently he reunited with White and directed four episodes of White's HBO series Enlightened.

Arteta re-teamed with Mike White on Beatriz at Dinner, which starred Salma Hayek and John Lithgow. It had its world premiere at the Sundance Film Festival in January 2017, and was released in June 2017, by Roadside Attractions. Arteta next directed Duck Butter, which he co-wrote alongside Alia Shawkat who starred in the film alongside Laia Costa, the film was shot over the course of nine days with the majority being shot over the course of 24 hours. It had its world premiere at the Tribeca Film Festival on April 20, 2018. and was released on April 27, 2018. The film received mixed reviews from film critics.

In 2020, Arteta directed Like a Boss, starring Tiffany Haddish, Rose Byrne and re-teaming with Hayek, which was released on January 10 by Paramount Pictures. He directed Yes Day, starring Jennifer Garner and Jenna Ortega for Netflix.

== Filmography ==
=== Film ===
Year	Title	Director	Writer	Executive Producer
1997	Star Maps	Yes	Yes	No
2000	Chuck & Buck	Yes	No	No
2002	The Good Girl	Yes	No	No
2009	Youth in Revolt	Yes	No	No
2009	Chinatown Film Project	Yes	No	No
2011	Cedar Rapids	Yes	No	No
2014	Alexander and the Terrible, Horrible, No Good, Very Bad Day	Yes	No	No
2017	Beatriz at Dinner	Yes	No	No
2018	Duck Butter	Yes	Yes	Yes
2020	Like a Boss	Yes	No	No
2021	Yes Day	Yes	No	Yes

Producer

- The Motel (2005)

Actor

Year	Title	Role
2004	See This Movie	Festival Panelist
2004	In Good Company	Globecome Technician
2009	Youth in Revolt	Illegal Immigrant #2
2015	Digging for Fire	Bartender

=== Short film ===
Year	Title	Director	Writer
1998	Livin' Thing	Yes	Yes
2005	Are You the Favorite Person of Anybody?	Yes	No

Executive Producer

- Tess and Nana (2008)

=== Television ===
Year	Title	Director	Executive Producer	Episode(s)
1999	Homicide: Life on the Street	Yes	No	"Zen and the Art of Murder"
1999	Snoops	Yes	No	"True Believers"
2000	Freaks and Geeks	Yes	No	"Chokin' and Tokin'"
2000	Time of Your Life	Yes	No	"The Time She Made a Temporary Decision"
2004	Cracking Up	Yes	No	"Birds Do It"
2001–2004	Six Feet Under	Yes	No	"The Will" "The Liar and the Whore" "Terror Starts at Home"
2006	The Office	Yes	No	"Diwali"
2007	Ugly Betty	Yes	No	"Punch Out"
2009	We Are the Mods	No	Yes	
2011	The Big C	Yes	No	"Sexual Healing" "Boo"
2011	How to Make It in America	Yes	No	"Mofongo"
2011	New Girl	Yes	No	"Thanksgiving"
2011	American Horror Story	Yes	No	"Rubber Man"
2011	Enlightened	Yes	Co-executive	"Now or Never" "Someone Else's Life" "Comrades Unite!" "Burn It Down"
2012	House of Lies	Yes	No	"Bareback Town"
2012	Nurse Jackie	Yes	No	"Day of the Iguana" "Chaud & Froid"
2012	The New Normal	Yes	No	"Nanagasm" "The Godparent Trap"
2013	The Carrie Diaries	Yes	Yes	"Pilot"
2013–15	Getting On	Yes	Yes	"Born on the Fourth of July" "No Such Thing as Idealized Genitalia" "Is Soap a Hazardous Substance?" "This Is About Vomit, People." "Don't Let It Get in You or On You" "No, I Don't Want a Fucking Smiley Face" "Am I Still Me?" "Please Partake of a Memorial Orange" "Reduced to Eating Boiled Magazines and Book Paste"
2015	Grace & Frankie	Yes	No	"The Elevator"
2017	Famous in Love	Yes	No	"Pilot"
2018	Succession	Yes	No	"Austerlitz"
2018	Forever	Yes	No	"Another Place" "Oceanside"
2019	Room 104	Yes	No	"No Hospital" (Also writer)
2021, 2025	The Morning Show	Yes	No	"Testimony" "Person of Interest" "The Parent Trap"
2022	Florida Man	Yes	Yes	"Episode #1.1" "Episode #"1.2"
2025	Poker Face	Yes	No	"Whack-A-Mole"

TV movies

- Criminology 101 (2003)
- Rita (2013) (Also executive producer)

Actor

Year	Title	Role	Episode
2013	Enlightened	Flender Fan in Bar	"Follow Me"

== Awards and nominations ==
Title	Year	Association / Category	Results	Ref
Star Maps	1997	Mar del Plata Film Festival for Best Film — International Competition	Nominated	
Star Maps	1998	ALMA Award for Outstanding Latino Director of a Feature Film	Nominated	
Star Maps	1998	Independent Spirit Award for Best Feature Film (shared with Matthew Greenfield)	Nominated	
Star Maps	1998	Independent Spirit Award for Best First Screenplay	Nominated	
Time of Your Life	2001	ALMA Award for Outstanding Director of a Drama Series	Nominated	
Freaks and Geeks	2001	ALMA Award for Outstanding Director of a Comedy Series	Nominated	
Chuck & Buck	2000	Deauville Film Festival for Grand Prize Award	Nominated	
Chuck & Buck	2000	Gijon International Film Festival for Best Feature	Nominated	
Chuck & Buck	2000	Sundance Film Festival for Grand Jury Prize — Drama	Nominated	
Chuck & Buck	2001	ALMA Award for Outstanding Director of a Feature Film	Nominated	
Chuck & Buck	2001	Independent Spirit Award for Best Feature Film — Under $500,000 (shared with Mike White & Matthew Greenfield)	Won	
Chuck & Buck	2001	Independent Spirit Award for Best Director	Nominated	
The Good Girl	2002	Deauville Film Festival for Grand Prize Award	Nominated	
The Good Girl	2002	Gijon International Film Festival for Best Feature	Nominated	
Six Feet Under	2002	OFTA Television Award for Best Direction in a Drama	Nominated	
The Motel	2007	Independent Spirit Award for Best First Feature (shared with Michael Kang / Matthew Greenfield / Gian Kwon / Karin Chien)	Nominated	
Youth in Revolt	2009	Deauville Film Festival for Grand Prize Award	Nominated	
How to Make It in America	2012	NAACP Image Award for Outstanding Directing in a Comedy Series ("Mofongo")	Nominated	
Alexander and the Terrible, Horrible, No Good, Very Bad Day	2014	Heartland Film Award for Truly Moving Picture Award	Won	
Beatriz at Dinner	2017	Imagen Foundation Award for Best Director	Won	
Duck Butter	2018	Tribeca Film Festival for Best Narrative Feature	Nominated	
Room 104	2020	Imagen Foundation Award for Best Director — Television	Nominated	
