= Late Autumn =

Late Autumn may refer to:

- Dry season
- Late Autumn (秋日和, Akibiyori, lit. "A Calm Autumn Day")
  - Late Autumn (1960 film), a Japanese drama film by Yasujirō Ozu
- Late Autumn (만추, 晩秋)
  - Late Autumn (1966 film), a Korean film starring Shin Seong-il
  - Late Autumn (1982 film), a Korean film starring Kim Hye-ja
  - Late Autumn (2010 film), a Korean film starring Tang Wei and Hyun Bin
