= 16th Independent Spirit Awards =

US film awards ceremony in 2001

- Date: March 24, 2001
- Site: Santa Monica, California, U.S.
- Hosted by: John Waters

Highlights
- Best Film: Crouching Tiger, Hidden Dragon
- Most awards: Crouching Tiger, Hidden Dragon (3)
- Most nominations: Requiem for a Dream (5); Chuck & Buck (5); You Can Count on Me (5)

The 16th Independent Spirit Awards, honoring the best in independent filmmaking for 2000, were announced on March 24, 2001. It was hosted by John Waters.

== Winners and nominees ==
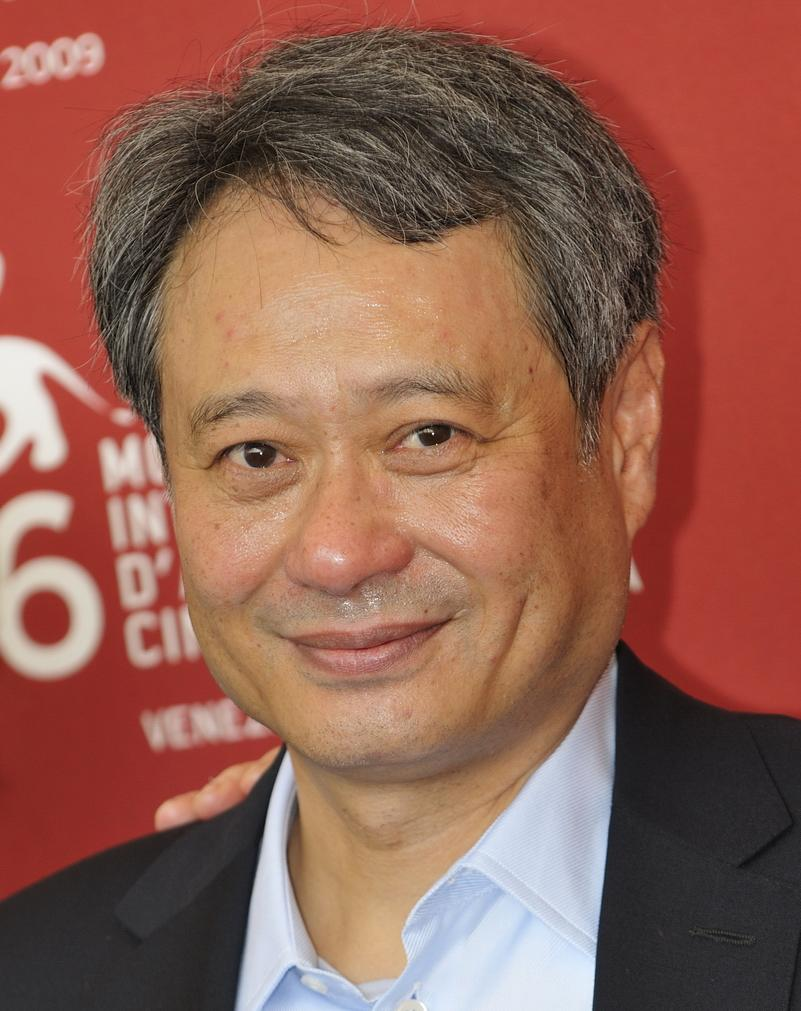
Ang Lee, Best Director winner

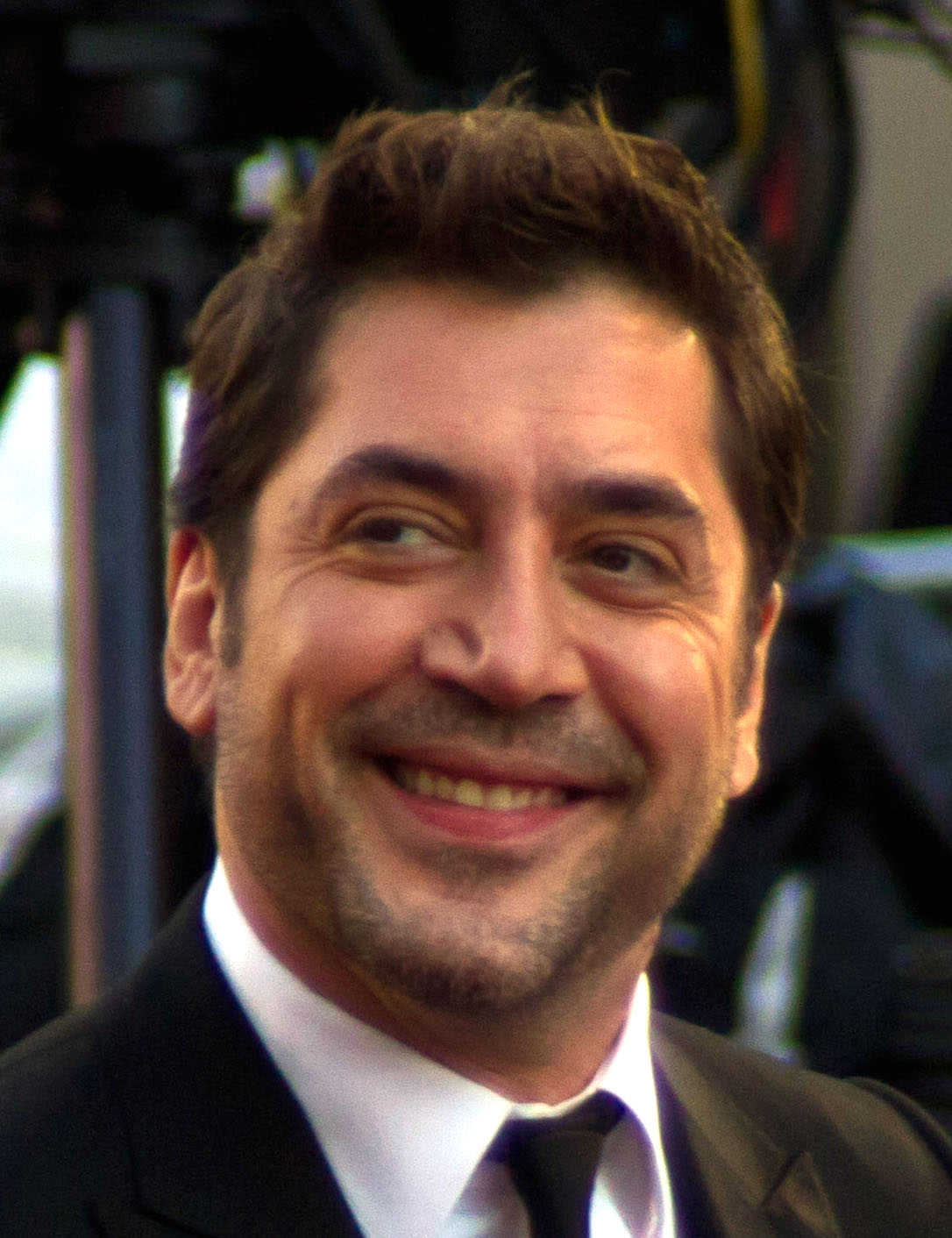
Javier Bardem, Best Male Lead winner

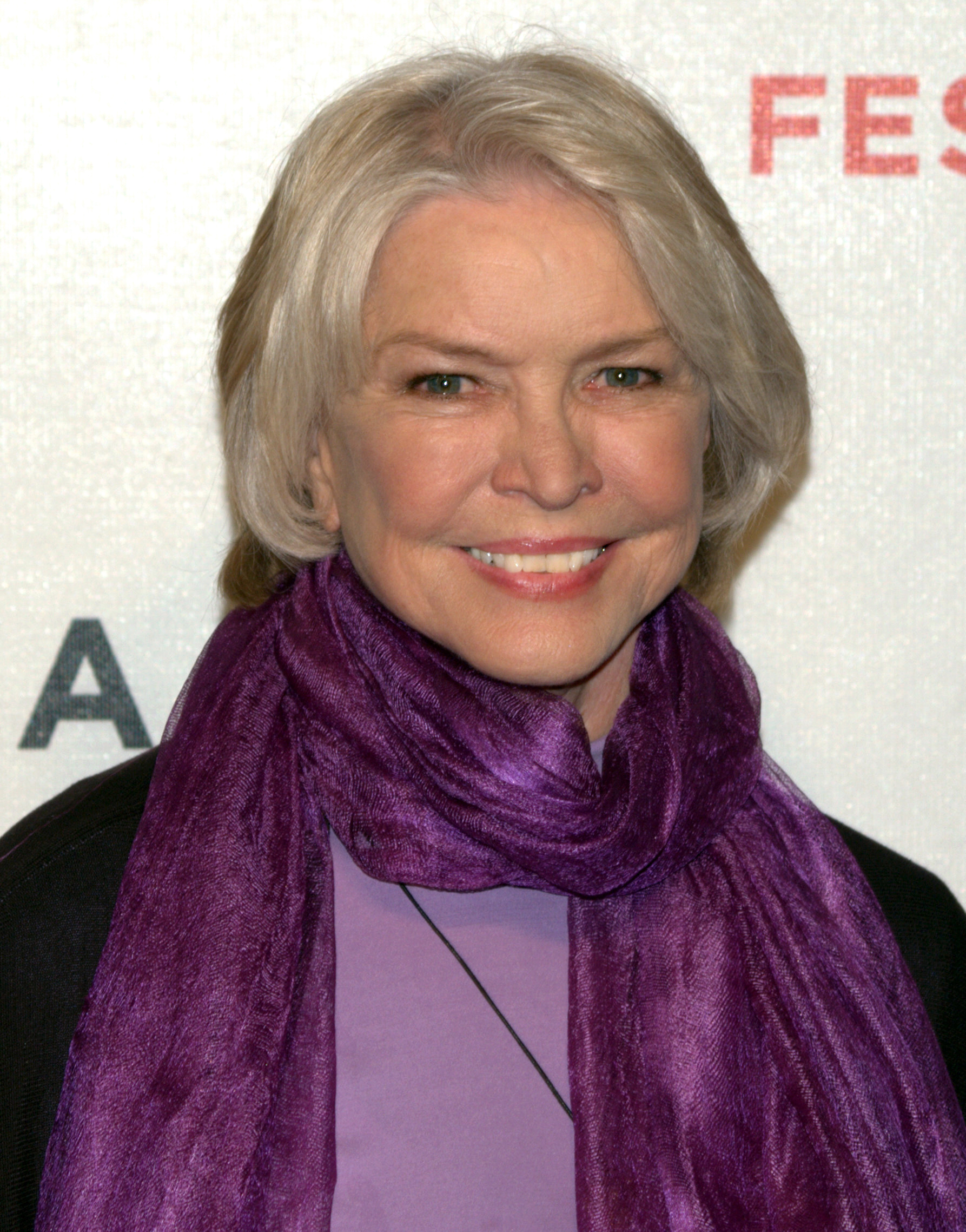
Ellen Burstyn, Best Female Lead winner

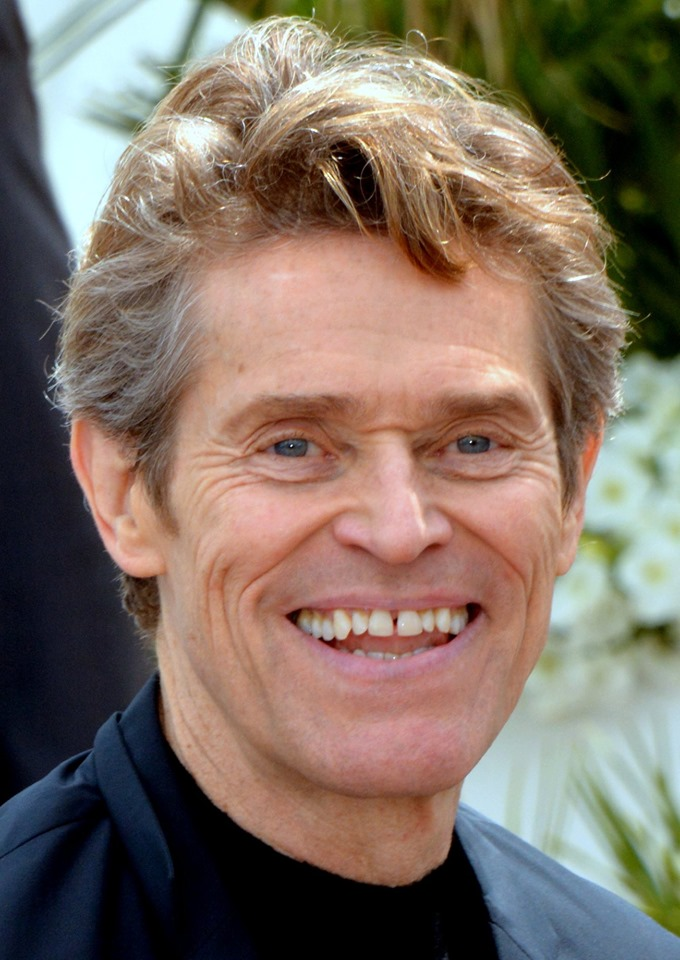
Willem Dafoe, Best Supporting Male winner

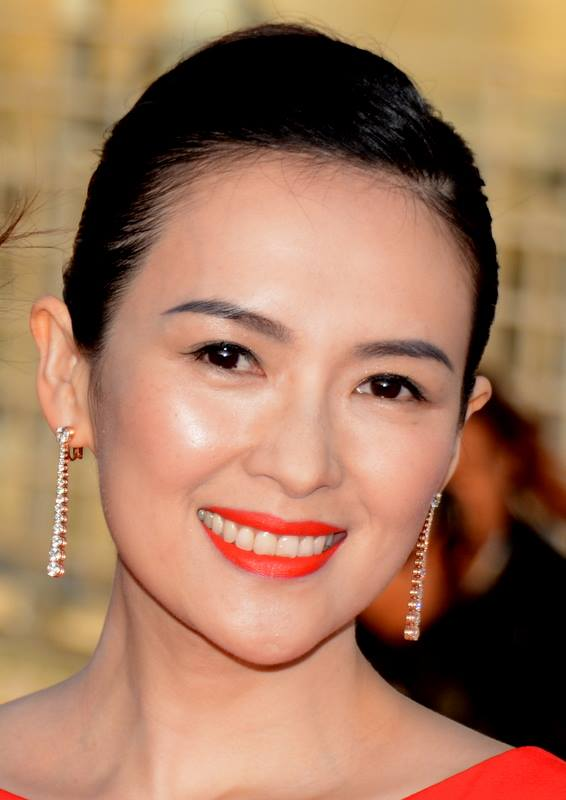
Zhang Ziyi, Best Supporting Female winner

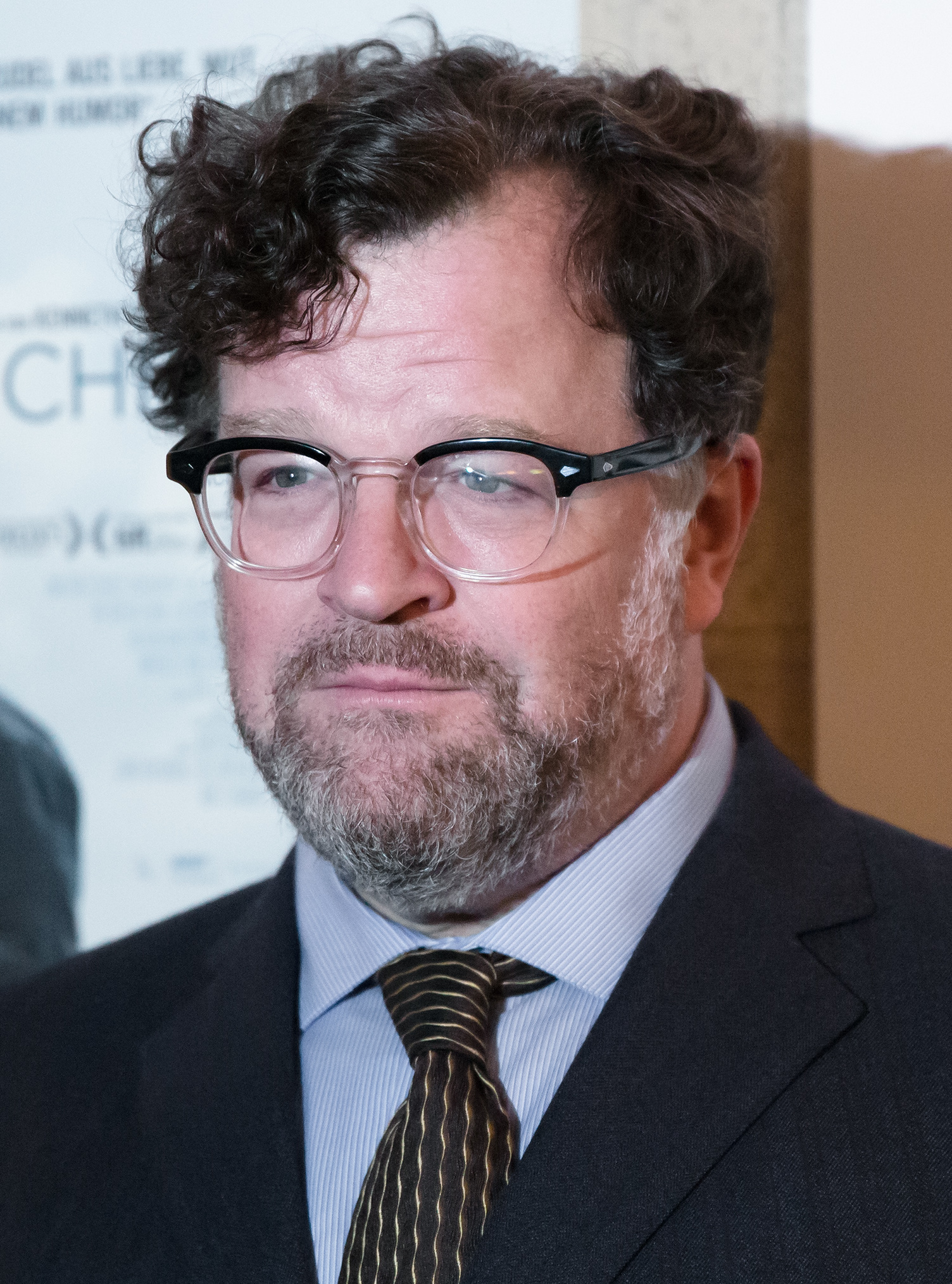
Kenneth Lonergan, Best Screenplay winner

| Best Feature | Best Director |
|---|---|
| Crouching Tiger, Hidden Dragon: Before Night Falls; George Washington; Ghost Dog: The Way of the Samurai; Requiem for a Dream | Ang Lee – Crouching Tiger, Hidden Dragon: Darren Aronofsky – Requiem for a Dream; Miguel Arteta – Chuck & Buck; Christopher Guest – Best in Show; Julian Schnabel – Before Night Falls |
| Best Male Lead | Best Female Lead |
| Javier Bardem – Before Night Falls: Adrien Brody – Restaurant; Billy Crudup – Jesus’ Son; Hill Harper – The Visit; Mark Ruffalo – You Can Count on Me | Ellen Burstyn – Requiem for a Dream: Joan Allen – The Contender; Sanaa Lathan – Love & Basketball; Laura Linney – You Can Count on Me; Kelly Macdonald – Two Family House |
| Best Supporting Male | Best Supporting Female |
| Willem Dafoe – Shadow of the Vampire: Cole Hauser – Tigerland; Gary Oldman – The Contender; Giovanni Ribisi – The Gift; Billy Dee Williams – The Visit | Zhang Ziyi – Crouching Tiger, Hidden Dragon: Pat Caroll – Songcatcher; Jennifer Connelly – Requiem for a Dream; Marcia Gay Harden – Pollock; Lupe Ontiveros – Chuck & Buck |
| Best Screenplay | Best First Screenplay |
| You Can Count on Me – Kenneth Lonergan: Chuck & Buck – Mike White; Love & Sex – Valerie Breiman; Two Family House – Raymond De Felitta; Waking the Dead – Robert Dillon | Love & Basketball – Gina Prince-Bythewood: Boiler Room – Ben Younger; George Washington – David Gordon Green; Tigerland – Ross Klavan and Michael McGruther; The Visit – Jordan Walker-Pearlman |
| Best First Feature | Best Debut Performance |
| You Can Count on Me: Boiler Room; Girlfight; Love & Basketball; The Visit | Michelle Rodriguez – Girlfight: Curtis Cotton III, Candace Evanofski, Rachael Handy, Donald Holden and Damian Jewan Lee – George Washington; Rory Culkin – You Can Count on Me; Emmy Rossum – Songcatcher; Mike White – Chuck & Buck |
| Best Cinematography | Best Documentary |
| Requiem for a Dream – Matthew Libatique: Before Night Falls – Xavier Pérez Grobet and Guillermo Rosas; George Washington – Tim Orr; Hamlet – John de Borman; Shadow of the Vampire – Lou Bogue | Dark Days: The Eyes of Tammy Faye; Long Night's Journey into Day; Paragraph 175; Sound and Fury |
Best International Film
Dancer in the Dark • Denmark: In the Mood for Love • Hong Kong/France; Malli • India; A Time for Drunken Horses • Iran; The War Zone • UK

== Special awards ==
John Cassavetes Award

Chuck & Buck

- Bunny
- Everything Put Together
- Groove
- Our Song

Truer Than Fiction Award

Keep the River on Your Right: A Modern Cannibal Tale

- Benjamin Smoke
- Just, Melvin: Just Evil
- Pie in the Sky: The Brigid Berlin Story

Producers Award

Paul Mezey – The Ballad of Ramblin’ Jack and Spring Forward

- Jim McKay – American Movie and Our Song
- Tim Perell – Louis & Frank and The Myth of Fingerprints
- Diana E. Williams – The Love Machine and Our Song

Someone to Watch Award

Marc Forster – Everything Put Together

- Dan McCormack – Other Voices
- Mia Trachinger – Bunny

== Films with multiple nominations and awards ==
Films that received multiple nominations
| Nominations | Film |
|---|---|
| 5 | Chuck & Buck |
| 5 | Requiem for a Dream |
| 5 | You Can Count on Me |
| 4 | Before Night Falls |
| 4 | George Washington |
| 3 | Crouching Tiger, Hidden Dragon |
| 3 | Love & Basketball |
| 2 | Girlfight |
| 2 | Songcatcher |

Films that won multiple awards
| Awards | Film |
|---|---|
| 3 | Crouching Tiger, Hidden Dragon |
| 2 | Requiem for a Dream |
| 2 | You Can Count on Me |
