= Year of the Dog (film) =

2007 film by Mike White

- Theatrical release poster
- Directed by: Mike White
- Written by: Mike White
- Produced by: Mike White; Ben LeClair; Dede Gardner
- Starring: Molly Shannon; Laura Dern; Regina King; Tom McCarthy; Josh Pais; John C. Reilly; Peter Sarsgaard
- Cinematography: Tim Orr
- Edited by: Dody Dorn
- Music by: Christophe Beck
- Production companies: Paramount Vantage; Rip Cord Productions; Plan B Entertainment
- Distributed by: Paramount Pictures
- Release dates: January 20, 2007 (Sundance); April 13, 2007 (United States)
- Running time: 97 minutes
- Country: United States
- Language: English
- Box office: $1.6 million

Year of the Dog is a 2007 American comedy-drama film written, co-produced, and directed by Mike White (in his directorial debut). It stars Molly Shannon as a happy-go-lucky woman whose life changes in unexpected ways after her beloved dog suddenly dies. Laura Dern, Regina King, Tom McCarthy, Josh Pais, John C. Reilly, and Peter Sarsgaard appear in supporting roles.

The film had its world premiere at the Sundance Film Festival on January 20, 2007, and was theatrically released in the United States on April 13, 2007, by Paramount Vantage. It grossed over $1.6 million and received positive reviews from critics. It won Best Feature Film at the 22nd Genesis Awards, while White was nominated for Best Screenplay at the 23rd Independent Spirit Awards.

== Plot ==
Peggy is a 40-something administrative assistant with no social or love life. She is closest to her dog, Pencil. Late one evening he refuses to come in, so a sleepy Peggy leaves him out overnight. The next morning she finds him in her neighbor Al's yard, whimpering in pain. The vet can't save him and he ultimately dies of poisoning.

People in Peggy's life are sympathetic but most don't understand her grief. Best friend Layla tells her Pencil kept her from finding romance. Her emotionally sterile sister-in-law Bret and brother Pier are too self-absorbed to notice.

Peggy's neighbor, Al, asks her out. Starting out well, oblivious to Peggy's reaction, he shares that he shot his own dog while hunting then shows off his knife collection and hunting trophies. She asks to see his garage, seeking the poison that killed Pencil. Al makes a pass which Peggy rejects.

Peggy gets a call from Newt from the SPCA who was present when Pencil died as he has a dog for her to adopt: Valentine, a King Shepherd with behavioral problems. Newt agrees to help train him, and they begin to spend a lot of time together.

Through Newt, Peggy is exposed to veganism and animal rights. She becomes a vegan and begins helping him to get various animals adopted. Chastised by her boss Robin for her commitment, she retaliates by donating to various animal-related charities using a business checkbook and forging Robin's signature.

Peggy and Newt share a kiss, Newt declining to go any further, which she mistakes for chivalry. When she confesses her feelings he reveals that he is celibate and asexual. Peggy reacts badly, shutting Newt out and focusing on her new relationship with Valentine.

Valentine's sporadically violent behavior worsens without Newt's instruction. He bites Peggy and his continual barking causes Al to complain. She responds rudely, as she is sure something in his garage poisoned Pencil.

Peggy's animal rights interest deepens, particularly the prevention of animal testing and support of farms keeping animals out of slaughterhouses. Her new belief system is looked at flippantly by Pier and Bret; when she announces she is a vegan, he says it won't last long.

Over New Year's, Peggy babysits Pier's children, leaving Valentine with Newt. She takes Lissie and Benji to a rescued animal farm to introduce them to their "adopted" chicken (a charity sponsorship) she got them for Christmas. Intensely moved by the experience, Peggy wants to show them a slaughterhouse, but the children freak out.

Peggy gets drunk and, showing Lissie the rack of furs in her mother's closet, when she asks her opinion of them she says it's "mean". Peggy passes out and in the morning finds the furs ruined in the bathtub full of water. She goes to Newt's to get Valentine and finds him weeping. Valentine killed his crippled dog Buttons, so Newt had Valentine put down as he knew Peggy couldn't do it.

Rushing to the pound, Peggy is too late to save Valentine. She impulsively adopts 15 dogs slated to die, saying she works with the SPCA and will find them all homes. At work, Peggy is confronted by her boss, who has discovered the fraudulent checks and fires her.

Peggy's life falls apart, she barely leaves home, which is practically destroyed by the dogs. Al complains, saying if she does not control them he will. While she is out, Newt confiscates the dogs and leaves a warning notice from the SPCA.

Erroneously blaming Al, Peggy sneaks into his house and finds molluscicide with a hole chewed into the corner, confirming her suspicions about Pencil's death. Zombie-like, she drags the bag through the house, leaking poison pellets everywhere. She takes one of Al's hunting knives and hides. When he and his girlfriend return home, Peggy attacks them with the knife. Al wrestles it away from her and calls the police.

Pier and Bret try to help. Peggy's boss will rehire her if she pays back everything and goes to counseling. When they ask why Peggy attacked Al, she says she wanted him to experience being hunted.

Peggy returns to work and is greeted warmly. But an internet search soon leads her to an upcoming animal rights protest. Sending an email to her coworkers, boss, Newt, Pier, and Bret, she says she must follow her soul. She abandons her former life, heading off to the protest, content that fighting for animals is her greater reason for living (not child-rearing, career, or intimate human relationships).

== Cast ==
- Molly Shannon as Peggy Spade
- Laura Dern as Bret Spade
- Regina King as Layla
- Thomas McCarthy as Pier Spade
- Josh Pais as Robin
- John C. Reilly as Al
- Peter Sarsgaard as Newt
- Amy Schlagel and Zoe Schlagel as Lissie
- Dale Godboldo as Don
- Inara George as Holly
- Liza Weil as Trishelle

== Production ==
Mike White described his experience making his directorial debut as "super-enjoyable," and said, "I had a lot of anticipatory dread, but when we were in the doing of it, it was actually just kinda fun." He conceived the film after having an unexpected emotional reaction to the death of his pet cat, and also wrote the screenplay especially for Shannon following their work together on the White-created 2004 sitcom Cracking Up.

== Reception ==
=== Box office ===
Year of the Dog grossed $1,540,141 in the United States and Canada, and $66,096 in other territories, for a worldwide total of $1,606,237.

=== Critical response ===
On the review aggregator website Rotten Tomatoes, 70% of 143 critics' reviews are positive. The website's consensus reads: "Year of the Dog is a warm and quirky comedy that never condescends to its eccentric characters." Metacritic, which uses a weighted average, assigned the film a score of 70 out of 100, based on 31 critics, indicating "generally favorable" reviews.

Associated Press film critic David Germain named the film the #10 best film of 2007. Manohla Dargis of The New York Times stated, "It's funny ha-ha but firmly in touch with its downer side, which means it's also funny in a kind of existential way." Duane Byrge of The Hollywood Reporter wrote, "Year of the Dog ambles with both light humor and dark insights. Filmmaker Mike White's easy comic touch graces the storyline, unleashing some amusing comic characters, as well." John Anderson of Variety remarked, "Year of the Dog is not a conventional comedy; both are fatalistically funny and resigned to the concept of unhappiness but generous enough to accept whatever a character may need to do to avoid it." However, Peter Bradshaw of The Guardian gave the film 2 out of 5 stars and commented, "White doesn't seem sure exactly where to take his script, how to find redemption for Peggy, or how to modify the tone."
