= The Good Girl =

2002 American comedy-drama film

- Theatrical release poster
- Directed by: Miguel Arteta
- Written by: Mike White
- Produced by: Matthew Greenfield
- Starring: Jennifer Aniston; John C. Reilly; Jake Gyllenhaal; Tim Blake Nelson; Zooey Deschanel; Mike White
- Cinematography: Enrique Chediak
- Edited by: Jeff Betancourt
- Music by: Tony Maxwell; James O'Brien; Mark Orton; Joey Waronker
- Production companies: Myriad Pictures; Flan de Coco Films
- Distributed by: Fox Searchlight Pictures
- Release dates: January 12, 2002 (Sundance); August 7, 2002 (United States)
- Running time: 93 minutes
- Country: United States
- Language: English
- Budget: $8 million
- Box office: $16.9 million

The Good Girl is a 2002 American comedy-drama film directed by Miguel Arteta and starring Jennifer Aniston, Jake Gyllenhaal and John C. Reilly.

The Good Girl premiered at the 2002 Sundance Film Festival, and released to theatres on August 7, 2002, in the United States by Fox Searchlight Pictures.

== Plot ==
Justine Last is a bored 30-year-old woman living in small-town Texas with her husband Phil, a house painter who spends most of his free time smoking marijuana with his best friend, Bubba. Phil and Justine have been trying to have a baby, but have been unsuccessful despite doctors telling Justine she is healthy and fertile.

Justine works at Retail Rodeo, the local big-box store. She meets the new cashier, Holden, who spends his free time reading The Catcher in the Rye as he identifies strongly with the protagonist. Justine and Holden begin spending time together and grow closer, but she is hesitant to begin an affair. Holden writes Justine a romantic letter expressing his love for her and his desire for her, and they have sex at a motel. They continue to meet there, charging the rooms to Justine's credit card, and also begin having sex in the store room at work.

Holden shares stories he's written with Justine, most of them reflecting his own feelings and alienation and all ending with the main character dying by suicide. Justine feels happy and excited by the affair and Holden's affection, but becomes concerned when she spots Bubba's truck parked across the street from the motel where they've been meeting. She tries to end the relationship, but Holden refuses and she begins to feel smothered by his passionate feelings.

Bubba confronts Justine about her affair with Holden and tells her he had always admired Phil, but now is disillusioned and sees him as only a cuckold and a fool. He blackmails Justine into having sex with him so he can be free of these feelings. She reluctantly consents, and Holden witnesses them in the act through a window.

Holden is angry and upset with Justine for sleeping with Bubba and calls her a whore. He begs Justine to run away with him. Justine, now desperate to end the affair, considers poisoning Holden but changes her mind suddenly and decides to speak to his parents instead. She tells them that he is mentally ill and has imagined a romantic liaison between them.

Justine discovers she's pregnant. Phil is overjoyed, but Justine is uneasy because she's uncertain of who the father is. Later, he hears from the doctor that he's sterile, but Bubba reassures him that they've made a mistake.

At the store, Justine is questioned by her boss, Jack, about $15,000 that has gone missing. They suspect Holden has stolen it, and Corny reveals that he's been watching her and Holden have sex in the store room on surveillance cameras. Justine insists she knows nothing about the theft, and tries to convince Holden to give up the money and surrender, but he still wants her to run away with him.

Justine considers running away with Holden, imagining what her life would be like if she stayed, and ultimately goes to Jack and tells him where to find Holden. The police surround the motel where Holden is hiding, and he kills himself.

The next day, Bubba tells Justine that Phil saw the motel room on the credit card statement, then begs her not to tell Phil about their encounter. Justine returns home and is confronted by Phil, who strikes her when she admits to her infidelity. Devastated, Phil expresses remorse for hitting her and asks if the baby is his. Justine assures him he is the father. Phil still insists on knowing who she had an affair with, and when he asks if it was with Corny the security guard, Justine lies and says yes. At work the next morning, Corny has a bruised face and his arm in a sling. Cheryl informs Justine that after Bible study the previous night, two guys with painted faces jumped him.

Justine reads the final story Holden wrote for her, which departs from his previous stories and ends with the two of them running away together. Months later, she and Phil contentedly care for their newborn child.

== Cast ==
- Jennifer Aniston as Justine Last
- Jake Gyllenhaal as Thomas "Holden" Worther
- John C. Reilly as Phil Last
- John Carroll Lynch as Jack Field
- Tim Blake Nelson as Bubba
- Zooey Deschanel as Cheryl
- Mike White as Corny
- Deborah Rush as Gwen Jackson
- Aimee Garcia as Nurse

== Critical reception ==
The Good Girl was well received by most critics. Review aggregator Rotten Tomatoes reports an 82% approval rating, based on reviews from 159 critics. The site's consensus reads, "A dark dramedy with exceptional performances from Jennifer Aniston and Jake Gyllenhaal, The Good Girl is a moving and astute look at the passions of two troubled souls in a small town." Metacritic, which assigns a normalized rating out of 100 to reviews from mainstream critics, calculated a "generally favorable" average score of 71, based on 35 reviews.

Much critical praise went to Jennifer Aniston for her against-type performance. Ella Taylor of LA Weekly opined it is "especially gratifying to see her play a woman who's had it up to here with making nice, and making do." Critic James Berardinelli wrote, "Her performance is forceful and effective - she effortlessly submerges herself into the role, and, after only a moment's hesitation, Aniston has vanished and all that's left is lonely, trapped Justine."

Elvis Mitchell of The New York Times wrote, "It's Ms. Aniston who surprises in The Good Girl. In some ways she may feel as trapped as Justine by playing Rachel Green, the poor little rich daddy's girl of television's Friends. She comes up with an inventively morose physicality for Justine: her arms hang at her sides as though shackled; they're not limp appendages but weighed down with unhappiness. The plucky dream girls she's played in movies like the underseen 1999 classic Office Space are expressive and given to anxious displays of hand waving. But here she articulates Justine's sad tales through a narration that's as affected and misery laden as Holden's ragged, ripped-off fiction."

Writing for DVD Talk, Geoffrey Kleinman said, "There are two things which make The Good Girl work so well: the fantastic script by Mike White, which is smart, funny, and honest, and the breakout performance by Jennifer Aniston who simply embodies her character. Whether or not you are a fan of Aniston, you'll appreciate a look at the real depth she has as an actress and I hope to see her in more films that challenge her as an actress."

Roger Ebert gave the film three and a half stars and also praised Aniston's performance, and saying The Good Girl is an "independent film of satiric fire and emotional turmoil".

== Accolades ==
Award	Category	Recipient	Result
Film Independent Spirit Awards	Best Film	The Good Girl	Nominated
Film Independent Spirit Awards	Best Screenplay	Mike White	Won
Film Independent Spirit Awards	Best Female Lead	Jennifer Aniston	Nominated
Film Independent Spirit Awards	Best Supporting Male	John C. Reilly	Nominated
Online Film Critics Society	Best Actress	Jennifer Aniston	Nominated
Satellite Awards	Best Actress – Motion Picture	Jennifer Aniston	Nominated
Satellite Awards	Best Supporting Actor – Motion Picture	John C. Reilly	Nominated
Hollywood Film Awards	Hollywood Actress Award	Jennifer Aniston	Won
Teen Choice Awards	Choice Movie Liar	Jennifer Aniston	Nominated
Teen Choice Awards	Choice Movie Liplock	Jennifer Aniston, Jake Gyllenhaal	Nominated
Teen Choice Awards	Choice Movie Breakout Star – Male	Jake Gyllenhaal	Nominated
Teen Choice Awards	Choice Movie Actress – Drama/Action Adventure	Jennifer Aniston	Won
