= Jun-seong Kim =

Korean-American actor

- Born: Kim Jun-seong; October 4, 1975 (age 50); Hong Kong
- Occupation: Actor
- Years active: 2001–present

Jun-seong Kim (Korean: 김준성) (also credited as Jun Sung Kim, Jun Kim or Brian Kim; born October 4, 1975) is a Hong Kong-born actor of Korean descent. He is perhaps best known for his role as Mike Juhn in the 2007 crime film West 32nd (2007), directed by Michael Kang.

== Biography ==
Jun-seong Kim grew up in Hong Kong, and has spent time in the United States; he is fluent in English, Korean, Mandarin and Cantonese. He majored in Philosophy and Economics while at Wake Forest University in North Carolina, and worked as a stockbroker before becoming an actor. An early experience that turned him on to a career in acting was performing in the musical The Rocky Horror Show in Korea in 2001. In addition to his American debut in the 2007 film West 32nd, Kim starred as FBI agent Henry Joh in Forgotten (2009), a short film involving human trafficking directed by Reuel Kim. He has also appeared in a number of Korean movies and television series, among them Late Autumn (2010), The Scam (2009), Love Exposure (2007), and Lobbyist (2007).

== Filmography ==
=== Films ===
- Blind Devotion (short film, 2015) – Louie
- No Tears for the Dead (2014)
- Innocent Blood (2013) – James Park
- How to Use Guys with Secret Tips (2013) – Oh Ji-hoon
- Rice on White (2012)
- Mandevilla (short film, 2012) – John Kim
- Starlight Inn (short film, 2010) – John Kim
- The Grey Coat (short film, 2010) – Dea Eun
- Late Autumn (2010) – Wang Jing
- Hello (short film, 2010) – Jun Park
- Forgotten (short film, 2009) – Henry Joh
- The Scam (2009) – Brian Choi
- Hellcats (2008) – Young-mi's nail artist (cameo)
- West 32nd (2007) – Mike Juhn
- Love Exposure (2007) – Kwon Young-hoo
- Blossom Again (2005)
- Possible Changes (2005)
- Mr. Handy (2004)
- The Wolf Returns (2004)

=== Television series ===
- Padam Padam (jTBC, 2011) – Chan-gul
- Lobbyist (SBS, 2007) – Michael
- Fly High (SBS, 2007) – Park Kang-woo
- That Woman (SBS, 2005) – Goo Do-yeon
- Fashion 70s (SBS, 2005) – soldier
- Wives on Strike (SBS, 2004) – rich playboy
- Detectives (SBS, 2003)
- South of the Sun (SBS, 2003) – Jung Yun-soo

=== Theater ===
- Happy Together – 칼이수마 Story
- The Road to Jerusalem
- The Rocky Horror Show (2001)
