= Star Maps (film) =

- Theatrical release poster
- Directed by: Miguel Arteta
- Written by: Miguel Arteta; Matthew Greenfield
- Produced by: Matthew Greenfield
- Starring: Douglas Spain; Efrain Figueroa; Kandeyce Jorden; Martha Veléz; Robin Thomas; Zak Penn
- Cinematography: Chuy Chavez
- Edited by: Jeff Betancourt; Tom McArdle; Tony Selzer
- Production companies: King Films; Flan de Coco Films
- Distributed by: Fox Searchlight Pictures
- Release date: July 23, 1997
- Running time: 86 minutes
- Country: United States
- Languages: English; Spanish

Star Maps is a 1997 American drama film co-written and directed by Miguel Arteta and starring Douglas Spain. The film is the directorial debut of Miguel Arteta, and it was first presented at the Sundance Film Festival. It was a critical hit, receiving five Independent Spirit Award nominations, including Best First Feature and Best First Screenplay.

== Synopsis ==
This allegorical tale concerns the gap that exists between East and West Los Angeles as Latino kids try to pursue the American Dream. After five years of living in Mexico, an 18-year-old youth returns to Los Angeles with aspirations of becoming a movie star. At the urging of his father, a pimp who sells maps to stars' homes as a cover, the young man turns to hustling as a way to meet Hollywood insiders. Things start to look up when he hooks up with the producer of the popular daytime soap opera Carmel County. However his overbearing father and his mentally unstable mother threaten to get in the way of his dreams.

== Cast ==
- Douglas Spain as Carlos Amado
- Efrain Figueroa as Pepe Amato
- Kandeyce Jorden as Jennifer Upland
- Lysa Flores as Maria Amato
- Annette Murphy as Letti
- Martha Veléz as Teressa Amato
- Robin Thomas as Martin
- Vincent Chandler as Juancito Amato
- Al Vincente as Fred Marin
- Zak Penn as Carmel County Writer
- Mike White as Carmel County Writer
- Michael Peña as Star Map Boy
- Caesar Garcia as Star Map Boy

== Production ==
The director, Miguel Arteta, came to the US from Puerto Rico at the age of 16. He described Star Maps as the "worst idea" a first time filmmaker could attempt, due to its large number of characters and locations, as well as the unorthodox subject matter. Arteta met the movie's producer Matthew Greenfield while studying film at Wesleyan University. The duo initially tried to convince people in Hollywood to fund the film. However, in the end, it would be financed to the tune of $90,000 by a group of 15 private investors. The first investor they found committed $50,000 to the project. At this point, Arteta and Greenfield went ahead with casting and location scouting. It took a year for them to attain the remaining $40,000. Once they did, they began shooting the movie. The cast and crew primarily consisted of friends, due to the project's financial limitations.

11 months after principal photography began, Arteta wanted re-shoots to make the plot more coherent. Many of Arteta's friends initially wouldn't return his calls when he asked them to come back for the re-shoots. He stated "They thought we should have just worked with what we had and moved on, but we chose to use the money we had originally set aside for post-production to re-shoot, and then worried about raising the additional money for post."

== Release ==
After premiering at the 1997 edition of the Sundance Film Festival, Star Maps was picked up by 20th Century Fox's indie acquisition division Fox Searchlight Pictures for $2.5 million. The deal was seen as a big coup for Arteta. Fox Searchlight would give Star Maps a US theatrical release in July 1997. The film later aired on the Fox Movie Channel, a channel dedicated to 20th Century Fox films.

== Reception ==
On the review aggregator website Rotten Tomatoes, 39% of 18 critics' reviews are positive. Metacritic, which uses a weighted average, assigned the film a score of 61 out of 100, based on 20 critics, indicating "generally favorable" reviews.

== Music ==
Star Maps: Original Motion Picture Soundtrack

Soundtrack album by various artists
- Released: July 29, 1997
- Genre: Soundtrack
- Length: 37:12
- Label: DGC/Geffen Records

Professional ratings
Review scores
Source	Rating
AllMusic	3/5 stars

Coinciding with the film's theatrical release, a soundtrack of modern Latin music was released by DGC/Geffen Records on July 29, 1997.

=== Reception ===
AllMusic's Chris Slawecki awarded it a three out of five star rating, writing "Star Maps: Original Motion Picture Soundtrack accomplishes that rare feat for albums of this type: it brings together a completely unrelated collection of originals by completely unrelated artists, yet seems to somehow create a cohesive whole of a single thematic piece, in this case a collection of the best Latin-influenced modern music."

=== Track listing ===
No.	Title	Artist	Length
1.	"Danza De La Malincha"	David Lewiston	0:26
2.	"Dios"	La Portuaria	3:51
3.	"Compredes Mendes"	Control Machete	3:35
4.	"Don't Drop Your Pants"	King Changó	4:02
5.	"Use It Or Lose It"	Molotov	4:22
6.	"Ay Que Dolor Vivir"	Astrid Hadad Y Los Tarzanes	2:31
7.	"Horn"	Nick Drake	1:20
8.	"Chica Dificil"	Aterciopelados	2:23
9.	"Say Yeah"	DJ Strobe Presents La Casa Grande	4:03
10.	"Rara"	Juana Molina	3:07
11.	"Take Care"	Big Star	2:44
12.	"Beg, Borrow & Steal"	Lysa Flores	3:55
13.	"La Luna"	Martha Velez and Lysa Flores	0:53
Total length:			37:12
