= The Motel (film) =

- Poster
- Directed by: Michael Kang
- Written by: Michael Kang
- Based on: Waylaid by Ed Lin
- Produced by: Miguel Arteta; Karin Chien; Matthew Greenfield; Gina Kwon
- Starring: Jeffrey Chyau; Sung Kang; Jade Wu; Samantha Futerman
- Cinematography: Lisa Leone
- Edited by: David Leonard; Colleen Sharp
- Music by: Nathan Larson
- Production company: Flan de Coco Films
- Distributed by: Palm Pictures
- Release dates: January 24, 2005 (Sundance Film Festival); June 28, 2006 (United States)
- Running time: 76 minutes
- Country: United States
- Languages: English; Cantonese

The Motel is a 2005 American comedy drama film written and directed by Michael Kang in his feature debut. The film won the Humanitas Prize in the Independent Feature Film category, and was nominated for an Independent Spirit Award for Best First Feature.

It is loosely based on the novel Waylaid by Ed Lin.

== Plot ==
Thirteen-year-old Ernest Chin's life is devoted to working at his family's hourly-rate motel, where a steady stream of prostitutes, johns, and various other shady characters come and go. Abandoned by his father, he lives with his mother, grandfather, and younger sister Katie. The film is a loosely assembled series of vignettes examining the difficulty of adolescence. Recurring themes include painful encounters with a bully named Roy and Ernest's persistent feelings of being misunderstood by his family. Ernest also blindly explores his incipient sexuality, which includes nursing a crush on Christine, an older girl who works at a Chinese restaurant nearby. Ernest's life changes after he meets the newest guest at the motel: a self-destructive yet charming Korean-American man named Sam Kim, who is caught in a downward spiral after estrangement from his wife.

== Cast ==
- Jeffrey Chyau as Ernest Chin
- Sung Kang as Sam Kim
- Jade Wu as Ama Chin
- Samantha Futerman as Christine
- Alexis Chang as Katie Chin
- Stephen Cheng as Gung Gung

== Production ==
Michael Kang first met Ed Lin during their time together in a performance troupe, where Kang learned about Lin's plans to write The Motel when it was still in short story form. Kang said he was "inspired by the idea of exploring the worst place to go through puberty. A sleazy motel surrounded by sex seemed about the worst possible setting." Kang developed the script at the 2002 Sundance Writing and Directing Lab, where filmmaker Miguel Arteta was one of his mentors. Arteta would later sign on as one of the film's producers.

Of his adaptation of Lin's work, Kang said, "The two are like Rashomon companion pieces. We each deal with the subject of sexuality with unique voices and attitudes. When it came time to finish the film, I felt like it was good to put a 'based on' credit for the book despite the differences. If the movie helps inspire someone to pick up a book or realize that more than just one Asian American artist exists out there, I thought that would be a good thing."

After a six-month search to find someone to play Ernest, Kang cast Jeffrey Chyau after finding him through a Columbia University after-school program.

== Release ==
The film debuted at the 2005 Sundance Film Festival. It was later given a limited release on June 28, 2006.

The Motel was promoted through grassroots campaigning, including through word-of-mouth and handing out flyers at theaters. Kang promoted the film through the blog pubertysucks.com, the film's official site, and a page on social networking platform Myspace. Leading up to the film's American premiere at New York's Film Forum, Kang also recorded a series of podcasts that gave insight into the making of the film. The podcasts were shared on Film Forum's website.

== Reception ==
The Motel was met with critical acclaim and particular praise went to Michael Kang's directing. The film scored a rating of 88% on the review-aggregate website Rotten Tomatoes based on 32 reviews. The site's critics consensus reads, "A coming-of-age dramedy whose familiar outline is filled in with rewarding empathy and character detail, The Motel marks an impressive feature debut for writer-director Michael Kang." On Metacritic, the film has a score of 70 out of 100 based on 16 reviews, indicating "generally favorable reviews".

Stephen Holden of the New York Times wrote in his positive review that "Michael Kang's small, perfectly observed portrait of a Chinese-American boy captures the glum desperation of inhabiting the biological limbo of early adolescence." Ty Burr of the Boston Globe wrote, "Kang breaks no new narrative ground here, and that's OK; his portrayal of ethnic discombobulation is fresh and freshly seen. The Motel gives the lie to all those mainstream teen sex comedies starring happy, horny gwailos. In his low-fi way, Kang has made an 'Asian - American Pie,' and it has the sting of truth." Elizabeth Weitzman of the New York Daily News said, "Unlike so many indie films, Michael Kang's gently empathetic debut embraces eccentricity without drowning in its own hip irony."

Joe Leydon at Variety said of the film, "Indie coming-of-age dramedy about a precocious Chinese-American youth whose family operates a sleazy roadside motel signals arrival of a singularly promising filmmaker." Leydon ended his review comparing Kang's directing to acclaimed indie directors François Truffaut and Frank Whaley.

In 2019, the Los Angeles Times named The Motel as one of the 20 Best Asian American Films of the last 20 years. It was ranked at the number 18 spot with the description, "This Sundance charmer follows a 13-year-old boy's misadventures growing up in a locale all too familiar to many Asian American immigrants: the family-run motel."

=== Awards and nominations ===
The Motel was the recipient of the Humanitas Prize in the Independent Feature Film category. At the 2007 Independent Spirit Awards, the film was nominated for Best First Feature. Kang won awards for Best Narrative Feature at the San Diego Asian Film Festival, CAAMFest (the San Francisco International Asian American Film Festival), and the Los Angeles Asian Pacific Film Festival.
