= Chuck & Buck =

- Promotional poster
- Directed by: Miguel Arteta
- Written by: Mike White
- Produced by: Matthew Greenfield
- Starring: Mike White; Chris Weitz; Lupe Ontiveros; Beth Colt; Paul Weitz
- Cinematography: Chuy Chávez
- Edited by: Jeff Betancourt
- Music by: Joey Waronker; Tony Maxwell; Josh Mancell Gwendolyn Sanford Gregory Hormel
- Production companies: Blow Up Pictures; Flan de Coco Films
- Distributed by: Artisan Entertainment (United States); Summit Entertainment (International)
- Release dates: January 21, 2000 (Sundance); July 14, 2000
- Running time: 96 minutes
- Country: United States
- Language: English
- Box office: $1.2 million

Chuck & Buck is a 2000 American black comedy drama film directed by Miguel Arteta and produced by Matthew Greenfield. It was written by and starred Mike White in the leading role. Arteta, Greenfield, and White met and first collaborated at Wesleyan University.

== Plot ==
Buck O'Brien is a 27-year-old amateur playwright with the maturity level of an adolescent. When Buck's mother dies unexpectedly, he invites his close childhood friend Chuck to the funeral. Chuck (who is now calling himself "Charlie") is a successful music industry exec with a fiancée, Carlyn. He and Buck experimented sexually with each other when they were 11, but Charlie has repressed these memories and acts as if they had not occurred. Chuck had moved away while they were still children, and Buck has pined after him ever since. During their awkward reunion, Buck makes a sexual advance on Charlie in the bathroom. Charlie rebuffs him, and returns to Los Angeles with Carlyn, but not before extending an obligatory invitation for Buck to visit him there. Buck then withdraws $10,000 from his bank account, packs up his car, and takes up residence in a motel in Los Angeles. He also begins scripting a play on a yellow legal pad: titled "Hank and Frank and the Witch", an obvious plea for Charlie's love.

Too shy to announce his presence right away, Buck starts trying to see Charlie at his office at Trimorph Entertainment. Buck also surreptitiously follows Charlie to find out where he lives. While standing in front of the playhouse across the street from Charlie's job, he strikes up a conversation with Beverly, the house manager. Buck hires Beverly to produce his play, and casts Sam, a talentless actor who bears a strong resemblance to Charlie, in the lead. Buck then works up the nerve to approach Charlie and his girlfriend. After being invited to a party that Charlie and Carlyn host, Buck becomes aware of just how far apart he and Chuck have grown; he feels rejected by Charlie's new friends. He also becomes resentful of Carlyn, who he erroneously believes is interfering with their friendship. As a result of this mind-set, Buck's behavior becomes increasingly erratic and obsessive.

The end of the film deals with both Chuck and Buck confronting each other over their past. The two have sex, and Buck wants Charlie to stay afterward, but Charlie says they must part ways. Buck is distraught afterward, but eventually realizes he has found a new life at the playhouse. When discussing a play over dinner with Beverly, Buck notices Charlie has arrived with Carlyn. Charlie and Buck exchange glances across the room, but Buck ultimately disregards them and goes back to his conversation. Buck comes to the theater to find an invitation to the wedding. Buck arrives at the wedding party and offers the couple his blessing with his presence. Buck and Carlyn make peace as Buck effectively moves on from his obsession with Charlie and keeps their sexual encounter a secret from Carlyn.

== Cast ==
- Mike White as Buck O'Brien
- Chris Weitz as Charlie "Chuck" Sitter
- Lupe Ontiveros as Beverly Franco
- Paul Weitz as Sam
- Maya Rudolph as Jamilla
- Beth Colt as Carlyn
- Mary Wigmore as Diane
- Paul Sand as Barry
- Pamela Gordon as Mrs. O'Brien
- Tony Maxwell as himself

== Analysis ==
Chuck & Buck, although marketed as a comedy, is more widely considered to be a darkly humorous psychological thriller or dramedy, as academic James R. Keller says the film explores "the hysterical fear of exposure some heterosexual males experience" when they have had sexual relations with another man.

== Music ==
The film prominently features the songs:

- Gwendolyn's "Freedom of the Heart"
- Petra Haden's "Look Both Ways Before You Cross"
- Josh Mancell's "Nwo Tew"
- Simon Jeffes' "Air a Danser"

Additionally, Jeffes' "Paul's Dance", "Prelude and Yodel" and "Nothing Really Blue" (as performed by Penguin Café Orchestra) are featured on the soundtrack.

The video for "Doctor Worm" by They Might Be Giants is featured during a scene that takes place in Chuck/Charlie's office. Charlie claims to have signed the band to his label.

== Reception and legacy ==
The film has received generally positive reviews from critics. On the review aggregate website Rotten Tomatoes, it has an 85% approval rating based on 89 reviews, with an average rating of 7.06/10. The website's critical consensus reads: "As poignant as it is unsettling, Chuck & Buck uses the complex dynamic between two men as fuel for untangling a rich assortment of thought-provoking themes". On Metacritic, the film has a weighted average score of 76 out of 100, based on 30 critics, indicating "generally favorable" reviews. It won the John Cassavetes Award at the 16th Independent Spirit Awards. In an interview with The New York Times in 2010, Academy Award-winning actor Jeff Bridges named White's performance the Best of the Decade, while Ontiveros' performance was recognized with the National Board of Review Award for Best Supporting Actress.

== See also ==
- Queer cinema
