= Smother (film) =

- Directed by: Vince Di Meglio
- Written by: Tim Rasmussen; Vince Di Meglio
- Produced by: Jay Roach; Tim Rasmussen; Johnson Chan; Bill Johnson
- Starring: Diane Keaton; Dax Shepard; Liv Tyler
- Cinematography: Julio Macat
- Edited by: Kelly Matsumoto
- Music by: Manish Raval; Tom Wolfe
- Production companies: The Carsey-Werner Company; Variance Films
- Distributed by: Screen Media
- Release dates: April 30, 2008 (Taiwan); September 26, 2008
- Running time: 92 minutes
- Country: United States
- Language: English

Smother is a 2008 comedy film co-written and directed by Vince Di Meglio and starring Diane Keaton as a mother who is over-attached to her adult son, played by Dax Shepard. The film aired on Lifetime in 2009.

== Plot ==
Noah Cooper (Dax Shepard), a therapist, gets fired from the office where he has worked for many years. When he arrives home he finds his wife's cousin, Myron Stubbs (Mike White), has moved in. Later that evening his mother, Marilyn (Diane Keaton), also arrives with her dogs and asks whether she can stay. Even though Noah is displeased, he allows Marilyn to stay. He discovers his mother has left his father, suspecting that he had an affair.

Noah and Marilyn get hired at a carpet store, but because of Marilyn's inadequacy, the boss orders Noah to fire her. He does so, but soon after feels guilt about this and announces his own resignation by beating up both the boss and a costumed genie mascot. Eventually, his father has to bail him out of jail. Meanwhile, his relationship with his wife, Clare (Liv Tyler), deteriorates and she subsequently leaves. Marilyn spies her husband and they have an encounter. Her husband, Gene (Ken Howard), confesses that he cheated on her twice. Noah's grandmother, Helen Cooper (Selma Stern), dies, and at the funeral Noah and Marilyn debate. Noah gets moved by his mother's words and realizes that his decision not to have a baby was wrong and rushes to Clare to apologize. The film ends with Marilyn and Myron moving in together elsewhere.

== Cast ==
- Diane Keaton as Marilyn Cooper
- Dax Shepard as Noah Cooper
- Liv Tyler as Clare Cooper
- Mike White as Myron Stubbs
- Ken Howard as Gene Cooper
- Selma Stern as Helen Cooper
- Jerry Lambert as Donnie Booker
- Don Lake as Minister
- Sarah Lancaster as Holly
- Ron Butler as Friendly Prison Inmate
- Skip Stellicht as voice of Myron's Computer
