= No Tears for the Dead =

- Theatrical release poster
- Hangul: 우는 남자
- Lit.: Crying Man
- RR: Uneun namja
- MR: Unŭn namja
- Directed by: Lee Jeong-beom
- Written by: Lee Jeong-beom
- Produced by: Kim Tae-won
- Starring: Jang Dong-gun; Kim Min-hee; Brian Tee; Kim Hee-won; Jun-seong Kim
- Cinematography: Lee Mo-gae
- Edited by: Nam Na-yeong
- Music by: Choi Yong-rak
- Distributed by: CJ Entertainment
- Release date: June 4, 2014
- Running time: 116 minutes
- Country: South Korea
- Languages: Korean; English
- Box office: US$3.6 million

No Tears for the Dead (Korean: 우는 남자; RR: uneun namja; lit. 'Crying Man') is a 2014 South Korean action film written and directed by Lee Jeong-beom. The film revolves around a professional hitman (Jang Dong-gun) who is conflicted about killing his last target (Kim Min-hee).

== Plot ==
At a restaurant in America, professional hitman Gon quietly interacts with a little girl sitting alone at her table. He then leaves and makes his way to the warehouse behind the restaurant where a man named Ha Yun-guk is making a deal with a group of Russian thugs. Gon kills them all and retrieves Yun-guk's laptop. Hearing a sound behind the door, he shoots through it, only to realize it is the little girl who had followed him. The girl dies, traumatizing Gon who gets drunk to forget the incident.

Gon's close friend, Chaoz, and his two Colombian teammates, Alvaro and Juan, take Gon back to their boss, a Chinese-American Triad named Dai-Ban. Alvaro punches Gon awake from his drunken stupor. Gon is to go to South Korea to tie up the loose end - the little girl's mother Choi Mo-gyeong, a risk manager at an investment firm. Gon stabs Alvaro's right hand in retaliation for punching him, triggering a vendetta within Alvaro. Gon then threatens Dai-Ban to never send men to his home again or he will personally kill him.

At Seoul airport, Gon is received by his local contact, Byun. As he studies Mo-gyeong's routine, he learns of her visits to her senile mother in a hospital and watches as she mourns her daughter. Gon feels even more guilty and conflicted about his task. Mo-gyeong is approached by Detective Park from the financial crimes task force. Park reveals that her supervisor, John Lee, is heavily suspected to have ties with organized crimes. Prior to his assassination, Yun-guk had gained access to John Lee's accounts for money laundering and had begun trying to sell them to the Russian Mob. Park asks Mo-gyeong whether her husband left anything that can implicate John Lee.

Due to the stress of losing her daughter, Mo-gyeong eventually ends up in a hospital. However a Chinese-American street assassin under Dai Ban, named Asing, is sent to eliminate her after he successfully murders the other two "loose ends". Gon arrives just in time to save Mo-gyeong, fighting off Asing. Asing escapes briefly but tries again to kill her in a parking lot. Gon intercepts Asing and shoots him dead. As Gon still hasn't completed his assignment, Dai-Ban sends Chaoz, Juan, and Alvaro to South Korea to find him. Chaoz meets a black market American arms dealer in Seoul and quickly kills him and the bodyguard to avoid paying for the firearms. The gang quickly close in on Mo-gyeong's apartment.

In her apartment, Mo-gyeong finds the file in a pen drive. Park's subordinate betrays Park, shoots him, and takes the drive away. Immediately after giving the drive to John, Park's subordinate is killed by Byun. Byun's thugs prepares to kill Mo-gyeong, but Gon warns her with a call. He then intervenes and kills or severely wounds several of them. However, Chaoz and his teammates also arrive at the scene. Juan and Alvaro finish off the remaining thugs. Gon creates a distraction, knocking down Alvaro and engaging in a firefight with both Chaoz and Juan, allowing Mo-gyeong to escape. He promises to reveal the truth about what happened to her daughter. However, Mo-gyeong is captured by a wounded Alvaro.

Gon asks Chaoz to let Mo-gyeong go, but he refuses. Mo-gyeong is taken to the financial building, which is soon surrounded by cops who arrived after receiving a tip from Gon that there is a bomb in the building. Gon ambushes Alvaro and they engage in a fist-fight. Juan arrives to assist Alvaro but accidentally kills him instead as Gon tricks Juan into shooting Alvaro. Juan hunts down Gon in revenge and discovers Gon wounded. Gon manages to kill Juan with an improvised explosive using a microwave. Meanwhile, Mo-gyeong succeeds in preventing the money transfer to John Lee's account. Byun stabs John to death as he is fed up with John's constant abuse of power. At last, Gon battles Chaoz and both get severely wounded. Gon holds Chaoz at gunpoint but spares him, unwilling to kill his close friend.

Byun discovers Mo-gyeong and beats her up. He tries to rape her before she stabs him to death. After a conversation with Chaoz, Gon tells Mo-gyeong she needs to shoot the next person who enters from the lift because it is her daughter's murderer. Gon himself arrives and is shot by Mo-gyeong. Chaoz arrives soon after and snatches the shotgun from Mo-gyeong. He is about to shoot her when a dying Gon asks him not to. Chaoz holds Gon's hand as he dies. Mo-gyeong tries to reach out to Gon via radio after realizing Gon accidentally killed her daughter. A flashback shows Gon's mother, who abandoned him in the states and killed herself early on in the film, telling him not to cry as they would have a good life once they move to America. However, Gon continues to cry - both as a kid and an adult.

== Cast ==
- Jang Dong-gun as Gon
- Kim Min-hee as Mo-gyeong
- Brian Tee as Chaoz
- Kim Hee-won as Department head Byun
- Jun-seong Kim as John Lee
- Jeon Bae-soo as Detective Jang
- Kim Min-jae as Team leader Park
- Lee Young-lan as Ok-soon
- Anthony Dilio as Juan
- Alexander Wraith as Alvaro
- Rich Ting as Asing
- Angela Bullock as Emma
- Kang Ji-woo as Yoo-mi
- Go Woo-rim as young Gon
- Kim So-jin as Mi-jin
- Kim Ji-seong as Gon's mother
- Park Byung-eun as Ha Yoon-gook
- Kim Won-beom as Park Won-sang
- Byun Yo-han as Song Joon-ki
- Lee Moon-ho as Fat hacker
- Min Seong-wook as Plainclothes detective
- Kim Geu-rim as Policewoman
- Lee Seung-chan as Detective 1
- Yoo Ok-joo as Middle-aged female housekeeper
- Kim Kyeong-hee as Cleaning lady
- Kang Han-na as Kindergarten teacher
- Kim Hyo-min as John Lee's underling
- Hwang Sang-kyeong as Byun's underling 1
- Choi Je-heon as Byun's underling 2
- Ji Geon-woo as Byun's underling 3
- Shin Jae-hwan as Byun's underling 4
- Hyeong-won as Byun's underling 5
- Shin Seong-il as Byun's underling 6
- Nam Yeon-woo as Byun's underling 7
- Park Sang-hun as Byun 's underling 8
- Jang In-sub as Financial crimes special team member 1
- Seo Hyeon-woo as Financial crimes special team member 2
- Lee Kyeong-heon as Financial crimes special team member 3
- Ahn Jeong-mo as Financial crimes special team member 4
- Park Ji-yeon as Ventura Holdings team member 1
- Choi Seung-il as Ventura Holdings team member 2
- Kang Hyeon-woo as Ventura Holdings team member 3
- Kim Tae-hoon as Ventura Holdings team member 4
- Lee kyu-hyung as Ventura Holdings team member 5
- Son Cheol-min as National Forensic Service employee
- Joo Yeong-ho as Explosives demolition team leader
- Yoon Dong-yeong as Explosives demolition team member
- Kim Moon-hak as Analyst
- Lee Dong-hwi as Electric vehicle engineer
- Kim Wan-soo as Control room staff member
- Jeong Seong-woo as Muscle man
- Jeon Byeong-gi as Daeban underling
- Lee Jae-in as Daeban granddaughter
- Moon Soo-ah as Hong-rim Chinese dress
- Jeong Soo-jeong as Female reporter
- Kim Na-hee as Yoo-mi's friend
- Kim Sung-oh as 112 hotline police voice 1
- Baek Hyeon-ik as 112 hotline police voice 2
- Matthew Douma as Slav guard 5

== Production ==
Writer-director Lee Jeong-beom interviewed special forces troops in South Korea and the United States to learn their reality and incorporate it into his screenplay.

To prepare for his role, Jang Dong-gun underwent physical training for four months at a film action school in Seoul and combat training in the United States.

== Box office ==
No Tears for the Dead was released in South Korea on June 4, 2014. Despite its star director and actor, the film underperformed at the box office against Hollywood blockbusters X-Men: Days of Future Past and Edge of Tomorrow. It opened at fifth place on the box office, drawing 600,988 admissions.
