= West 32nd =

- US theatrical poster
- Hangul: 웨스트 32번가
- RR: Weseuteu 32beonga
- MR: Wesŭt'ŭ 32pŏn'ga
- Directed by: Michael Kang
- Written by: Michael Kang; Edmund Lee
- Produced by: Teddy Zee
- Starring: John Cho; Jun-seong Kim; Grace Park
- Cinematography: Simon Coull
- Edited by: David Leonard
- Music by: Nathan Larson
- Distributed by: CJ Entertainment
- Release date: November 22, 2007
- Running time: 86 minutes
- Countries: United States; South Korea
- Languages: English; Korean
- Budget: USD 2.5 million

West 32nd (Korean: 웨스트 32번가) is a 2007 film directed by Michael Kang and written by Edmund Lee of The Village Voice. It stars John Cho, Jun-seong Kim, Grace Park, Jane Kim and Jeong Jun-ho. The plot concerns John Kim (John Cho), an ambitious young lawyer in New York, who takes on a pro-bono case involving a fourteen-year-old Korean boy accused of murder. Upon investigating the case, he meets Mike Juhn (Jun Sung Kim), a street thug from Flushing. The two quickly realize the benefits of working together. A well-written and designed screenplay, West 32nd shows the differences and similarities between the two worlds.

== Plot ==
The film starts by showing the city streets of Korea-Town in New York and then goes straight into a room salon. Korean mobster Jin Ho Chun (Jun-ho Jeong) runs the place as a money launderer for the Korean mafia. Chun makes sure the room salon is running smoothly by taking care of customers. His mistress, Sook Hee (Jane Kim), makes her first appearance while entertaining some VIP customers. Chun then grabs a bag full of cash and makes his way into his car. As Chun begins to drive off, another car blocks his way, and he gets shot to death while still in his car.

Ambitious young lawyer John Kim (John Cho) is introduced; John Kim has just taken on a case that could push him up the ladder to becoming a partner at his law firm. The case revolves around a young teenager, misfit youth Kevin Lee, who is accused of murdering Mobster Chun. Kim takes on the case pro bono for the Lee family. Kim is discussing the case with Kevin's older sister Lila Lee (Grace Park), who is still in shock over her brother's case.

Kim assures Lee that they will win the case and there's nothing to worry about. While investigating the case, Kim comes across Mike Juhn (Jun-seoung Kim) and a low-level street thug Danny, who on occasion plays basketball with Kim and runs with Juhn's Crew. Kim sees this meeting as an opportunity to learn more about the case and approaches Juhn. Juhn, who has now taken Chun's old position in running the room salon, meets Kim. Juhn is hesitant at first but gradually opens up when he sees Kim as a way for him to become a legitimate businessman. The two men start using each other to get to the top of their profession. Juhn takes Kim to the room salon. At the room salon, Juhn's boss Detective Park approaches him and asks him who the outsider is. Juhn lies, but Detective Park catches him and lectures him about bringing in outsiders. Juhn challenges Detective Park, saying that Kim could be good for the organization. Detective Park then demotes Juhn.

While Juhn's being demoted, Kim meets Hee, the mistress of the recently deceased Chun. Kim has a light conversation with Hee before being interrupted by Detective Park, who tells Kim that he doesn't belong here and that Kim should leave. Juhn goes down to a restaurant, where he meets with the street bosses for his reckless behavior. One of the bosses tells Juhn that another mobster, Kyuc, will be taking over, and ban Juhn from the salon. The angry Juhn disobeys orders and brings Kim to the Room salon again, where Kim meets Hee for a second time and is able to give Hee his business card before getting kicked out. After the two are kicked out, Kim and Juhn go to a bar, where Juhn starts talking about his past. Juhn reveals that he and Lee went to high school together. Kim then starts pressing Juhn to talk about the case. Juhn finally gives in and talks about the murder, telling Kim that Chun was a snake. And that anyone would have wanted him dead hinting that Kevin might have not been involved in the murder but the organization.

While Juhn is having problems of his own Kim is in the same situation. Whereas Kim's Bosses at his law firm are telling him to cut a deal with the District Attorney's office saying that they don't want to pursue the case for fear of losing. Kim tells Lee about the situation and Lee disagrees saying that there's something more they have to do. Kim then sets a meeting with Lee and Hee. Hee, who cannot speak a word of English and Kim who cannot speak a word of Korean, needs Lee to translate for them, Kim starts the recorder and asks Lee to have Hee begin. During the conversation Hee starts to reveal shocking facts about the murder. Such as how she saw a young boy come out of Chun's car after the shooting. Hee then reveals that she also saw Juhn at the night of the murder. Lee who is shocked from hearing all the details finally realizes that her brother was the one who committed the murder. She then keeps the information about her brother being there from Kim telling him that it was Juhn and only Juhn who was there at the night of the murder. Lee who now is distraught calls Juhn feeling she has nowhere else to go.

Saeng, Juhn's right-hand man and Danny are outside a restaurant with other members of Juhn's crew. Saeng then gets a call from Juhn saying it's time. Saeng gathers all the men and heads with Juhn to the Room salon Juhn used to run and raid the place. Having a big shootout with Kyuc and his men leading to Kyuc and Det Parks demise and Danny's leg being shot. Juhn then tells Saeng to get the money and says that he's going to handle Hee. When searching for Hee she was nowhere to be found, Juhn and Saeng then take the injured Danny to their headquarters. Leaving Saeng to take care of Danny while Juhn goes to find Hee, Juhn goes to Hee's house and finds her packing her clothes Juhn rapes her and beats her to death.

While at the headquarters the scared Danny calls Kim and tells him about the situation. Kim quickly rushes down to where Danny is and pushes Saeng out of the way and calls the cops and advises Danny to don't tell the cops anything. Then Kim realizes Hee might be in danger to and rushes to her house once he gets there Kim finds Hee's dead body. After along day Kim retreats to his home and is ambushed by Juhn's men. Where Juhn starts to reveal more about the murder to Kim how he ordered Kevin to murder Chun saying that Kevin wanted to prove his loyalty and how Lee called him after the conversation Kim had with Lee and Hee. After the confession Juhn pulls out his gun and gets ready to murder Kim, Kim tells Juhn there will be consequences if Juhn pulls the trigger. Kim tells Juhn that he has the recording of the conversation he had with Lee and Hee and there's a way for the recording to find its way into the polices' hands if Juhn were to pull the trigger. Juhn thinks about the consequences and gives Kim a pass telling Kim to stay out of Flushing or there will be no more passes. Kim then quickly sets a meeting up with Lee and confronts her about the situation. Lee tells Kim she had no choice and that Kim would have done the same thing if it was his brother.

Kim sets another meeting up but with Juhn at a local bar that Kim's a regular at once the meeting started Kim asked Juhn for a favor. Juhn refused until Kim convinces him otherwise. Revealing to Juhn that Danny a member of Juhn's crew is now Kim's client and that he can make Danny go either way. Juhn now realizes the situation and agrees to help Kim. Kim tells Juhn that he doesn't care now, whether Kevin murdered Chun or not he just wants to win the case and tells Juhn to find someone who can be a witness that doesn't put Kevinat the scene of the crime. Juhn agrees, Kim then gives Juhn the recorder with the recording on it. Kim is seen in a new office talking to friend about making partner, Lee walks in with a box of tangerines to thank Kim for getting Kevin out of prison After Lee leaves Kim throws the box in the trash. Juhn is now running the Room salon again. Juhn comes to pick up the bag of money as he's walking to his car his cellphone rings he picks up but there's no answer he hangs up and gets into his car and adjust the rear view mirror and starts to glare at the mirror and the screen goes black.

== Cast ==
- John Cho as John Kim, an ambitious lawyer who took on the murder case of Lila Lee's Brother Kevin
- Jun-seong Kim (credited as Jun Sung Kim) as Mike Juhn, a mobster in the Korean mob who's willing to do anything to get on top
- Grace Park as Lila Lee, the older sister of Kevin Lee
- Jung Joon-ho as Chun Jin-ho, a mobster in the Korean Mob who was murdered
- Jane Kim as Kim Sook-hee, a prostitute mistress of Jin-ho Chun
- Lanny Joon as Saeng, Juhn's right-hand man
- Hans Kim as Kyuc, the Korean mobster who takes over for Juhn at the Room salon after Juhn is demoted
- Han Hee-jun (credited as Dante Han) as Danny, a Low level street thug who runs with Juhn's crew
- Chil Kong as Detective Park, a dirty cop who's on the payroll of the Korean mob and also Juhn's hyung (older brother AKA boss)
