= Cracking Up (TV series) =

American television sitcom

- Genre: Sitcom
- Created by: Mike White
- Written by: Dana Baratta; Mike White
- Directed by: Jay Chandrasekhar; Jim Ellis; Jake Kasdan; Michael Spiller; Lev L. Spiro
- Starring: Jason Schwartzman; Jake Sandvig; Molly Shannon; Christopher McDonald; Caitlin Wachs; David Walton
- Theme music composer: Jason Schwartzman
- Composer: Rob Cairns
- Country of origin: United States
- Original language: English
- No. of seasons: 1
- No. of episodes: 12

Production
- Executive producers: Brad Grey; Peter Traugott; Chris Weitz; Paul Weitz; Mike White; David Hemingson; Alan J. Higgins; Jason Schwartzman
- Producers: James C. Hart; Denis Biggs; Dana Baratta; Kim Hamberg; Phil Lord; Christopher Miller; Gregg Glickman; Danielle Weinstock
- Cinematography: Joe Pennella
- Editors: David Helfand; Jan Northrop; Mark Scheib
- Camera setup: Single-camera
- Running time: 22–24 minutes
- Production companies: Brad Grey Television; Go Mike Go Productions; 20th Century Fox Television

Original release
- Network: Fox
- Release: March 9 – April 5, 2004

Cracking Up is an American television sitcom created by Mike White, who also served as the series' head writer. It was produced by Brad Grey Television, Go Mike Go Productions and 20th Century Fox Television and aired on Fox from March 9 to April 5, 2004.

== Premise ==
Psychology graduate student Ben Baxter (Jason Schwartzman) is asked by his university professor (Henry Gibson) to be a live-in psychotherapist to Tanner Shackleton (Bret Loehr), the 9-year-old son of an influential Beverly Hills couple (Molly Shannon and Christopher McDonald). Upon meeting Tanner, his parents, and his two teenage siblings (Jake Sandvig and Caitlin Wachs), Ben immediately concludes that Tanner is the only normal member of the Shackleton family and considers rejecting the assignment. Because he is ultimately unwilling to abandon Tanner and hopes documenting the rest of the family's dysfunction will advance his career, Ben accepts the assignment and moves from his dormitory into the Shackletons' guest house.

== Cast ==
- Molly Shannon as Lesley Shackleton
- Christopher McDonald as Ted Shackleton
- Caitlin Wachs as Chloe Shackleton
- Jake Sandvig as Preston Shackleton
- Bret Loehr as Tanner Shackleton
- David Walton as Liam Connor
- Jason Schwartzman as Ben Baxter

== Production ==
According to White, production of the show was plagued by interference from Fox network executives, who wanted Cracking Up to have a more mainstream appeal and retain the sizable lead-in audience from reality singing competition American Idol. Because of this interference, White hoped the show would be dropped after the pilot episode. When production of the show continued, White sent a "fuck you all" fax to the head of Fox programming, which did not result in his firing, despite bringing the receiving executive to tears. At the behest of a psychiatrist, White went to Las Encinas Hospital for treatment, but fled from the psychiatric facility after insisting to a skeptical staff that there was nothing wrong with him other than being highly stressed. Three days after White left the hospital, Fox cancelled Cracking Up, much to his relief.

== Episodes ==
No.	Title	Directed by	Written by	Original release date	Prod. code	Viewers (millions)
1	"Pilot"	Marc Buckland	Mike White	March 9, 2004	1AHS01	11.3
Ben is assigned by his university professor to become Tanner's live-in psychotherapist. He acquaints himself with the dysfunctional Shackleton family and their live-in housekeeper, Dorsa (Lillian Hurst), a Cuban immigrant who tells Ben the Shackletons are holding her against her will by withholding her immigration documents.
2	"Birds Do It"	Miguel Arteta	David Hemingson	March 10, 2004	1AHS05	9.5
Tanner unintentionally walks in on Ben and his psychology-student girlfriend, Heidi (Zooey Deschanel), in the midst of having sex. When Ben tries to prompt Lesley and Ted to have an open dialogue about sex with their children, he learns how sexually repressed and dysfunctional the couple is and that they have already passed some of their unhealthy attitudes about sex onto Chloe and Preston. Ben's friend and former roommate, Liam (David Walton), invites a woman over to the Shackleton home to make out with Preston after he learns the boy has no sexual experience.
3	"Scared Straight"	Greg Mottola	Rebecca Hughes	March 15, 2004	1AHS07	4.9
Ben brings Tanner along to his old dorm room to retrieve some belongings, where they encounter a student visibly high on cannabis. When Ben tries to prompt Lesley and Ted to have an open dialogue about drug use with their children, the couple instead hires Bruce (Jack Black), who was formerly incarcerated on drug charges, to scare the kids straight.
4	"Panic House"	Michael Spiller	Al Higgins	March 22, 2004	1AHS06	4.4
After Ben chases away an unknown nearly-nude man (Kyle Gass) he discovers in the Shackletons' kitchen, the family is gripped by fear. Lesley is constantly worried another home invasion will occur and is uncomfortable when no adult males (like Ben or Ted) are present. Preston instinctively lashes out when touched unexpectedly, and Chloe begins wearing a Puritan-style dress in the hope it will make her less sexually attractive to potential intruders. Matters are made worse when Ben, Lesley, and all three children become trapped in the family's unfinished panic room.
5	"Grudge Match"	Jay Chandrasekhar	Rebecca Hughes & Mike White	March 29, 2004	1AHS04	4.1
Ben discovers that Tanner is a talented sketch artist, but Lesley and Ted find his latest drawing disturbing and forbid him from entering it into a school art fair. Ted ignores Ben's advice to nurture Tanner's artistic talent and unsuccessfully tries to coach him in basketball to make him more like his athletic siblings. Ben and Liam play Ted and Preston in a two-on-two basketball game to give Tanner time to enter the fair and teach the Shackletons that winning is not all-important. Lesley wrestles with painful memories and the loss of Chloe's respect after Ted reminds her she was kicked off her cheerleading squad for performing unconventional cheers.
6	"Prom Night"	Penelope Spheeris	Deborah Swisher	April 5, 2004	1AHS09	3.4
Preston and Chloe have dates to their school prom. To quell Lesley and Ted's fears that they may have sex, drink or do drugs, Liam goes along as a chaperone, but the siblings still manage to get drunk after succumbing to peer pressure. Ben learns that Ted is resentful he never went to prom because Lesley went with another date, musician Steve Evers (John C. Reilly). To help Ted get over this resentment, Ben brings him to a coffee shop where a middle-aged Steve is working as a barista with his girlfriend (Amy Sedaris). Elated that Steve is working a menial job, Ted invites him over for dinner to showcase his perceived career failure in front of Lesley.
7	"Daddy's Home"	N/A	N/A	Unaired	1AHS02	N/A
8	"Learning Disability"	N/A	N/A	Unaired	1AHS03	N/A
9	"The Fixer"	N/A	N/A	Unaired	1AHS08	N/A
10	"The Pool Man"	N/A	N/A	Unaired	1AHS10	N/A
11	"The Bully"	N/A	N/A	Unaired	1AHS11	N/A
12	"Come Home Lassie"	N/A	N/A	Unaired	1AHS12	N/A

== Reception ==
Tim Goodman of SFGate labeled Cracking Up "slightly off," "oddly flat" and "filled with unrealized potential." He stated that the "high-octane" performances of Shannon and McDonald clashed with Schwartzman's "low-key vibes" and Loehr's "flat child acting." He also criticized Wachs and Sandvig's characters for being too broadly drawn and believed the show was limited by its "one-note" premise. Goodman credited Fox for not inserting a laugh track, but qualified that the show's jokes either went "splat" or "la[id] there meekly in a pool of what could be construed as irony." He also said Cracking Up couldn't match the "daring subtlety" of Arrested Development or the "manic physical comedy" of Malcolm in the Middle.

Rob Owen of the Pittsburgh Post-Gazette said White was "writing in his comfort zone" and that, like his previous works, Cracking Up was "not typical television." He described the show as "a subtle shade of funny" that benefited from being shot with a single camera and not using a studio audience. He also expressed doubt that the show's brand of humor was obvious enough to fit in on mainstream network television.

Carina Chocano of the Los Angeles Times labeled Cracking Up's humor "broad" and its premise "reasonably promising, if contrived." She stated, "White has made a career of exploring the inner lives of characters who straddle the line between weird and crazy. His previous projects have been subtly funny, sad and unsettling in equal measure. In 'Cracking Up,' he removes the hinges completely, with less compelling results." Chocano described the character of Tanner as "a Marilyn Munster in the era of Dr. Phil" and a "morose killjoy." She felt Shannon and McDonald performed generally well, but that all of the Shackletons (other than Tanner) shared "a collective, nerve-jangling mania" and "a single, Dale Carnegie-trained personality." She described Schwartzman as "quietly amusing," but lacking "the oddball intensity" of his Rushmore character. Chocano also noted a tonal shift between the pilot and the second episode, which she speculated was the result of interference by network executives. She stated, "The family of chirpy perverts introduced in the pilot episode suddenly gives way to an Up With People-style chastity cult."

Freelance film critic Eric D. Snider said that he "loved" Cracking Up's pilot, but gave up on the series after the subsequent three episodes. He said he initially thought the show held "great promise," but that it "trie[d] too hard to be wacky" and continuously fell back on the same over-the-top joke (namely that every character was crazy). Snider said Arrested Development successfully executed a similar premise, being more dryly written and not hitting audiences over the head with the quirkiness of its characters.
