= Late Autumn (2010 film) =

2010 South Korean-American-Chinese-Hong Kong film by Kim Tae-yong

- South Korean poster
- Hangul: 만추
- Hanja: 晩秋
- RR: Manchu
- MR: Manch'u
- Directed by: Kim Tae-yong
- Written by: Kim Tae-yong
- Based on: Manchu by Kim Ji-heon
- Produced by: Lee Jooick; Nansun Shi; Cho Sung-woo
- Starring: Hyun Bin; Tang Wei
- Cinematography: Kim Woo-hyung
- Edited by: Steve M. Choe; Jin Lee
- Music by: Jo Seong-woo; Choi Yong-rak
- Distributed by: Boram Entertainment; North by Northwest Entertainment; CJ Entertainment
- Release dates: 10 September 2010 (Toronto); 17 February 2011 (South Korea)
- Running time: 115 minutes
- Countries: South Korea; United States; China; Hong Kong
- Languages: English; Korean; Mandarin
- Box office: US$5.9 million

Late Autumn (Korean: 만추; RR: Manchu) is a 2010 English-language film directed by Kim Tae-yong. It stars Tang Wei as Anna, a prisoner who is given a 72 hours parole to visit family in Seattle, and who meets and befriends a South Korean man on-the-run (Hyun Bin).

A co-production between South Korea, China, Hong Kong and the United States, it is the fourth remake of the now-lost 1966 Lee Man-hee melodrama classic of the same title.

== Plot ==
Anna (Tang Wei), an immigrant from China, has been in prison for seven years for the manslaughter of her husband (John Woo), who was jealous over her re-meeting her former boyfriend Wang Jing (Jun-seong Kim). Hearing that her mother has died and her brother John has arranged her bail, Anna is given 72 hours parole to visit her family in Seattle. On the coach she meets a young Korean man, Hoon (Hyun Bin), who borrows US$30 towards a ticket, and he gives her his watch as security, promising to pay her back later. Unknown to Anna, Hoon is a gigolo on the run from powerful businessman Steve (James C. Burns), who wants to kill him for having an affair with his Korean wife, Ok-ja (Jeong So-ra). Hoon meets Anna again in Seattle, and the pair spend time together. The next day he turns up at her mother's funeral, and gets into a fight with Wang at a restaurant afterwards. When Anna boards the bus to return to prison the following day, Hoon initially says goodbye, but he later joins her on the bus ride. When the bus stops at a rest point, Steve and his henchmen catch up on Hoon. Steve tells Hoon that Ok-ja is dead, and the police are on the way to find Hoon, implying that Steve has killed Ok-ja and intends to frame Hoon for her murder. Shocked about the news, Hoon goes to find Anna, and they exchange a passionate kiss. Hoon then promises that he will be waiting for Anna at the rest point when she gets out of prison. In the next scene, Anna wakes up in the bus, which is still at the rest point, but Hoon is nowhere to be found. As the bus readies to leave, Anna frantically searches for Hoon, while a police car arrives in the background. Two years later, Anna is set free and leaves prison. She comes to the rest point, and waits for Hoon in silence.

== Cast ==
- Hyun Bin as Hoon
- Tang Wei as Anna
- Jun-seong Kim as Wang Jing
- James C. Burns as Steve
- Jeong So-ra as Ok-ja
- John Woo as Anna's husband
- Danni Lang as Jiang Huang, Wang Jing's wife
- Katarina Choi as Isabel

== Release ==
The film premiered at the 2010 Toronto International Film Festival. It also screened at the 15th Busan International Film Festival, the 61st Berlin International Film Festival, and the Fribourg International Film Festival. The film was released in Korean theaters on February 17, 2011 and took ₩6.3 billion (US$5.55 million) in the box office.

It became the highest grossing Korean film released in China to date, quickly gathering over 910,000 admissions after its March release, with a total box office take of more than 60 million yuan (₩11 billion or US$9.5 million).

== Awards ==
2011 Fribourg International Film Festival

- Ex-Change Award by Youth Jury
- Special Mention of the Jury of the International Federation of Film Societies

2011 Baeksang Arts Awards

- Best Actress: Tang Wei

2011 Grand Bell Awards

- Best Music: Jo Seong-woo, Choi Yong-rak

2011 Korean Association of Film Critics Awards

- Best Actress: Tang Wei
- Best Music: Jo Seong-woo

2011 Busan Film Critics Awards

- Best Film
- Best Actress: Tang Wei

2012 KOFRA Film Awards

- Best Actress: Tang Wei
