= Mike White (filmmaker) =

American actor, writer and producer (born 1970)

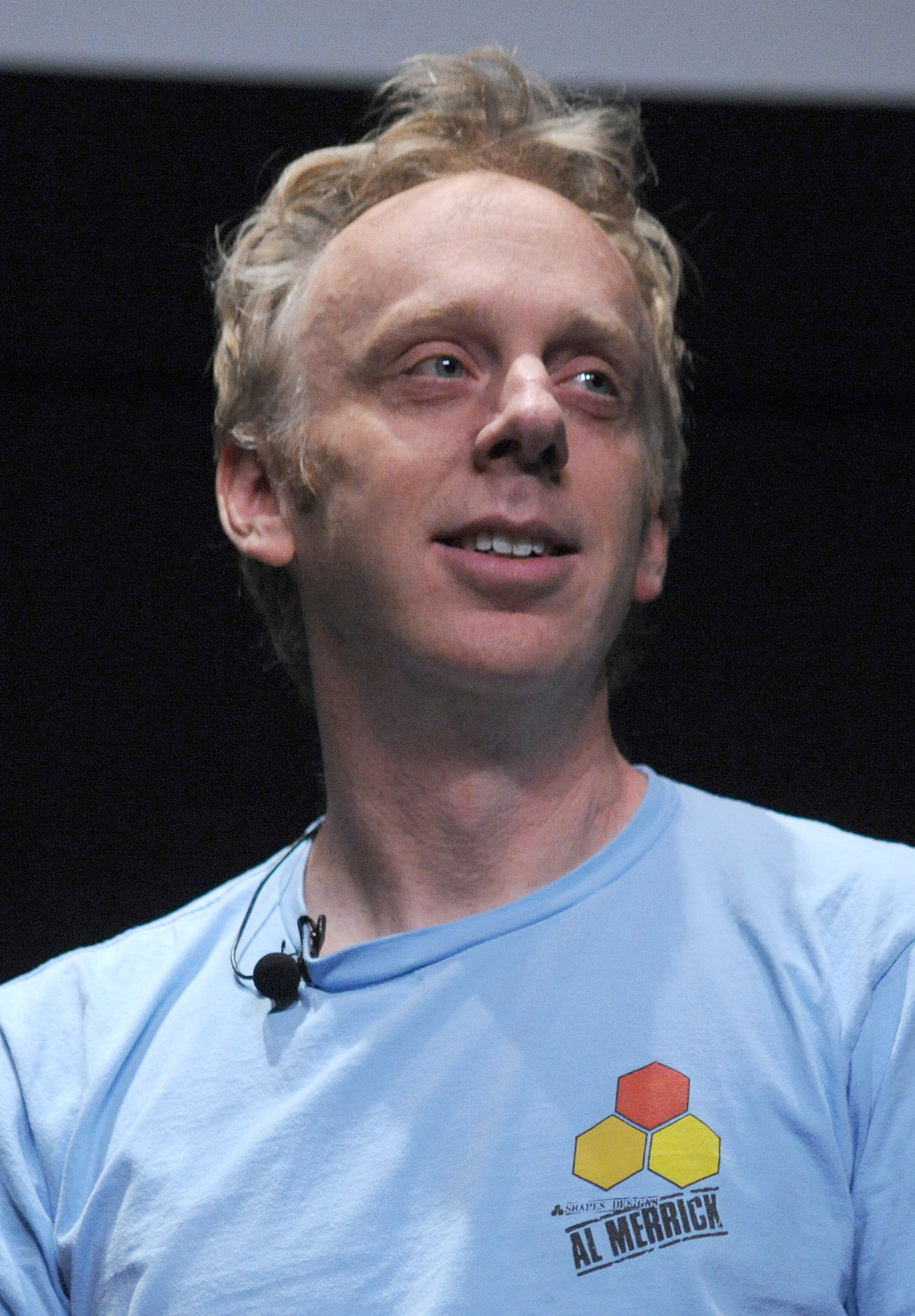
- White in 2011
- Born: Michael Christopher White; June 28, 1970 (age 56); Pasadena, California, U.S.
- Education: Wesleyan University (BA)
- Occupations: Screenwriter; actor; producer; director
- Years active: 1997–present
- Known for: Creator of The White Lotus
- Father: Mel White

Michael Christopher White (born June 28, 1970) is an American filmmaker and actor. He created, writes, and directs the ongoing HBO satirical comedy anthology series The White Lotus, for which he has won three Primetime Emmy Awards.

White also won an Independent Spirit John Cassavetes Award for the 2000 film Chuck & Buck, which he wrote and starred in. He has written the screenplays for films such as School of Rock (2003) and has directed several films that he has written, such as Brad's Status (2017). White was a co-creator, executive producer, writer, director and actor on the HBO series Enlightened. He is also known for his appearances on reality television, competing on two seasons of The Amazing Race and later becoming a contestant and runner-up on Survivor: David vs. Goliath.

== Early life ==
White was born in Pasadena, California. He is the son of Lyla Lee (née Loehr), a fundraising executive, and former executive director of the Pasadena Playhouse, and James Melville "Mel" White, a former speechwriter and ghostwriter for Religious Right figures such as Jerry Falwell and Pat Robertson. His father later came out as gay in 1994. Due to his father's religious background, White grew up in a modest household in a conservative Christian community. He attended Polytechnic School which he described as a "very conservative country-club school". Later he went to Wesleyan University, where he met writing partner, Zak Penn. Penn convinced him to move back to Los Angeles, and helped him to get work soon after graduating.

== Career ==
Although White and Penn's writing partnership ended a few years later due to their different sensibilities, they remained on good terms, and White credits Penn with getting him into Hollywood's social circles. White was a writer and producer on Dawson's Creek and Freaks and Geeks and wrote and acted in the films Chuck & Buck, The Good Girl, Orange County, School of Rock and Nacho Libre. He also had a role in the 2004 remake of The Stepford Wives, and the 2008 film Smother. Chuck & Buck, in which White portrayed a manchild who stalks his childhood friend, was named the best film of 2000 by Entertainment Weekly. In an interview with The New York Times, Jeff Bridges called White's turn in Chuck & Buck "the performance of the decade".

He frequently collaborates with actor–writer Jack Black on films. Together they formed the production company Black and White, which closed in 2006. White is not a fan of classic rock, but he wrote School of Rock specifically so Black could perform his own favorite rock music.

White made his directorial debut with the self-penned Year of the Dog at the 2007 Sundance Film Festival. He was a member of the US Dramatic Jury at the 2009 Sundance Film Festival.

Laura Dern brought White into a project with HBO which became the series Enlightened that premiered on October 10, 2011. Dern's character, Amy Jellicoe, goes to a Hawaiian retreat after her professional life publicly implodes, and is introduced to meditation. White himself had suffered an on-the-job meltdown while running an earlier television series, and incorporated elements of that experience, as well as his own exploration of Buddhist meditation, into the new series' plot. White wrote the pilot and all the episodes in the first and second seasons.

White is a credited writer on The Emoji Movie; he spent three weeks with the film's screenwriters and helped with the structure of the script. For this project, he received a Golden Raspberry Award. He wrote and directed the 2017 film Brad's Status.

In February 2022, it was announced White would write two upcoming animated films for Universal Pictures and Illumination: the original comedy Migration, released on December 22, 2023, and the fourth installment in the Despicable Me franchise, which was released on July 3, 2024.

=== The Amazing Race ===
White appeared on the fourteenth season of The Amazing Race along with his father Mel. They lasted for seven legs before being eliminated in sixth place in Phuket, Thailand. Mel and Mike returned to compete in The Amazing Race: Unfinished Business, where they were the second team eliminated in Japan after they both developed hypothermia. Both times, he ended up stuck on the island of Ko Samui, which was used by the show as its elimination station. Due to these unhappy memories, he was initially reluctant to return there to film the third season of The White Lotus.

=== Survivor ===
White was a contestant on Survivor: David vs. Goliath, as a member of the Goliath tribe, then to reshuffled Jabeni tribe and the merged Kalokalo tribe. He made it to Day 39 and received three jury votes, finishing in second place behind the winner, Nick Wilson.

White said he had been a big fan of the show, and because of his connections had developed a friendship with the show's host Jeff Probst, providing the host suggestions towards improving the show. For instance, Probst stated that it was White who discouraged him from bringing back Redemption Island for Survivor: San Juan del Sur. At some point White decided to start trying out to be a participant of the show, but he failed to be picked over what he believed was a concern of having "sloppy seconds" from other reality television programs. White noted that once he was selected, he had had no other conversations with Probst until the game was concluded.

Several of White's fellow Survivor players have appeared in cameos on The White Lotus, including Alec Merlino (season 1), Angelina Keeley and Kara Kay (season 2), and Natalie Cole, Carl Boudreaux and Christian Hubicki (season 3).

On May 28, 2025, White was announced as a contestant on Survivor 50: In the Hands of the Fans, the fiftieth season of the show. He placed 20th out of 24. He was on Kalo to begin with, but then went to Vatu, who continued to lose challenges, then got voted out in a 3-2-1 vote with Angelina Keeley voting with him.

=== The White Lotus ===
In 2021, White created, wrote, and directed The White Lotus, a satirical limited series for HBO, after being approached by HBO during the COVID-19 pandemic for ideas. HBO went on to greenlight two more seasons, which have different locations and casts and very little continuity between them. White has brought back three actors over the course of the series: Jennifer Coolidge, Natasha Rothwell, and Jon Gries. The concept for the series was "partly inspired" by White's work on an earlier proposed series which was never picked up by any network: The Tears of St. Patsy, which would have featured "Coolidge as a frustrated actor navigating a dangerous world". In 2023, White alluded to this earlier setback when he won a Golden Globe for The White Lotus and said: "Everybody passed. I know you all passed".

The third season of The White Lotus was delayed to 2025 due to the impact of the 2023 SAG-AFTRA strike. As of March 2025, The White Lotus was averaging millions of viewers per episode. It became "the biggest hit" of White's career, drawing comparisons to the best shows of the prestige television era of the 2010s. About finding his greatest success in his mid-fifties, White compared himself to a surfer waiting for a wave who is just about to swim in: "And then I catch a wave? I'm definitely going to ride this wave".

== Personal life ==
White is vegan and lives in Santa Monica. He also owns a house in Kaua’i. He is bisexual. In a 2025 interview with The New Yorker, White said that his relationship with his partner Josh had fallen apart due to The White Lotus taking over his schedule.

== Filmography ==
=== Film ===
Title	Year	Director	Screenwriter	Producer	Notes	Ref.
Dead Man on Campus	1998	No	Yes	No		
Chuck & Buck	2000	No	Yes	No		
Orange County	2002	No	Yes	No		
The Good Girl	2002	No	Yes	No		
School of Rock	2003	No	Yes	No		
Nacho Libre	2006	No	Yes	Yes		
Year of the Dog	2007	Yes	Yes	Yes	Directorial debut	
The Hills with James Franco and Mila Kunis	2007	No	No	Yes	Short film	
Gentlemen Broncos	2009	No	No	Yes		
Magic Magic	2013	No	No	Yes		
The D Train	2015	No	No	Yes		
Beatriz at Dinner	2017	No	Yes	No		
The Emoji Movie	2017	No	Yes	No		
Brad's Status	2017	Yes	Yes	No		
Pitch Perfect 3	2017	No	Yes	No		
The One and Only Ivan	2020	No	Yes	No		
Migration	2023	No	Yes	No		
Despicable Me 4	2024	No	Yes	No		

==== Acting credits ====
Title	Year	Role	Notes	Ref.
Star Maps	1997	Carmel County Writer		
Chuck & Buck	2000	Buck O'Brien		
Orange County	2002	Mr. Burke		
The Good Girl	2002	Corny		
School of Rock	2003	Ned Schneebly		
The Stepford Wives	2004	Hank		
Are You the Favorite Person of Anybody?	2005	Respondent	Short film	
Welcome to California	2005	John Goodman		
Smother	2008	Myron Stubbs		
Gentlemen Broncos	2009	Dusty		
Zombieland	2009	Gas Station Clerk		
Ride	2014	Roger		
The D Train	2015	Jerry		
Brad's Status	2017	Nick Pascale		
The One and Only Ivan	2020	Frankie (voice) / Passing Driver		

=== Television ===
Title	Year(s)	Director	Writer	Producer	Creator	Notes	Ref.
Dawson's Creek	1998–1999	No	Yes	Supervising	No	Wrote 9 episodes / Produced 22 episodes	
Freaks and Geeks	2000	No	Yes	Supervising	No	Wrote 3 episodes / Produced 17 episodes	
Pasadena	2001–2002	No	Yes	Executive	Yes	Created and produced 13 episodes / Wrote 6 episodes.	
Cracking Up	2004–2006	No	Yes	Executive	Yes	Created and produced 12 episodes / Wrote episode: "The Fixer"	
Earth to America	2005	No	Yes	No	No	Television special	
Enlightened	2011–2013	Yes	Yes	Executive	Yes	Created, wrote and produced 18 episodes / Directed 6 episodes	
The Boring Life of Jacqueline	2012	No	No	Executive	No	10 episodes	
Mamma Dallas	2016	Yes	Yes	Executive	No	Television pilot	
School of Rock	2016	No	Yes	No	No	Episode: "Come Together" / Also wrote original theatrical film	
The White Lotus	2021–present	Yes	Yes	Executive	Yes	Anthology series, wrote and directed every episode	

==== Acting credits ====
Title	Year(s)	Role	Notes	Ref.
Freaks and Geeks	2000	Chip Kelly	Episode: "Kim Kelly Is My Friend"	
Undeclared	2001	Pet Store Employee	Episode: "Eric Visits"	
Pushing Daisies	2007	Billy Balsam	Episode: "Bitter Sweets"	
Enlightened	2011–2013	Tyler	15 episodes	
Mamma Dallas	2016	Himself	Television pilot	

==== Appearances ====
Title	Year	Notes	Ref.
Dog Whisperer with Cesar Millan	2007	Dog owner	
The Amazing Race 14	2009	6th place (with father, Mel White)	
The Amazing Race: Unfinished Business	2011	10th place (with father, Mel White)	
Survivor: David vs. Goliath	2018	Runner-up	
Survivor 50: In the Hands of the Fans	2026	20th place	

== Awards and nominations ==
Year	Organizations	Category	Work	Result	Ref.
2023	BAFTA TV Awards	Best International Programme	The White Lotus	Nominated	
2003	Critics' Choice Awards	Best Song	School of Rock (song: "School of Rock")	Nominated	
2022	Directors Guild of America Awards	Outstanding Directing – Comedy Series	The White Lotus (episode: "Mysterious Monkeys")	Nominated	
2023	Directors Guild of America Awards	Outstanding Directing – Comedy Series	The White Lotus (episode: "Arrivederci")	Nominated	
2000	Independent Spirit Awards	John Cassavetes Award	Chuck & Buck	Won	
2000	Independent Spirit Awards	Best Screenplay	Chuck & Buck	Nominated	
2000	Independent Spirit Awards	Best Debut Performance	Chuck & Buck	Nominated	
2002	Independent Spirit Awards	Best Screenplay	The Good Girl	Won	
2007	Independent Spirit Awards	Best Screenplay	Year of the Dog	Nominated	
2017	Independent Spirit Awards	Best Screenplay	Beatriz at Dinner	Nominated	
2022	Primetime Emmy Awards	Outstanding Limited Series	The White Lotus (season one)	Won	
2022	Primetime Emmy Awards	Outstanding Directing for a Limited Series or Movie	The White Lotus (season one)	Won	
2022	Primetime Emmy Awards	Outstanding Writing for a Limited Series or Movie	The White Lotus (season one)	Won	
2023	Primetime Emmy Awards	Outstanding Drama Series	The White Lotus (season two)	Nominated	
2023	Primetime Emmy Awards	Outstanding Directing for a Drama Series	The White Lotus (season two)	Nominated	
2023	Primetime Emmy Awards	Outstanding Writing for a Drama Series	The White Lotus (season two)	Nominated	
2025	Primetime Emmy Awards	Outstanding Drama Series	The White Lotus (season three)	Nominated	
2025	Primetime Emmy Awards	Outstanding Directing for a Drama Series	The White Lotus (season three)	Nominated	
2025	Primetime Emmy Awards	Outstanding Writing for a Drama Series	The White Lotus (season three)	Nominated	
2021	Producers Guild of America Awards	Best Limited Series – Television	The White Lotus (season one)	Nominated	
2022	Producers Guild of America Awards	Best Episodic Drama	The White Lotus (season two)	Won	
2021	Writers Guild of America Awards	Long Form – Original	The White Lotus (season one)	Nominated	
2022	Writers Guild of America Awards	Limited Series	The White Lotus (season two)	Won	
