= Michael Kang (director) =

American film director and screenwriter (born 1970)

Michael Kang (born May 3, 1970) is an American film director and screenwriter. He is Korean American and based in Los Angeles.

== Feature films ==
=== The Motel ===
His feature directorial debut was the independent movie The Motel, which premiered at the 2003 Sundance Film Festival. The Motel won the Humanitas Prize and the NHK International Filmmakers Award, as well as the top jury prizes from the San Francisco International Asian American Film Festival, the San Diego Asian Film Festival, and the VC Film Festival (the Los Angeles Asian Pacific Film Festival). Most recently, The Motel was nominated for Best First Feature Film by the Independent Spirit Awards. It is currently on DVD through Palm Pictures and stars Sung Kang.

=== West 32nd ===
Kang also directed the Korean American feature West 32nd. West 32nd premiered at the Tribeca Film Festival in 2007. The film was produced by Teddy Zee and features John Cho, Grace Park and Jeong Jun Ho.

=== Knots aka Four Wedding Planners ===
Kang's third film was the Hawaii-set romantic comedy Knots which was written by Kimberly-Rose Wolter, and stars Kimberly-Rose Walter in addition to Sung Kang, who also starred in his first film, The Motel. The film also stars Illeana Douglas, Janel Parrish and Samantha Quon. It was re-released under the title "Four Wedding Planners."

== Short films, web series and music videos ==
Kang has also directed the short films A Waiter Tomorrow (1998), a spoof on John Woo's A Better Tomorrow but set within a restaurant (which he also stars in), as well as Japanese Cowboy (2000), starring John Fukuda. Kang has also directed multiple episodes of the web series Easy to Assemble starring Illeana Douglas (who he would later collaborate with again in 4 Wedding Planners) as well as the web series Suite 7. Kang has also co-written a short film directed by Charles Mehling entitled For The First Time (2010). Michael was also a participant in the 1998 “Say Something” Virgin Cola campaign in which mostly unscripted citizens stood on soap boxes and expressed personal views. Mike politicked for more Asian men to be featured dancing in music videos. (1998)

Kang has also starred as "the Delivery Man" in Greg Pak's short film, Asian Pride Porn (2000).

Kang has also directed Emi Meyer's music video for her track, "Happy Song" in 2011.

== Accolades ==
Kang was honored with a National Endowment for the Arts Artist’s Residency Grant at the MacDowell Colony. He is recipient of the Geri Ashur Award in screenwriting through the New York Foundation for the Arts. He also received a fellowship through the ABC / DGA New Talent Television Directing Program. Kang is also a member of the Directors Guild of America.
