= Geetanjali Thapa =

Indian actress

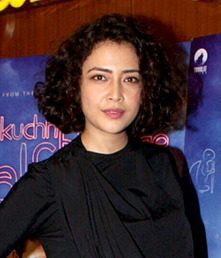
- Thapa in 2018
- Born: Gangtok, Sikkim, India
- Occupation: Actress
- Years active: 2011–present

Geetanjali Thapa is an Indian actress who primarily appears in Hindi films. She won the National Film Award for Best Actress (2013) for her performance in Liar's Dice.

== Career ==
A professional model before joining the film industry, in 2010 she made her feature film debut with Tina Ki Chaabi. Her next film, I.D., directed by Kamal KM won her best actress awards at Los Angeles Film Festival and the Madrid Film Festival. The film premiered at Busan International Film Festival and was selected for several other reputed international festivals. She starred next in Monsoon Shootout, a Hindi noir thriller by Amit Kumar, which was screened at Cannes Film Festival 2013 as part of the Midnight Screenings section, to rave reviews from several international critics. She also appeared in Anurag Kashyap's short film That Day After Everyday, which gathered over 6 million views on YouTube within weeks of release. Her next feature, Geetu Mohandas' Liar's Dice, premiered at the Mumbai Film festival in October 2013 and was screened at Sundance Film Festival and International Film Festival Rotterdam in January 2014. Geetanjali, who played the female lead won the best actress award at the 61st National Film Awards. The film was also India's official entry for the Best Foreign Language Film at the 87th Academy Awards, winning several other awards at international film festivals that year.

Thapa's latest release was Academy award winning director Danis Tanovic's Indian film, Tigers, along with Emraan Hashmi, where she plays a Pakistani woman, Zainab who is also his newly wedded wife. It was selected to screen in the Contemporary World Cinema Section at the 2014 Toronto International Film Festival. Apart from films, she has also appeared in several iconic commercials, her most recent ones including jewelry brand Tanishq and L'Oreal with Aishwarya Rai Bachchan.

In 2016, Thapa starred in the movie Land of the Gods (Dev Bhoomi), playing the role of a young progressive schoolteacher Shaanti, who wants to bring modernity to the village and emphasised on education. She also starred in Vikramaditya Motwane's survival drama Trapped, where she starred alongside Rajkummar Rao.

In 2018, she starred alongside Zain Khan Durrani in the romantic drama Kuchh Bheege Alfaaz, where she played the role of Archana Pradhan, who works in a creative agency which designs branded memes and lives life to her fullest. She also starred as Minnie Basu, in the drama film Bioscopewala, an adaptation of Tagore's Kabuliwala.

Thapa's latest release in 2019 is the American crime film, Stray Dolls, whose cast includes Olivia DeJonge and Cynthia Nixon. She currently starred for the short drama movie Frayed Lines, which is the story about two individuals who don't speak a common language but connect and take a step away from a life they have known. She plays the role of an Assamese migrant worker named Tabu.

== Personal life ==
Born and raised in Sikkim, a Himalayan state in India and did her schooling in Sikkim from Don Bosco School, Malbasey and Tashi Namgyal Academy, Gangtok and thereafter, she moved to Kolkata to pursue her graduation. She was a professional model, and won the Mega Miss North East 2007 beauty pageant held at Guwahati, Assam. before entering the film industry.

Thapa's debut short film was the English language project Myth (2006) directed by Prashant Rasaily, when she was still in school.

== Awards ==
- 2013 - Los Angeles Film Festival - Best Performance - I.D.
- 2013 - ImagineIndia Film Festival - Best Actress - I.D.
- 2013 - National Film Award for Best Actress - Liar's Dice
- 2014 - 14th New York Indian Film Festival - Best Actress - Liar's Dice
- 2019 - Tribeca Film Festival - Special Jury Mention - Stray Dolls

== Filmography ==
=== Films ===
| ‡ | Denotes films that have not yet been released |

| Year | Film | Role | Language | Notes |
|---|---|---|---|---|
| 2012 | I.D. | Charu | Hindi | Best Performance, Los Angeles Film Festival 2013; Best Actress, ImagineIndia Award 2013, Madrid |
| 2013 | Monsoon Shootout | Anu | Hindi | |
| 2013 | That Day After Every Day | Girl who hits the 'goon in the bus' | Hindi | |
| 2013 | Liar's Dice | Kamla | Hindi | National Film Award for Best Actress; Best Actress, 14th Annual New York Indian Film Festival |
| 2014 | Tigers | Zainab | Hindi-Urdu; English; German | credited as Geetanjali; 2014 Toronto International Film Festival (TIFF) |
| 2016 | Land of the Gods (Dev Bhoomi) | Shaanti | Hindi | |
| 2016 | Trapped | Noorie | Hindi | |
| 2018 | Kuchh Bheege Alfaaz | Archana Pradhan | Hindi | |
| 2018 | Painting Life | The Lady in the Guest House | English | |
| 2018 | Bioscopewala | Minnie Basu | Hindi | |
| 2019 | Stray Dolls | Riz | English | Tribeca Film Festival - Special Jury Mention |
| 2020 | Frayed Lines | Tabu | Kodava; Assamese | Short film |
| 2025 | Jaar | Thuli | Nepali | Nepali debut |

=== Web series ===
| Year | Title | Role | Network | Notes | Ref. |
|---|---|---|---|---|---|
| 2018 | Sacred Games | Nayanika Sehgal | Netflix | Season 1 | |
