= Elizabeth Cuthrell =

American film producer

- Education: University of Hawaii, Manoa; University of Pennsylvania; New York University (MFA)
- Occupation: Writer Film Producer Theater

Elizabeth Cuthrell is a writer, producer and co-founder of Evenstar Films, a New York City-based Production company. She is a member of Producers Guild of America.

== Film career ==
Elizabeth Cuthrell wrote and produced the award-winning film Jesus' Son, starring Billy Crudup, Samantha Morton, Dennis Hopper, Jack Black, Holly Hunter. Named one of the top ten films of the year by The New York Times, LA Times and CNN, Jesus' Son won many awards including The Little Golden Lion Award and The Ecumenical Award at The Venice Film Festival. The film premiered at Telluride Film Festival, Toronto Film Festival, New Directors/New Films. Cuthrell produced The Same Storm, written and directed by Peter Hedges, starring Elaine May, Mary-Louise Parker, Noma Dumezweni, Sandra Oh, Judith Light, Joel de la Fuente, Jin Ha, Moses Ingram. The film premiered at Telluride Film Festival, and won the Artios Award for casting. Cuthrell produced Kelly Reichardt's film Meek's Cutoff, starring Michelle Williams, Paul Dano, Zoe Kazan, which was in competition at the Venice Film Festival (winner, Signis Ecumenical Award), Toronto, Sundance, New York Film Festival. Cuthrell produced The Sisterhood of Night starring Kal Penn, Laura Fraser, Kara Hayward, Georgie Henley, Willa Cuthrell, Olivia DeJonge, which premiered at The Woodstock Film Festival (winner of the Tangerine Entertainment Juice Award). Cuthrell executive produced Vara: A Blessing (directed by Khyentse Norbu), which opened the Busan International Film Festival, and played festivals worldwide including the London BFI Film Festival, and the Tribeca Film Festival (winner, Best Online Feature).

=== Theater ===
Cuthrell's theater credits include: Farinelli and The King on Broadway (starring Mark Rylance and nominated for five Tony Awards including Best Play, Best Actor, Best Scenic Design, Best Costume Design and Best Lighting); the premieres of Denis Johnson's plays: Shoppers Carried by Escalators into the Flames starring Will Patton and Michael Shannon (Vineyard Theatre), Des Moines starring Michael Shannon, Hari Nef, Heather Simms, Arliss Howard, Johanna Day (Theatre For a New Audience), and Psychos Never Dream (Fine Arts Work Center, Provincetown). Other plays include the world premiere of Slut: The Play starring Samia Finnerty (Fringe NYC, Hammer Museum, Warner Theatre), Roger Rees's one-man show What You Will (ACT in San Francisco), Jonathan Cott's Walt and Emily: Between the Rooms starring Neal Huff, Birgit Huppuch (Cherry Lane Theater).

=== Public service announcements ===
Cuthrell also wrote and produced, along with Mary-Louise Parker, a series of public service announcements called Stop the Hate for the Ad Council, which urged tolerance for Arab Americans and people of color after the attacks of 9/11. For her work on Stop the Hate, Cuthrell was awarded the Courage Award, given by the Los Angeles County Human Relations Commission.

== Education ==
Cuthrell attended the University of Hawaii and the University of Pennsylvania and received her MFA from NYU's Tisch School of the Arts.
