= Eastern Institute for Integrated Learning in Management University =

Private university in Sikkim, India

- Motto: Higher Learning, higher thinking and higher education
- Type: Private university
- Active: 1995–28 April 2015
- Location: Jorethang, Sikkim, India; 27.105472°N 88.323571°E

Eastern Institute for Integrated Learning in Management University (EIILM University) was a private university located in Jorethang, Sikkim, India with another campus in Malbasey. The university has been reported by the University Grants Commission (UGC) to be non-functioning since December 2014 and was officially dissolved by the Government of Sikkim in April 2015.

== History ==
The institute was established in 1995 to provide quality and career-oriented education in India through variety of programs. In 1999 it started offering a Master of Business Administration course through Visva-Bharati University, later becoming a constituent college of the university. In 2006 it was established as a university under Sikkim State Legislature Act No 4, 2006, with the Malvika Foundation as the sponsoring body. The Act received assent of the Governor on 24 March 2006 and published under the Government of Sikkim Gazette Notification No. 28/LD/2006 dated 3 April 2006. The university was run by the Rai Foundation.

=== Invalidation of Degrees and Closure of the University ===
In 2013 the VC, chairman, registrar, and the controller of examinations were arrested by the police in Sikkim and Bengal in a case of forgery, cheating and criminal conspiracy.

According to a fact-finding committee constituted by the UGC in April 2015, EIILM University was recognized and approved by the UGC through its main campus in regular mode, but was not authorized to open study centers within or outside Sikkim. The committee concluded that all degrees beyond academic year 2009-14 are not valid. Only degrees awarded to students in four courses, i.e. B.A. (Hospitality & Tourism), BSC, BCA, B.COM and MBA till academic year 2009-14 may be valid. It further concluded that the university is not functioning since December 2014 and reports that the cabinet of Sikkim approved the dissolution of the university on 28 April 2015. Following this, a notice was published by the UGC in August 2015 cautioning students not to take admission in EIILM University. A notice by the Human Resource Development Department of the Government of Sikkim from 27 October 2015 further approved the same conclusions. In another notice, the registrar in charge appointed by the government of Sikkim has validated degrees of students who have completed their course from the Jorethang/Budang campus before dissolution. A petition (WP(C) No.33 of 2015) was filed by the Malvika Foundation and the EIILM University against the State of Sikkim to cancel the UGC notification, but the same has since been dismissed on 2 November 2016 by the Sikkim High Court.
