= Orlagh Cassidy =

American actress (born 1968)

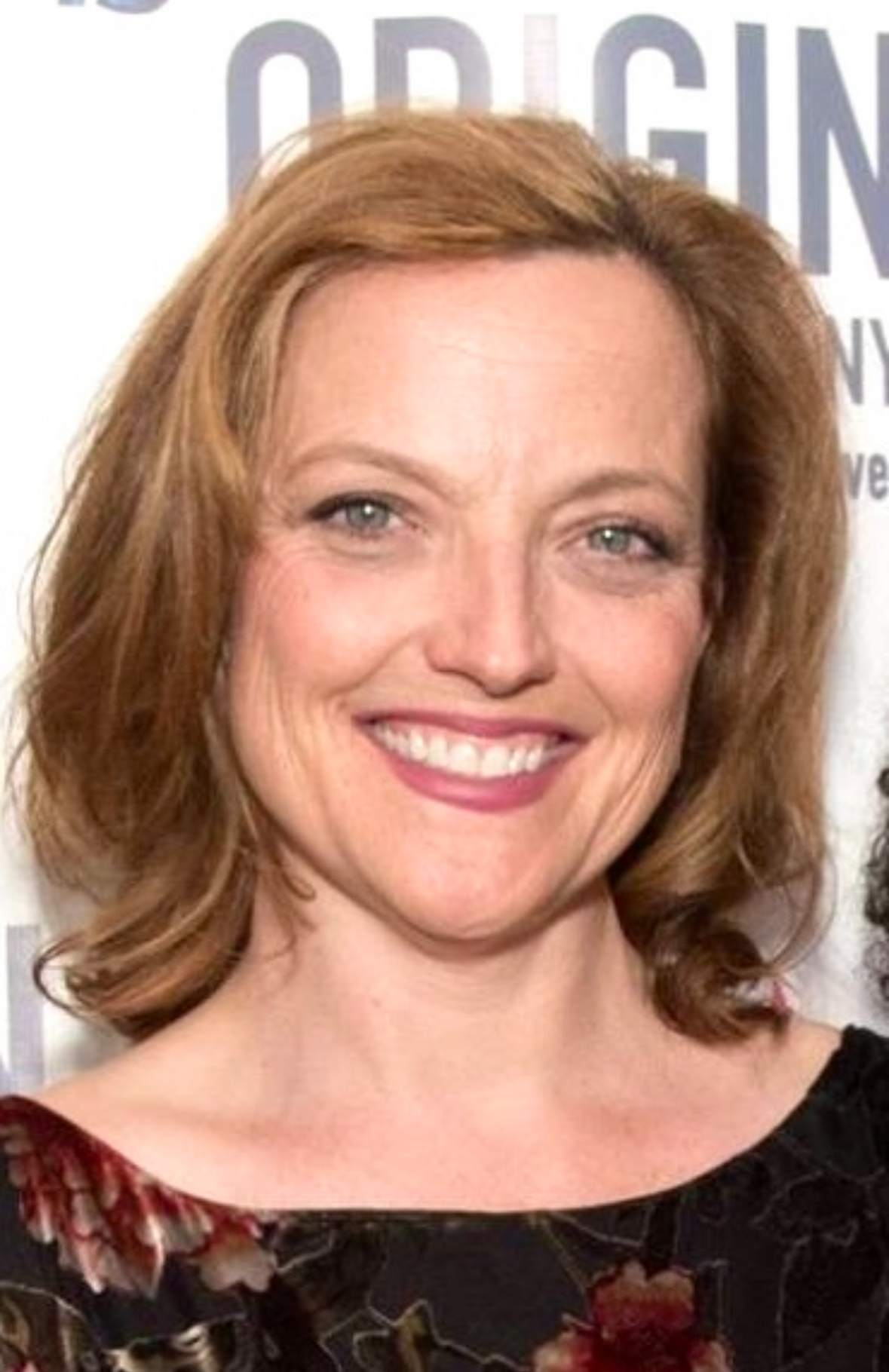
- Born: August 17, 1968 (age 58); Washington, D.C.
- Education: SUNY Purchase (BFA); National Theatre of Great Britain
- Occupations: Actress; audiobook narrator; playwright
- Years active: 1983–present
- Spouse: Nico Sidoti (m. 1995; died 2024)
- Children: 2
- Parents: Bryan Cassidy (father); Marie Cassidy (mother)

Orlagh Cassidy (born August 17, 1968) is an Irish-American actress and audiobook narrator, known for her work on stage, television, and film. She made her Broadway debut in the 1991 production of Timberlake Wertenbaker's Our Country's Good at the Nederlander Theatre. Subsequent Broadway credits include Tennessee Williams' Garden District (1995), Noël Coward's Present Laughter (1996), and Yasmina Reza's God of Carnage (2009). Additionally, Cassidy starred as Maimie Flanagan in the 2006 revival of John B. Keane's The Field at the Irish Repertory Theatre, earning a Drama Desk Award for Outstanding Actress in a Play nomination.

On television, Cassidy is best known for her portrayal of Doris Wolfe on the long-running CBS soap opera Guiding Light (1999–2009). She has had recurring roles on various primetime dramas, including Another World (1992–1993), The Sinner (2017), and Chicago Med (2025). Her film credits include Caryn Waechter's The Sisterhood of Night (2014) Josephine Decker's Shirley (2020), and Kogonada's After Yang (2021).

Also a prolific voice actress, Cassidy has narrated more than 160 audiobooks, earning 25 Earphones Awards, as well as 2 Audie Award nominations. Notable titles include Dune by Frank Herbert, The Last Unicorn by Peter S. Beagle, and Trust by Hernán Díaz, winner of the 2023 Pulitzer Prize for Fiction.

== Early life and education ==
Cassidy was born on August 17, 1968, in Washington, D. C. to Bryan Cassidy, an architect, and Dr. Marie Mullaney Cassidy, a biochemist. Both of her parents were Dublin-born Irish immigrants.

Cassidy received her BFA in Acting from SUNY Purchase, where she was known as the “Queen of Dialects.” During her studies, Cassidy earned a 1989 Princess Grace Award to study at the National Theatre of Great Britain.

== Career ==
Cassidy began her professional acting career at age fourteen, working at the Folger Theatre in Washington, D.C., where she performed the prologue in Troilus and Cressida. During the spring semester of her senior year of high school, Cassidy appeared as Peaseblossom in A Midsummer Night's Dream and, upon graduating, became an apprentice company member. During this season, she performed in eight shows a week for ten months in classics by Molière, William Shakespeare, and Anton Chekhov, appearing as Anne Page in The Merry Wives of Windsor and Anya in The Cherry Orchard.

Shortly after graduating from drama school, Cassidy made her Broadway debut in Timberlake Wertenbaker's Our Country's Good in 1991, understudying roles for Cherry Jones, Amelia Campbell, and J. Smith-Cameron. Her subsequent Broadway credits include Tennessee Williams' Garden District (1995), Noël Coward's Present Laughter (1996), and Yasmina Reza's God of Carnage (2009).

Her various Off-Broadway credits include star turns in Eric Coble's Bright Ideas at MCC Theater (2003), Jonas Hassen Khemiri's The Hundred We Are at The Cell Theatre (2015), Penelope Skinner's The Ruins of Civilization at Manhattan Theatre Club (2016), William Shakespeare's Hamlet at The Public Theater (2016), Graham Moore's Acolyte at 59E59 Theaters (2017).

A long-time company member of the Irish Repertory Theatre, her various credits include John B. Keane's The Field (2006), Brian Friel's Aristocrats (2009) and Dancing at Lughnasa (2012, 2024), Christine Evans Can't Complain (2011), and Anthony E. Palermo's It's a Wonderful Life (2017).

In early 2020 Cassidy portrayed Nancy Pelosi in the world premiere of Bill McMahon's The Adult in the Room, at Victory Gardens Theater in Chicago.

In 2023 Cassidy made her professional playwriting debut, writing and performing in the one-woman-show It's in The Play at The Cell Theatre, Off-Broadway, programmed as part of the Origin 1st Irish Theatre Festival. The production was subsequently awarded Origin's Femme First Award.

== Personal life ==
Cassidy married Nico Sidoti on September 9, 1995. Together they had two sons. Sidoti died in December 2024 from stomach cancer.

== Credits ==
=== Film ===
Year	Title	Role	Notes	Ref.
2001	Passing Stones	Shelia		
2004	The Pornographer: A Love Story	Gail		
2007	Spinning into Butter	CNN Reporter		
2008	Definitely, Maybe	Nurse		
2008	Calling it Quits	Marcy		
2014	St Vincent	Speech Therapist		
2014	Still Alice	Doctor		
2014	The Sisterhood of Night	Linda Warren		
2018	Beach House	Catherine		
2019	Catching Up	Connie Dobbs		
2020	Shirley	Caroline		
2021	After Yang	Lilian		
2021	40-Love	Mrs. Stephan		
2022	Master	Communications Director		
2022	The Pale Blue Eye	Mrs. Fry		
2024	Oh, Canada	Sarah Fife		

=== Television ===
Year	Title	Role	Notes	Ref.
1992-1993	Another World	Sloane Wallace	3 episodes	
1993	Ghostwriter	Officer Cole	2 episodes	
1996	Murder One	Gigi Fasanella	Episode: "Chapter Twenty-Two"	
1998	Trinity	Co-worker	Episode: "In Loco Parentis"	
1999-2009	Guiding Light	Doris Wolfe	Main role, 163 episodes	
2001	Sex and the City	Park Avenue Woman	Episode: "Defining Moments"	
2001-2022	Law & Order: Special Victims Unit	D.A. Cassandra Drakos	4 episodes	
2003-2024	Law & Order	Detective Shelia Ray	4 episodes	
2011	Mildred Pierce	Woman	2 episodes	
2011	A Gifted Man	Joanne	Episode: "In Case of All Hell Breaking Loose"	
2012	Blue Bloods	Anne Carter	Episode: "Some Kind of Hero"	
2013	Elementary	Maris	Episode: "The Marchioness"	
2014	Unforgettable	Shelly Miller	Episode: "The Island"	
2014	Gotham	Mrs. Lawson	Episode: "The Mask"	
2015	The Mysteries of Laura	Pamela Baker	Episode: "The Mystery of the Corner Store Crossfire"	
2015	Veep	Sally Davenport	Episode: "Election Night"	
2015	The Good Wife	Heidi	Episode: "Restraint"	
2016	Billions	Manager	Episode: "The Conversation"	
2017	Homeland	Rachel Croft	2 episodes	
2017	The Sinner	Elsa Belmont	3 episodes	
2017	Madam Secretary	Regina Boroumand	2 episodes	
2018	Random Acts of Flyness	Wife	Episode: "What are your thoughts on raising free black children?"	
2018	The Loudest Voice	Stephanie Rains	Episode: "1995"	
2018	Instinct	Margot	Episode: "Ancient History"	
2019	Venice: The Series	Holland	Main role, 8 episodes	
2020	Bull	Lisbeth Mosely	Episode: "Behind the Ivy"	
2021	City on a Hill	Folsom	Episode: "Pax Bostonia"	
2023	Nightingale	Liz Thompson	10 episodes	Podcast series
2025	Chicago Med	Miranda Lewis	3 episodes	

=== Theatre ===
Year	Title	Role	Playwright	Venue	Ref.
1983	Troilus and Cressida	Chorus	William Shakespeare	Folger Theatre, Washington, D.C.	
1985	A Midsummer Night's Dream	Peaseblossom	William Shakespeare	Folger Theatre, Washington, D.C.	
1985	Othello	Chorus	William Shakespeare	Folger Theatre, Washington, D.C.	
1986	The Cherry Orchard	Anya	Anton Chekhov	Folger Theatre, Washington, D.C.	
1986	The Merry Wives of Windsor	Anne Page	William Shakespeare	Folger Theatre, Washington, D.C.	
1991	Our Country's Good	Liz/Mary/Dabby u/s	Timberlake Wertenbaker	Nederlander Theatre, Broadway	
1994	Richard III	Lady Anne	William Shakespeare	Hartford Stage	
1995	Of Mice and Men	Curly's Wife	John Steinbeck	Philadelphia Drama Guild	
1995	Garden District	Catharine Holly u/s	Tennessee Williams	Circle in the Square Theatre, Broadway	
1996–1997	Present Laughter	Joanna Lyppiatt	Noël Coward	Walter Kerr Theatre, Broadway	
2003	Bright Ideas	Denise	Eric Coble	MCC Theater, Off-Broadway	
2006	The Field	Maimie Flanagan	John B. Keane	Irish Repertory Theatre, Off-Broadway	
2009	Aristocrats	Alice	Brian Friel	Irish Repertory Theatre, Off-Broadway	
2009–2010	God of Carnage	Annette/Veronica u/s	Yasmina Reza	Bernard B. Jacobs Theatre, Broadway	
2011	God of Carnage	Annette/Veronica u/s	Yasmina Reza	Center Theatre Group/Mark Taper Forum	
2011–2012	Dancing at Lughnasa	Kate Mundy	Brian Friel	Irish Repertory Theatre, Off-Broadway	
2014	When We Were Young And Unafraid	Agnes u/s	Sarah Treem	Manhattan Theatre Club, Off-Broadway	
2016	The Hundred We Are	2	Jonas Hassen Khemiri	The Cell Theatre, Off-Broadway	
2016	The Ruins of Civilization	Joy	Penelope Skinner	Manhattan Theatre Club, Off-Broadway	
2016	Hamlet	Gertrude	William Shakespeare	The Public Theater, Off-Broadway	
2017	Acolyte	Ayn Rand	Graham Moore	59E59 Theaters, Off-Broadway	
2017	It's A Wonderful Life	Various	Anthony E. Palermo	Irish Repertory Theatre, Off-Broadway	
2020	The Adult in the Room	Nancy Pelosi	Bill McMahon	Victory Gardens Theater, Chicago	
2023	It's in The Play	Various	Orlagh Cassidy	The Cell Theatre, Off-Broadway	
2024	Dancing at Lughnasa	Kate Mundy	Brian Friel	Irish Repertory Theatre, Off-Broadway	

=== Video Games ===
Year	Title	Role	Notes	Ref.
2026	Grand Theft Auto VI	Lori Heder		

== Awards ==
- 2007 Drama Desk Award for Outstanding Actress in a Play nomination
- 1989 Princess Grace Award
