= Olivia DeJonge =

Australian actress (born 1998)

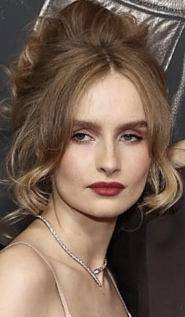
- DeJonge at Elvis premiere in 2022
- Born: 30 April 1998 (age 28); Melbourne, Victoria, Australia
- Occupation: Actress
- Years active: 2011–present

Olivia DeJonge (/diˈɒŋ/; born 30 April 1998) is an Australian actress. On television, she is known for her roles in the ABC1 series Hiding (2015) and the Netflix series The Society (2019), and films include The Visit (2015), Better Watch Out (2016), and Elvis (2022). For portraying Priscilla Presley in the latter, she won the AACTA Award for Best Supporting Actress.

== Early life and education ==
DeJonge was born on 30 April 1998 in Melbourne, Victoria, the elder of two children of Robyn (née Gradisen) and Rob DeJonge. Her parents are investors in the property and IT sectors. She spent her early years in Rochester Terrace, a heritage-listed townhouse in St Vincent Place, Albert Park.

In October 2003, she moved to Perth, Western Australia with her parents at the age of five, where she was enrolled at Presbyterian Ladies' College, and lived in Peppermint Grove, in the same suburb of Perth as the school.

When she was just eight, she was employed to do a radio voiceover for a well-known chain of hardware stores, which led to many further radio advertisements over her career.

== Career ==
In 2010, DeJonge played the lead role in Maziar Lahooti's short film Good Pretender, for which she won Best Actress in the 24th West Australian Screen Awards in 2010.

In 2014, DeJonge made her feature film debut in the film The Sisterhood of Night; she starred along with Georgie Henley, Kara Hayward, and Kal Penn. Caryn Waechter directed the film, which was released on 10 April 2015, after getting a premiere in October 2014.

In 2015, DeJonge appeared in the Australian ABC's television drama series Hiding, on which she played one of the lead roles as Tara Swift / Shaneen Quigg. She played the co-lead role of Becca in the horror film The Visit, along with Ed Oxenbould. M. Night Shyamalan directed the film, which had its premiere on 31 August 2015, and was released on 11 September 2015 by Universal Pictures. In 2017, DeJonge starred as Alice Burbage in the TNT series, Will.

DeJonge played Priscilla Presley in Baz Luhrmann's 2022 Elvis Presley biopic Elvis. She drew praise from critics, who applauded her ability to match co-star Austin Butler's charisma. She won the AACTA Award for Best Supporting Actress for this role.

== Personal life ==
DeJonge lives in Melbourne.

== Filmography ==
=== Film ===
Year	Title	Role	Notes
2011	Good Pretender	Ally	Short film
2012	Polarised	Beth	Short film
2012	Eleven Thirty	Sally	Short film
2014	The Sisterhood of Night	Lavinia Hall	
2015	The Visit	Becca Jamison	
2016	Scare Campaign	Abby	
2016	Better Watch Out	Ashley	
2018	Undertow	Angie	
2018	Love and Other Places	Shaz	Short film
2019	Stray Dolls	Dallas	
2019	Josie & Jack	Josie Raeburn	
2022	Elvis	Priscilla Presley	

=== Television ===
Year	Title	Role	Notes
2015	Hiding	Shaneen Quigg / Tara Swift	Main role; 8 episodes
2017	Will	Alice Burbage	Main role; 10 episodes
2019	The Society	Elle Tomkins	Main role; 10 episodes
2022	The Staircase	Caitlin Atwater	Main role; mini-series; 6 episodes
2025	The Narrow Road to the Deep North	Ella	Main role; mini-series; 2 episodes

== Awards and nominations ==
Year	Award	Result
2010	Best Actress, West Australian Screen Awards, for Good Pretender	Won
2015	Young Artist Award, for The Visit	Nominated
2022	AACTA Award for Best Supporting Actress in Film, for Elvis	Won
