= Hyde Park Entertainment =

American film production company founded in 1999

- Trade name: Hyde Park Entertainment Group
- Type: Private
- Industry: Distribution; Finance; Film; Television
- Predecessors: Mandeville Films (pre-1999)
- Founded: July 26, 1999; 27 years ago
- Founders: Ashok Amritraj; David Hoberman
- Headquarters: Ventura Boulevard, Sherman Oaks, California, United States
- Key people: Ashok Amritraj (chairman and CEO) Carl Clifton (president) Priya Amritraj (head of Film and TV)
- Products: Motion pictures; Television
- Divisions: Hyde Park International
- Website: hydeparkentertainment.com

Hyde Park Entertainment is an independent distribution and finance company, as well as a film and television production company that was founded by both Ashok Amritraj and David Hoberman in July 26, 1999.

== History ==
On July 26, 1999, Ashok Amritraj, co-founder of Franchise Pictures, together with David Hoberman, founder of Mandeville Films, founded Hyde Park Entertainment, with funds of $200 million and a slate of six pictures. The title came from Hyde Park, London. The startup company signed a first-look deal with Metro-Goldwyn-Mayer (MGM), with a second look deal at The Walt Disney Studios, both of them were on non-exclusive agreements. Mandeville initially went inactive.

On August 12, 1999, Eureka, a consortium of Kirch Group and Mediaset signed a distribution deal with Hyde Park Entertainment for the distribution of titles and invested in the home video, television and theatrical distribution rights of its titles. By December 12, 2000, the company signed a deal with Nordisk Film to handle titles for the European market.

In 2002, David Hoberman left the company so the company was allowed to reopen the initially-inactive Mandeville Films at the Walt Disney Studios. By that year, Jon Jashni became the company's president. In 2003, the company attempted to enter television production, but it never materialized. After a string of box-office flops, the company scored its first hit with Bringing Down the House.

On July 27, 2005, Hyde Park ended its deal with MGM after Sony purchased the studio and agreed to a co-financing and production deal with 20th Century Fox. In 2007, the company entered into Indian-language production with a deal with Adlabs Films, and a year later, the company is setting up its Asian fund with $74 million. On November 2, 2008, the company set up a deal with Image Nation Abu Dhabi to co-finance films with global apparel.

In 2011, the company partnered with China's Angel Wings Entertainment to co-fund pictures, as well as a deal with National Geographic to partner in various feature films.

In 2022, Hyde Park and Warner Music Entertainment launched the Hyde Park Entertainment and Warner Music Entertainment Asian Women Fellowship, in partnership with Film Independent, which will showcase women-identifying writers and writer-directors who are Asian or part of the Asian Diaspora. The Fellowship is aligned with Hyde Park and Warner Music Group's shared, ongoing commitment to diversity and inclusion.

The recently announced Hyde Park Asia slate includes the Pulitzer Prize runner-up Maximum City to be directed by Anurag Kashyap and the best-selling novel Paradise Towers with filmmaker Zoya Akhtar.

== Production filmography ==
=== 2000's ===
Title	Release date	Distributor	Notes	Budget	Gross
Antitrust	January 12, 2001	MGM Distribution Co.	co-production with Industry Entertainment, Epsilon Motion Pictures and Metro-Goldwyn-Mayer	$30 million	$18.2 million
What's the Worst That Could Happen?	June 1, 2001	MGM Distribution Co.	co-production with Turman-Morrisey Company and Metro-Goldwyn-Mayer	$60 million	$38.4 million
Original Sin	August 3, 2001	MGM Distribution Co.	co-production with Metro-Goldwyn-Mayer	$26–42 million	$35.4 million
Bandits	October 23, 2001	MGM Distribution Co.	co-production with Epsilon Motion Pictures, Empire Pictures, Baltimore Pictures, Spring Creek Productions, Cheyenne Enterprises and Metro-Goldwyn-Mayer	$75 million	$67.6 million
Moonlight Mile	October 4, 2002	Buena Vista Pictures	co-production with Epsilon Motion Pictures, Reveal Entertainment, Gran Via Productions and Touchstone Pictures	$21 million	$10 million
Bringing Down the House	March 7, 2003	Buena Vista Pictures	co-production with Mandeville Films and Touchstone Pictures	$33 million	$164.7 million
Walking Tall	April 2, 2004	MGM Distribution Co.	co-production with Mandeville Films, Burke/Samples/Foster Productions, WWE Films and Metro-Goldwyn-Mayer	$46 million	$57.2 million
Raising Helen	May 28, 2004	Buena Vista Pictures	co-production with Beacon Pictures, Mandeville Films and Touchstone Pictures	$50 million	$49.7 million
Shopgirl	October 21, 2005	Buena Vista Pictures	co-production with Epsilon Motion Pictures and Touchstone Pictures; international distribution through 20th Century Fox	N/A	$11.7 million
Dreamer	October 21, 2005	DreamWorks Distribution LLC	co-production with Tollin/Robbins Productions, Epsilon Motion Pictures and DreamWorks Pictures	$32 million	$39.5 million
The Astronaut Farmer	February 23, 2007	Warner Bros. Pictures	international distribution only; produced by Spring Creek Pictures and Polish Brothers Construction	$13 million	$11.1 million
Premonition	March 16, 2007	Sony Pictures Releasing	co-production with TriStar Pictures, Metro-Goldwyn-Mayer, Epsilon Motion Pictures and Offspring Entertainment	$20 million	$84.1 million
Death Sentence	August 31, 2007	20th Century Fox	co-production with Baldwin Entertainment Group	$10 million	$17 million
Battle in Seattle	September 8, 2007	Redwood Palms Pictures	co-production with Grosvenor Park	$10 million	$886,461
Trade	September 28, 2007	Roadside Attractions	uncredited; co-production with Centropolis Entertainment and VIP Medienfonds	N/A	$1.5 million
Trick 'r Treat	December 9, 2007	Warner Premiere	uncredited; co-production with Legendary Pictures and Bad Hat Harry Productions	$12 million	$27,909
Flawless	March 28, 2008	Magnolia Pictures	co-production with Pierce/Williams Entertainment, Delux Productions, Future Films, Luxembourg Film Fund, Blue Rider Entertainment and Zero Gravity Management	$20 million	$6.8 million
The Children of Huang Shi	April 3, 2008	Sony Pictures Classics	international distribution only; co-production with Screen Australia, Ming Productions, Zero West Filmproduktion, Cheerland Entertainment and Bluewater Pictures	$40 million	$8.2 million
Asylum	July 15, 2008	20th Century Fox Home Entertainment	co-production with Metro-Goldwyn-Mayer and Mad Scientist Productions	$10 million	N/A
Traitor	August 27, 2008	Overture Films	co-production with Crescendo Productions and Mandeville Films; international distribution by Paramount Vantage	$22 million	$27.6 million
The Other End of the Line	October 31, 2008	MGM Distribution Co.	co-production with Adlabs and Metro-Goldwyn-Mayer	$2.5 million	$507,534
Street Fighter: The Legend of Chun-Li	February 27, 2009	20th Century Fox	co-production with Capcom and Adlabs Films	$50 million	$12.8 million
Echelon Conspiracy	February 27, 2009	After Dark Films	international distribution only; co-production with Dark Castle Entertainment, Mobicom Entertainment and Zinc Entertainment	N/A	$2.1 million
The City of Your Final Destination	March 21, 2009	Screen Media Films	co-production with Merchant Ivory Productions	$8.3 million	$1.4 million
Dark Country	October 6, 2009	Sony Pictures Home Entertainment	co-production with Stage 6 Films	$5 million	N/A

=== 2010's ===
Title	Release date	Distributor	Notes	Budget	Gross
Machete	September 3, 2010	20th Century Fox	co-production with Overnight Films and Troublemaker Studios	$10.5 million	$45.5 million
Leonie	November 20, 2010	Vertigo Films		N/A	N/A
Blue Valentine	December 29, 2010	The Weinstein Company	international sales only; co-production with Hunting Lane Films and Silverwood Films	$1 million	$16.6 million
Dylan Dog: Dead of Night	April 29, 2011	Omni/Freestyle Releasing	co-production with Omnilab Media Group and Platinum Studios, Inc.	$20 million	$5.8 million
Our Idiot Brother	August 26, 2011	The Weinstein Company	international sales only; co-production with Big Beach Films and Likely Story	$5 million	$25.9 million
The Double	October 28, 2011	Image Entertainment	co-production with Imagenation Abu Dhabi	$13 million	$4.7 million
Ghost Rider: Spirit of Vengeance	February 17, 2012	Sony Pictures Releasing	co-production with Columbia Pictures, Marvel Entertainment, Crystal Sky Pictures and Imagenation Abu Dhabi	$57 million	$132.6-149.4 million
Legends of Oz: Dorothy's Return	May 9, 2014	Clarius Entertainment	international sales only; produced by Prana Studios and Summertime Entertainment	$70 million	$21.7 million
Life of Crime	August 29, 2014	Roadside Attractions	co-production with Image Nation Abu Dhabi, The Gotham Group, StarStream Entertainment and Abbolita Productions	$12 million	$1.5 million
Skin Trade	May 8, 2015	Magnet Releasing	co-production with SC Films Thailand, BMP Productions and Thor Pictures	$9 million	N/A
Every Secret Thing	May 15, 2015	Starz Digital	co-production with Likely Story, Merced Media Partners and PalmStar Media Capital	N/A	$103,536
The Journey Home	September 4, 2015	Image Entertainment	co-production with Entertainment One, Original Pictures and Image Nation	N/A	N/A
99 Homes	October 9, 2015	Broad Green Pictures	co-production with Image Nation, Noruz Films and Treehouse Pictures	$8 million	$1.9 million
The Young Messiah	March 11, 2016	Focus Features	co-production with 1492 Pictures, CJ Entertainment and Ocean Blue Entertainment	$18.5 million	$7.3 million
Term Life	April 29, 2016	Focus World	uncredited; co-production with PalmStar Entertainment, WWE Studios and Wild West Picture Show Productions	N/A	$89,546
Careful What You Wish For	June 10, 2016	Starz Digital	co-production with Troika Pictures, Amasia Entertainment, Roberi Media, Image Nation, Merced Media Partners and Myriad Pictures	$4.5 million	N/A
Ordinary World	October 14, 2016	Universal Pictures	international sales only; produced by Let It Play and Process Media	N/A	N/A
Eloise	February 3, 2017	Vertical Entertainment	international sales only; co-production with SLAM Productions, Palm Drive Productions and Vinson Films	N/A	N/A
Killing Hasselhoff	August 29, 2017	Universal Pictures Home Entertainment	co-production with WWE Studios, Image Nation Abu Dhabi, Lotus Pictures, Intellectual Artists Management and Primary Wave Entertainment	N/A	N/A
Louder Together	September 13, 2017	Go90	co-production with Global Citizen and Riot House	N/A	N/A
Cold Moon	October 6, 2017	Uncork'd Entertainment	international sales only; produced by Curmudgeon Films, ALLaBorde Films and Highland Film Group	N/A	N/A
The Female Brain	February 9, 2018	IFC Films	international sales only; produced by Black Bicycle Entertainment and Night and Day Films	N/A	$19,225
The Seagull	May 11, 2018	Sony Pictures Classics	international sales only; produced by Mar-Key Pictures and KGB Media	N/A	$1.5 million
The Bromley Boys	June 1, 2018	Miracle Communications Ltd.	international sales only; produced by Itchy Fish Film, Scanner-Rhodes Productions and Warrior Film Promotions	N/A	N/A
An L.A. Minute	August 24, 2018	Strand Releasing	international sales only; produced by Existential Crisis and Spiderworx Media	N/A	N/A
Back Roads	December 7, 2018	Samuel Goldwyn Films	international sales only; produced by Upturn Productions, Infinity Films and Back Roads Productions Ltd	N/A	N/A
Deadcon	June 15, 2019	N/A	uncredited; co-production with Gunpowder & Sky	N/A	N/A
The Curse of Buckout Road	September 27, 2019	Vertical Entertainment	international sales only; produced by Trimuse Entertainment Inc.	N/A	N/A
Prey	September 27, 2019	Cinedigm	co-production with Blumhouse Productions, Tremendum Pictures and Image Nation	N/A	N/A
Rose Plays Julie	October 3, 2019	Twelve Oaks Pictures	international sales only; produced by Samson Films, Desperate Optimists and Screen Ireland	N/A	N/A

=== 2020's ===
Title	Release date	Distributor	Notes	Budget	Gross
Lapsis	February 12, 2021	Film Movement	international sales only; produced by Couple 3 Films and Purple & Gold Productions	N/A	N/A
It Takes Three	September 23, 2021	N/A	uncredited; co-production with Gunpowder & Sky	N/A	N/A
Our Almost Completely True Love Story	March 23, 2021	N/A	international sales only; produced by Long Story Short Pictures, Painted Guitar, Rounding Third Films and Silent Crow Arts	N/A	N/A
Marianne	November 28, 2023	N/A	international sales only; produced by Cine@ and Dark Dreams Entertainment	N/A	N/A
Poison	July 5, 2024	Paradiso Entertainment	international sales only; produced by Deal Productions, Phanta Film and Studio Hamburg UK	N/A	N/A

=== In development ===
Title	Distributor	Notes
Arthur Ashe	TBA	
The Man Who Lived Underground	TBA	
Bury the Lede	TBA	
Dinner with Audrey	TBA	
The Light We Lost	TBA	
Proxy	TBA	
