= The Sisterhood of Night =

The Sisterhood of the Night
- Theatrical release poster
- Directed by: Caryn Waechter
- Screenplay by: Marilyn Fu
- Based on: "The Sisterhood of Night" by Steven Millhauser
- Produced by: Lydia Dean Pilcher; Elizabeth Cuthrell
- Starring: Georgie Henley; Kara Hayward; Kal Penn; Laura Fraser; Willa Cuthrell; Olivia DeJonge; Jessica Hecht
- Cinematography: Zak Mulligan
- Edited by: Aaron Yanes
- Music by: The Crystal Method; Tobias Enhus
- Production companies: Evenstar Films; Cine Mosaic
- Distributed by: Freestyle Releasing
- Release dates: October 18, 2014 (Woodstock); April 10, 2015 (United States)
- Running time: 104 minutes
- Country: United States
- Language: English
- Budget: $1 million
- Box office: $6,870

The Sisterhood of Night is a 2014 American mystery thriller film directed by Caryn Waechter from a screenplay by Marilyn Fu, based on a 1994 short story by Steven Millhauser. The film premiered at the 2014 Woodstock Film Festival. It was released in select theaters and through video on demand on April 10, 2015, by Freestyle Releasing.

== Plot ==
In Kingston, New York, Emily Parris decides to get back at classmate, Mary Warren, for ruining her school play audition. While Mary holds her audition, Emily steals her phone and publishes all of Mary's texts on her blog. Mary retaliates by calling Emily a "blog whore" in front of the whole school, which lands both girls a meeting with the guidance counselor, Gordy Gambhir, in his office.

Later that night, Mary writes on Facebook that she will be taking a "vow of silence" and deletes her social media accounts. She forms the idea to create a "Sisterhood", and recruits classmates Catherine Huang and Lavinia Hall as its first members. Together, the three girls venture into the forest at night, beginning their ritual.

By the following school year, the Sisterhood has become common knowledge among school and all girls wish to join. However, no one knows what the group ritual is due to a vow of silence each member takes. New members are chosen by Mary and given a paper square as an invite. Emily, upset about being rejected, follows the girls into the woods and hides as the group ritual begins. While snapping a photo, she gets spotted by Mary.

The scene cuts to her in her bedroom, posting a new blog post. The post describes how she heard the girls chant dirty things, perform sexual acts on each other, and claims they cut her hand with a knife before molesting her. Later, Emily runs into Mary during Mass at church and makes a scene in front of everyone before fainting. However, Mary simply declares she will never be in the Sisterhood.

Mary, Catherine, Lavinia, and the rest of the Sisterhood uphold their vow of silence when parents, teachers, and reporters ask about the Sisterhood activities. Lavinia's mother, Rose, searches Lavinia's room and discovers a doll with a pentagram-like symbol drawn on it. After Lavinia returns home, she is confronted by her mother, who finds the same symbol tattooed on her stomach. Two more girls come forward and claim the Sisterhood girls molested them as well, causing more public hysteria. Emily and the two girls come up with a plan to get the fragile Lavinia to make a confession about the Sisterhood.

The same night, Mary finds herself alone while trying to avoid being caught for skipping curfew. She goes to see her boyfriend, Jeff, but he refuses to talk to her. She goes to Gambhir's house to confide in him, unaware they are being observed by Sue Parris, Emily's mother. She snaps a picture of them and, assuming they're in a sexual relationship, sends the photo out. Mary spends the night on his couch before being awoken by her mother the following morning, who saw the photo. Gambhir is fired from his teaching job, even after he and Mary insist nothing inappropriate happened.

Feeling that things are spinning out of control, Catherine and Lavinia try to convince Mary to tell everyone the truth of the Sisterhood, but Mary promises that she'll fix it. At a small press conference, Mary tries to talk to parents and reporters to dispel the situation. Despite her efforts, Mary is unable to settle the scandal as Gambhir defends the girls.

Mary fashions the now-infamous Sisterhood paper square and gives it to Gambhir, inviting him to see their ritual. After getting Rose to come with him, they watch as the girls stand in a circle around a fire, share their personal thoughts out loud before burning pieces of paper with their written secrets. Through a montage of Sisterhood meetings, Catherine and Mary reveal their biggest secrets; Catherine misses her mother (who is implied to have cancer and undergoing treatment) and wishes she would die or get better, Mary wants to lose her virginity to someone she loves and Lavinia fears never being kissed.

Emily, invited to speak on a radio show about sexual abuse, begins to feel guilt and decides to pull out of her plan to ambush Lavinia with her two friends. The two girls are dismayed, deciding to go ahead with the plan without her. Emily tries to warn Lavinia, but it's too late. Lavinia has been lured into the woods by Travis, a boy she has a crush on. In the woods, Travis convinces her to take her shirt off, and she is ambushed by Emily's friends. While filming her, they hold her down while putting a witch hat on her, force her to say the Sisterhood girls are witches, and make her touch herself. They upload the video to the Internet, drug Lavinia, and take her to a Halloween party. At the party, they spread the video around while calling Lavinia cruel names. A now emotionally broken Lavinia commits suicide by overdosing on her mother's pills.

During Lavinia's funeral, Mary, knowing Lavinia's last wish was to be kissed, asks Jeff to do so out of respect. A distraught Emily confesses that she made the whole thing up. She admits how she wanted to be in the Sisterhood so badly, she was outraged when Mary rejected her and lied about their activities as revenge. She then begs for forgiveness. Emily, whose blog is revealed to be a hoax, is persecuted by those who hate her for the damage she caused. However, others focus on how she still helped sexual abuse victims despite the false pretense that made her blog popular.

Catherine shaves off her hair and finally visits her sick mother while Mary and Jeff reconcile their differences. She and Catherine decide to do a dance they had prepared for school, choreographed to Lavinia's original music, and proceed to dance through town in Lavinia's memory as local residents watch them. Emily stands nearby and Mary approaches her, giving her the Sisterhood paper square and inviting her to join their dance. Emily happily accepts and the Sisterhood girls dance down the streets of Kingston and into the woods.

The movie ends with a narrative about how the Sisterhood will continue to be a secret to outsiders and the secret will be passed down to new members and soon disappear into the darkness.

== Cast ==
- Georgie Henley as Mary Warren, the leader of the Sisterhood and free spirit who clashes with Emily
- Kara Hayward as Emily Parris, a teenaged blogger who is jealous and considers Mary her rival
- Kal Penn as Gordy Gambhir, the school guidance counselor
- Laura Fraser as Rose Hall, Lavinia's single mother and the school librarian
- Willa Cuthrell as Catherine Huang, an original member of the Sisterhood and one of Mary's best friends
- Olivia DeJonge as Lavinia Hall, a shy girl and an original member of the Sisterhood
- Jessica Hecht as Sue Parris, Emily's mother
- Neal Huff as Tom Parris, Emily's father
- Gary Wilmes as Principal Harvey
- Louis Ozawa Changchien as Stanley Huang, Catherine's father
- Morgan Turner as Sarah Burhnardt, one of Emily's co-conspirators
- Orlagh Cassidy as Linda Warren, Mary's mother
- Evan Kuzma as Jeff Johns, a photography buff to whom Mary is attracted
- Juliana Sass as Hilda Meyer, an early initiate into the Sisterhood
- Deema Aitken as Travis Brody, the popular boy Lavinia has a crush on
- Hannah Munson as Jennifer, the troubled teen who reaches out to Emily for help

== Reception ==
Many critics highlighted Georgie Henley's performance in the film, commenting that she has come a long way from her role as Lucy Pevensie in The Chronicles of Narnia. Inkoo Kang of TheWrap wrote in her review that "there's no dethroning Henley as the film's queen bee, with the Chronicles of Narnia actress doing a pretty good impersonation of Foxfire-era Angelina Jolie: sexy but open-faced, curious but scheming, intimidating but inviting."

On review aggregator Rotten Tomatoes, the film holds an approval rating of 80% based on 20 reviews, with an average rating of 6.55/10
