= Stray Dolls =

- Film poster
- Directed by: Sonejuhi Sinha
- Written by: Sonejuhi Sinha; Charlotte Rabate
- Produced by: Charlotte Rabate; Sonejuhi Sinha; Edward Parks
- Starring: Geetanjali Thapa; Olivia DeJonge; Cynthia Nixon; Robert Aramayo; Samrat Chakrabarti
- Cinematography: Shane Sigler
- Edited by: J.D. Smyth
- Production company: Om Films
- Distributed by: Samuel Goldwyn Films
- Release date: April 27, 2019 (Tribeca Film Festival)
- Running time: 97 minutes
- Country: United States
- Language: English

Stray Dolls is a 2019 American crime film directed by Sonejuhi Sinha and written by Sonejuhi Sinha and Charlotte Rabate. The film stars Geetanjali Thapa, Olivia DeJonge, Cynthia Nixon, Robert Aramayo and Samrat Chakrabarti.

== Cast ==
- Geetanjali Thapa as Riz
- Olivia DeJonge as Dallas
- Cynthia Nixon as Una
- Robert Aramayo as Jimmy
- Samrat Chakrabarti as Sal
- Rosemary Howard as Doreen
- John Schiappa as Floyd
- Kelvin McGrue as Mikey
- Yvette Lashawn Williams as Peaches
- Puy Navarro as Sandy

== Release ==
The film premiered at the Tribeca Film Festival on April 27, 2019. On September 23, 2019, Samuel Goldwyn Films acquired distribution rights to the film. It was scheduled to be released on April 10, 2020.

== Reception ==
On review aggregator website Rotten Tomatoes, the film holds an approval rating of 71% based on 24 reviews, with an average rating of 6.3/10. The site's critical consensus reads, "Stray Dolls doesn't make it easy to identify with its central characters, but director/co-writer Sonejuhi Sinha's depiction of the American underbelly is compelling." On Metacritic, the film has a weighted average score of 58 out of 100 based on 8 reviews, indicating "generally favorable reviews".

Jessica Kiang of Variety magazine called Stray Dolls "stylish" and "seemingly seductive". Justin Lowe of The Hollywood Reporter called the film "alternately incisive and uneven", while Jeannette Catsoulis of The New York Times said that "despite its sense of dead-end desperation, [the film] is made worthwhile by the richness of Shane Sigler's nighttime cinematography and the consistent empathy of its tone".
