= Beach House (2018 film) =

- Poster
- Directed by: Jason Saltiel
- Written by: Jason Saltiel; Matt Simon
- Produced by: Matt Simon
- Starring: Willa Fitzgerald; Murray Bartlett; Orlagh Cassidy; Tom Hammond
- Cinematography: Andreas von Scheele
- Music by: Jason Saltiel
- Distributed by: Archstone Distribution
- Release date: June 22, 2018
- Running time: 86 minutes
- Country: United States
- Language: English

Beach House is a 2018 American thriller film written by Jason Saltiel and Matt Simon, directed by Saltiel and starring Willa Fitzgerald, Murray Bartlett, Orlagh Cassidy and Tom Hammond.

== Cast ==
- Willa Fitzgerald as Emma
- Murray Bartlett as Paul
- Orlagh Cassidy as Catherine
- Tom Hammond as Henry

== Release ==
The film was released on June 22, 2018.

== Reception ==
The film has a 25% rating on Rotten Tomatoes based on eight reviews. Susan Wloszczyna of RogerEbert.com awarded the film two stars out of four. Chuck Foster of Film Threat awarded the film three stars out of ten.

Frank Scheck of The Hollywood Reporter gave the film a negative review and wrote as a bottom line: “Pass up the invitation.”
