= Deadcon =

- Directed by: Caryn Waechter
- Written by: Scotty Landes
- Produced by: Ashok Amritraj; Jack Ferry; Jude Harris; Scotty Landes; Van Toffler; Cody Zwieg
- Starring: Lauren Elizabeth; Claudia Sulewski; Keith Machekanyanga; Mimi Gianopulos; Lukas Gage; Carl Gilliard
- Cinematography: Nicole Hirsch Whitaker
- Edited by: Robin Gonsalves; Blake Harjes
- Music by: Das Mörtal
- Production company: Gunpowder & Sky
- Release date: 15 June 2019 (Cinepocalypse Film Festival)
- Running time: 78 minutes
- Country: United States
- Language: English

Deadcon is a 2019 American horror film directed by Caryn Waechter, starring Lauren Elizabeth, Claudia Sulewski, Keith Machekanyanga, Mimi Gianopulos, Lukas Gage and Carl Gilliard.

== Cast ==
- Lauren Elizabeth as Ashley
- Claudia Sulewski as Megan
- Keith Machekanyanga as Dave
- Mimi Gianopulos as Kara
- Lukas Gage as Ricky
- Carl Gilliard as Warren
- Caeli as herself
- Mark Dohner as himself
- Jessie Paege as herself
- Richard Kohnke as Larry
- Dominic Burgess as Stanley
- Brian Kimmet as Clerk
- Aaron Hendry as John Althaus

== Release ==
The film premiered at the Cinepocalypse Film Festival on 15 June 2019.

== Reception ==
Film critic Kim Newman wrote that Waechter "has an insteresting take on subject matter" and praised the "especially effective" score and sound design.

Chloe Leeson of Screen Queens called the script a "tired mish-mash of overused genre moments and doesn’t attempt to add any critique (or even praise) on this generation’s interest in the internet and the lengths people will go to for views or popularity."

Patrick Bromley of Bloody Disgusting gave the film a score of 2/5 and wrote that while the film is "put together well", it "squanders the opportunity to provide any commentary on its subject matter."

Adam Patterson of Film Pulse gave the film a score of 3.5/10 and called it a "mediocre thrill ride that annoys more than it entertains."
