= Kuchh Bheege Alfaaz =

2018 film directed by Onir

- Official poster
- Directed by: Onir
- Screenplay by: Abhishek Chatterjee
- Story by: Abhishek Chatterjee
- Produced by: Vikram Mehra; SIddharth Anand Kumar
- Starring: Geetanjali Thapa; Zain Khan Durrani; Shray Tiwari
- Cinematography: Nusrat F. Jafri
- Edited by: Irene Dhar Malik
- Music by: Shashwat Srivastava
- Release date: 16 February 2018
- Country: India
- Language: Hindi

Kuchh Bheege Alfaaz (transl. Some rain-drenched words) is an Indian Hindi language romantic drama film directed by Onir. The film stars Geetanjali Thapa and marks the debut of Zain Khan Durrani. The movie is produced by Yoodlee Films, a venture of Saregama. The film was released on 16 February 2018.

== Synopsis ==
Every night at 10, Kolkata tunes into radio to listen to 'Kuchh Bheege Alfaaz' – an episodic series of unrequited love stories hosted by RJ Alfaz who, despite his tremendous following, prefers staying detached and anonymous. Among his many fans is the boisterous Archana (Geetanjali Thapa), a girl working at a creative agency – which designs branded memes. She is leukodermic but lives life to the fullest. They meet; or rather talk, for the first time over a misplaced call when Archana accidentally dials Alfaaz's (Zain Khan Durrani) number, while trying to connect with her latest blind date. Thus begins an interesting relationship between two unlikely characters, one overly compensating, but in denial of her present, and the other buried under a dark secret of his past.

== Cast ==
- Geetanjali Thapa as Archana Pradhan
- Zain Khan Durrani as Alfaaz
- Shray Rai Tiwari as Apu Khandelwal
- Mona Ambegaonkar as Jayashree Pradhan
- Chandreyee Ghosh as Priyanka
- Saheb Bhattacharjee as Partho
- Saurav Das as Tony Baby
- Debopriyo as Naren
- Sahil Agarwal as Kushal
- Soumya Mukherjee as Param
- Shankhu Karmakar as Lady Police
- Udai Shankar as Chaiwala
- Moumita as Receptionist
- Shefali Chauhan as Chhavi
- Barun Chanda as Mr. Sonkar

== Soundtrack ==
This is Onir's first film which doesn't have an original song. There are three old songs "Tum Aa Gaye Ho" (Aandhi), "Ajeeb Daastan Hai Ye" (Dil Apna Aur Preet Parayi) & "Pehla Nasha" (Jo Jeeta Wahi Sikander) which are woven into the narrative.
