= Satyadeep Mishra =

Indian actor (born 1972)

Satyadeep Misra
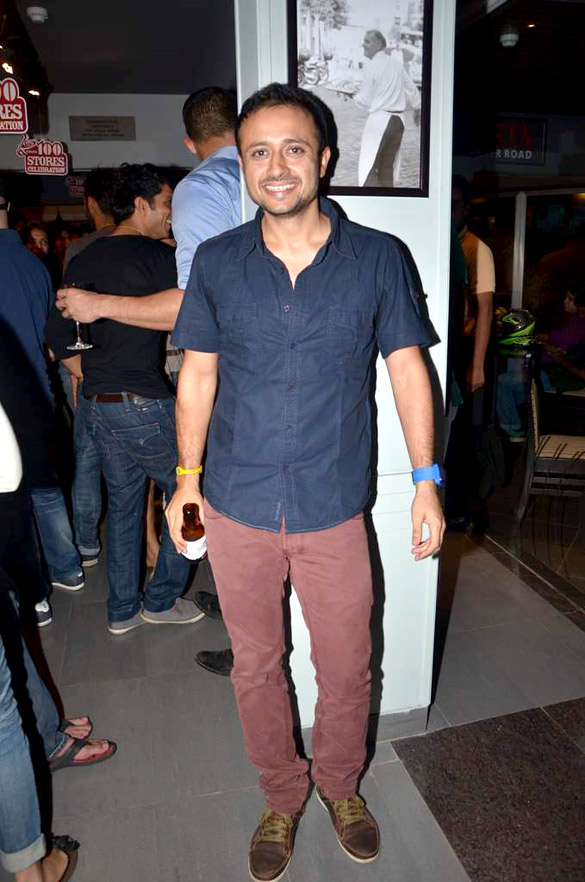
- Mishra in 2018
- Born: 27 November 1972 (age 53); Dehradun, Uttarakhand
- Education: St. Stephens College, Faculty of Law, University of Delhi
- Occupation: Actor
- Years active: 2011–present
- Spouses: Aditi Rao Hydari (m. 2007; div. 2013) Masaba Gupta (m. 2023)

Satyadeep Misra (born 27 November 1972) is an Indian actor who works in Hindi cinema, television and web series. He made his debut with the 2011 film No One Killed Jessica. He is known for P.O.W. Bandi Yuddh Ke (2016), Tandav (2022) and Mukhbir: The Story of a Spy (2022).

== Education and career ==
Satyadeep did his primary schooling from Hillgrange Preparatory School in Dehradun. He is an alumnus of The Doon School, Dehradun.

He received a BA in history from St. Stephens College, Delhi, followed by a degree in law from the Faculty of law, University of Delhi.

Mishra worked as a Corporate Lawyer in New Delhi and also had a brief stint with the Indian Government before he moved to Mumbai in 2010 to become an actor. He appeared for the UPSC exam.

== Personal life ==
Mishra was married to actress Aditi Rao Hydari. He married Masaba Gupta on 27 January 2023, and they had a daughter on 11 October 2024.

== Filmography ==
=== Films ===
Year	Title	Role	Notes
2011	No One Killed Jessica	Gaurav Capoor	
2011	Turning 30	Sahil	
2011	Chillar Party	Encyclopedia's father	
2011	Love Breakups Zindagi	Arjun	
2012	Ferrari Ki Sawaari	Coach Vilayat	
2014	Tigers	Dr. Faiz	
2015	Bombay Velvet	Chimman	
2016	Madly	Sudhir	Segment: "Clean Shaven"
2016	Phobia	Shaan	
2020	Kaali Khuhi	Darshan	
2022	Vikram Vedha	SSP Abbas Ali	

=== Television ===
Year	Title	Role
2016–2017	P.O.W. – Bandi Yuddh Ke	Squadron Leader Imaan Khan

=== Web series ===
Year	Title	Role	Language	Notes
2018	Smoke	ACP Pereira	Hindi	Eros Now
2018	Zero kms	ACP Pinto	Hindi	
2019	Thinkistan	Aashiq Jabeer	Hindi, English	
2019	Bhram		Hindi	
2020	Illegal	Puneet	English, Hindi	Voot/Jio Cinemas
2020	Naxalbari	Pahan	Hindi	
2020	Masaba Masaba	Vinay	English, Hindi	Netflix
2021	His Storyy	Kunal	Hindi	Altt
2022	Tandav		Hindi	Sony Liv
2022	Mukhbir	Alamgir	Hindi	
2023	Jehanabad – Of Love & War	SP Durgesh	Hindi	Sony Liv
