= Mukhbir - The Story of a Spy =

Indian spy-thriller series

- Genre: Espionage; Drama
- Created by: Shivam Nair
- Written by: Aseem Arora, Saurabh Swamy & Karan oberoi
- Screenplay by: Arshad Sayyed; Vaibhav Modi; Karan Oberoi
- Directed by: Shivam Nair; Jayprad Desai
- Starring: Prakash Raj; Zain Khan Durrani; Adil Hussain; Harsh Chhaya; Satyadeep Misra; Barkha Bisht; Zoya Afroz; Karan Oberoi; Bijou Thaangjam; Dilip Shankar; Atul Kumar; Sushil Pandey; Suneel Shanbag
- Music by: Abhishek Nailwal
- Country of origin: India
- Original language: Hindi
- No. of seasons: 1
- No. of episodes: 8

Production
- Producers: Vaibhav Modi; Tabassum Modi
- Cinematography: Dimo Popov
- Editor: Kunal Walve
- Production company: Victor Tango Entertainment Pvt. Ltd.

Original release
- Network: ZEE5

Mukhbir – The Story of a Spy is an Indian spy-thriller series directed by Shivam Nair and Jayprad Desai and produced by Vaibhav Modi and Tabassum Modi, under Victor Tango Entertainment. It is the official adaptation of the retired Joint Director of the Intelligence Bureau, Maloy Krishna Dhar's novel, Mission to Pakistan: An Intelligence Agent in Pakistan. It starred Zain Khan Durrani, Prakash Raj, Adil Hussain, Barkha Bisht, Harsh Chhaya, Satyadeep Mishra, Bijou Thaangjam and Zoya Afroz in pivotal roles. The plot follows a secret agent who led India in evading several aggressive advances from the enemy country by providing intelligence and helping India in 1965 war give a befitting reply to Pakistan's Operation Gibraltar and Operation Grand Slam manoeuvres. The series released on ZEE5 on 11 November 2022.

== Cast ==
- Prakash Raj as S. K. S. Moorthy (based on K. Sankaran Nair)
- Zain Khan Durrani as Harfan Bukhari/Kamran Bakhsh
- Adil Hussain as Ramkishore Negi (based on R. N. Kao)
- Harsh Chhaya as Major General Agha Khan (based on General Yahya Khan)
- Satyadeep Mishra as Alamgir
- Barkha Bisht as Begum Anar
- Dilip Shankar as Col. Zaidi, Director-General of ISI (based on Brigadier Riaz Hussain)
- Zoya Afroz as Jamila Ahmed
- Atul Kumar as Brigadier Habibullah
- Karan Oberoi as Kamal Kapoor
- Bijou Thaangjam as Junior Officer
- Sushil Pandey as Purshottam/Qasim
- Suneel Shanbag as Joydeep Burman
- Sushil Dhahiya as Pakistani President Hidayat Ali Khan (based on President Ayub Khan)
- Karan Mehta as Major Gunjeet Sodhi
- Vijay Kashyap as Prime Minister Lal Bahadur Shastri
- Avantika Akerkar as Prime Minister Indira Gandhi
- Jaya Swaminathan as Suhasini Moorthy
- Richard Bhakti Klein as Russell Clarke

== Episodes ==
No.	Title	Directed by	Written by	Original release date
1	"The Recruit"	Shivam Nair, Jayprad Desai	Karan Oberoi, Arsahd Sayyed	11 November 2022
2	"In the Lion's Den"	Shivam Nair, Jayprad Desai	Karan Oberoi Arshad Sayyed	11 November 2022
3	"True Lies"	Shivam Nair, Jayprad Desai	Karan Oberoi, Arshad Sayyed	11 November 2022
4	"Desert Hawk"	Shivam Nair, Jayprad Desai	Karan Oberoi, Arshad Sayyed	11 November 2022
5	"Chhaliya - Behrupiya"	Shivam Nair, Jayprad Desai	Karan Oberoi, Arshad Sayyed	11 November 2022
6	"Operation Grand Slam"	Shivam Nair, Jayprad Desai	Karan Oberoi, Arshad Sayyed	11 November 2022
7	"Last Throw of the Dice"	Shivam Nair, Jayprad Desai	Karan Oberoi, Arshad Sayyed	11 November 2022
8	"End Point"	Shivam Nair, Jayprad Desai	Karan Oberoi, Arshad Sayyed	11 November 2022

== Release ==
The series was announced with eight episodes on the occasion of India's 76th Independence Day on 15 August 2022. It has premiered on the streaming service, ZEE5 from 11 November 2022. It is dubbed in 3 languages Punjabi, Telugu and Tamil.
