= Bioscopewala =

- Directed by: Deb Medhekar
- Screenplay by: Deb Medhekar; Radhika Anand
- Story by: Sunil Doshi; Deb Medhekar
- Based on: Kabuliwala by Rabindranath Tagore
- Produced by: Sunil Doshi
- Starring: Danny Denzongpa; Geetanjali Thapa; Adil Hussain; Tisca Chopra
- Cinematography: Rafey Mehmood
- Edited by: Dipika Kalra
- Music by: Sandesh Shandilya
- Production companies: Handmade Films; Star India
- Distributed by: Fox Star Studios
- Release dates: 28 October 2017 (Tokyo International Film Festival); 25 May 2018 (India)
- Running time: 91 minutes
- Country: India
- Language: Hindi

Bioscopewala (transl. Man with a bioscope) is an Indian Hindi-language drama film directed by Deb Medhekar, and produced by Sunil Doshi. The film stars Danny Denzongpa and Geetanjali Thapa in lead roles and had its world premiere at the 30th Tokyo International Film Festival on 28 October 2017. The film is an adaptation of Nobel Laureate Rabindranath Tagore's 1892 short story Kabuliwala and released on 25 May 2018 in India. The official trailer of the film was released on YouTube by Fox Star Studios on 8 May 2018. Bioscopewala has taken forward the timeline of Kabuliwala, the original story written by Rabindranath Tagore, from the 19th century to somewhere in the 1980s during the Taliban regime and changed the profession of Rehmat, the central character, from a dry fruit seller to a man who goes around showing films to children through his bioscope.

== Plot ==
Bioscopewala is the story of Rehmat Khan, a man from Kabul, Afghanistan who used to show films to children through his Bioscope. Rehmat befriends a girl named Minnie who is of the same age as his own daughter and one day he disappears from her life. Many years later a grown-up Minnie, who is now a documentary film-maker living in France, learns about her father, who died in a plane crash while travelling to Afghanistan. As Minnie tries to figure out the reason why her father made that trip, she comes across Bioscopewala, the man who used to tell her stories when she was a child.

== Cast ==
- Danny Denzongpa as Rehmat Khan
- Geetanjali Thapa as Minnie Basu
- Adil Hussain as Robi Basu
- Tisca Chopra as Wahida
- Maya Sarao as Ghazala
- Brijendra Kala as Bhola
- Ekavali Khanna as Shobita
- Ivan Rodrigues as Airline Spokesperson
- Shashi Bhushan as Bakht Rawan
- Mir Sarwar as Zadran
- Tariq Khan as producer
- Ahmer Haider as security officer
- Sumit Sarkar as lawyer

== Production ==
=== Development ===
In the year 2009, it was reported that French-Afghan filmmaker Atiq Rahimi was planning to adapt Rabindranath Tagore's short story Kabuliwala into a film but the project did not materialize. In the year 2012, it was reported that Sunil Doshi was collaborating with Atiq Rahimi to make Kabuliwala, which was an adaptation of Rabindranath Tagore's short story of the same name, and Amitabh Bachchan was going to play the title role. The film, which had its screenplay written by Atiq Rahimi and Jean-Claude Carrière, was set in modern-day Kolkata where a refugee from Afghanistan befriends a 5 year old Bengali girl and was supposed to be filmed in Kolkata and Jaisalmer for a period of 60 days beginning from June 2013. Apart from Amitabh Bachchan, Iranian actress Golshifteh Farahani, Sara Arrjun, M.K. Raina and Rajat Kapoor were also supposed to be a part of the film. But the project got indefinitely delayed. In the year 2016, Sunil Doshi approached Ram Madhvani with the idea of adapting the story of Kabuliwala to the screen who in turn directed him towards his colleague Debashish Medhekar, who was an ad-filmmaker at Equinox. Debashish says that, "When Sunil said to do this film I felt it was everything that I wanted to do in my first feature – it had children, magic realism, nostalgia, travel, and says something about the world we live in and how people are suffering."

In 2016, Deb Medhekar's Bioscopewala was selected to be a part of the Work-in-Progress lab at the 10th NFDC Film Bazaar (an annual event where filmmakers present a rough cut of their projects for review and feedback by a panel of international film experts) held in Goa during 20–24 November 2016.

=== Casting ===
Director Deb Medhekar says that for the role of Minnie Basu he was not just looking for a good actress but also someone who resembles Meena Kumari, as a result of which he finalized Geetanjali Thapa for the role. Deb says, "I am a big Meena Kumari fan and I think no other actress can look as authentically beautiful and Bengali as Meena Kumari did in ‘Sahib Bibi Aur Ghulam’. So when I was casting Mini in ‘Bioscopewala’ as an adult, I cast Geetanjali Thapa because she has an uncanny resemblance."

== Soundtrack ==
"Bioscopewala"

Song by K Mohan

from the album Bioscopewala
- Language: Hindi
- Released: 17 May 2018
- Length: 4:03
- Label: Zee Music Company
- Composer: Sandesh Shandilya
- Lyricist: Gulzar
External audio
- Song on YouTube

There is only one song in the film, titled Bioscopewala. Sung by K Mohan this song was composed by Sandesh Shandilya while the lyrics were written by Gulzar.

== Critical reception ==
Reza Noorani of The Times of India praised the performances of Danny Denzongpa and Geetanjali Thapa and gave the film a rating of 3.5 out of 5 saying that, "At one hour and 31 minutes, the film doesn’t waiver much and wraps up the loose ends perfectly." Saibal Chatterjee of NDTV gave the film a rating of 4 out of 5 saying that, "Danny Denzongpa's Performance Is First-Rate In This Well-Crafted Sparkling Little Gem." Prasanna D Zore of Rediff gave the film a rating of 3 out of 5 and said that Bioscopewala "is a sweet film, soothing to the eyes, and weaves a story of human suffering cutting across national boundaries." Rajeev Masand of News18 called the film "a smart, moving adaptation of Rabindranath Tagore’s Kabuliwala." The critic praised the performances of all actors with special mention for Danny Denzongpa and concluded his review saying, "Make time for Bioscopewala, it’s a deeply affecting film, imbued with a lingering love for cinema." The Indian Express praised the performances of Danny Denzongpa and Brijendra Kala but felt that the film failed to tap its complete potential and gave the film a rating of 2.5 out of 5. Sweta Kausal of Hindustan Times praised the adaptation as well as the performances of all actors and gave the film a rating of 4 out of 5. Shrishti Negi of News18 gave the film a rating of 4 out of 5 and said that, "In a rising atmosphere of cultural intolerance, hate and violence, director Deb Medhekar’s Bioscopewala promises hope and manages to convey the more heart-warming emotion of humankind."
