= Jesus' Son (film) =

- Promotional poster
- Directed by: Alison Maclean
- Written by: Elizabeth Cuthrell; David Urrutia; Oren Moverman
- Based on: Jesus' Son by Denis Johnson
- Produced by: Elizabeth Cuthrell; Lydia Dean Pilcher; David Urrutia
- Starring: Billy Crudup; Samantha Morton; Denis Leary; Jack Black; Will Patton; Greg Germann; Holly Hunter; Dennis Hopper; Michael Shannon
- Cinematography: Adam Kimmel
- Edited by: Stuart Levy; Geraldine Peroni
- Music by: Joe Henry
- Production companies: Evenstar Films; Alliance Atlantis
- Distributed by: Lions Gate Films
- Release dates: September 5, 1999 (Telluride); June 16, 2000 (limited)
- Running time: 107 minutes
- Country: United States
- Language: English
- Budget: $2.5 million
- Box office: $1.3 million

Jesus' Son is a 1999 American drama film directed by Alison Maclean and written by Elizabeth Cuthrell, David Urrutia, and Oren Moverman, based on the collection of short stories by Denis Johnson. It stars Billy Crudup and Samantha Morton, with Holly Hunter, Dennis Hopper, Denis Leary, Will Patton, John Ventimiglia, Michael Shannon, and Jack Black in supporting roles. The title is taken from the lyrics of "Heroin", a 1966 song by the Velvet Underground.

The film was awarded the Little Golden Lion award and the Ecumenical Award at the 1999 Venice Film Festival, and was named one of the top ten films of the year by The New York Times and the Los Angeles Times.

== Plot ==
F.H., who earned his nickname because of his self-destructive personality, recounts the story of his descent into heroin addiction and his eventual recovery. His story starts in Iowa City in 1971, where as an aimless young man he meets Michelle and becomes romantically involved with her. His retellings include a stint as an orderly in a hospital and a position as a newsletter editor at an elderly care home in Arizona. When F.H. gets into a car accident, he is forced to straighten out his life and spend time in rehab. Along his journeys, F.H. encounters a succession of interesting characters.

== Cast ==
- Billy Crudup as F.H.
- Samantha Morton as Michelle
- Denis Leary as Wayne
- Holly Hunter as Mira
- Dennis Hopper as Bill
- Jack Black as Georgie
- Will Patton as John Smith
- Greg Germann as Dr. Shanis
- John Ventimiglia as McInnes
- Michael Shannon as Dundun

== Production ==
In 1997, it was announced filmmaker Alison Maclean would direct the film adaptation of Denis Johnson's book. Said Maclean, "The book has meant a lot to me ever since it came out. I was stunned by the force of Johnson’s vision and language and the way he transformed the bleak and the ordinary into little epiphanies that are beautiful, poetic and really funny.”

Jesus’ Son was shot in Philadelphia over seven weeks beginning on January 14, 1999. Some location work was also done in Tucson, Arizona.

== Reception ==
=== Release ===
In August 1999, Lions Gate Films acquired distribution rights for Jesus' Son and the film premiered at the Telluride Film Festival on September 5, 1999. At the Venice Film Festival, the film won the Little Golden Lion award and was nominated for a Best Director award for Alison Maclean. The film received a limited theatrical release on June 16, 2000.

=== Critical reception ===
Jesus' Son received positive reviews from critics. On Rotten Tomatoes, the film holds a rating of 79% from 52 reviews with the consensus: "Slight yet ultimately absorbing, Jesus' Son makes effective use of its period setting and talented ensemble cast." Metacritic, which uses a weighted average, assigned the film a score of 76 out of 100, based on 30 critics, indicating "generally favorable" reviews.

In his review, Roger Ebert awarded the film 3 1/2 stars out of 4 and wrote, "This is not a drug movie like any you've seen. It doesn't glamorize drugs or demonize them, but simply remembers them from the point of view of a survivor." He added the film surprised him "with moments of wry humor, poignancy, sorrow and wildness. It has a sequence as funny as any I've seen this year, and one as harrowing, and it ends in a bittersweet minor key."

In his review, A.O. Scott of The New York Times wrote "one of the pleasures of [the film]...is watching a filmmaker take risks and discover new resources of style. True to her source, Ms. Maclean tells the young man's story in a looping, absent-minded manner, skittering ahead and then scrambling backward to fill in forgotten details. Her decision to string together a series of self-contained vignettes could have resulted in meandering tedium, but she manages to find a loose, improvisatory rhythm that matches Mr. Johnson's discursive riffing, and that gives her scenes a keen edge of surprise." Of Billy Crudup's performance, Scott wrote he gives off a "curious aura of innocence. He's like Candide strung out on every drug he can find, or an itinerant holy man hitchhiking across the Midwest in wet, filthy hipster hand-me-downs."

=== Year-end lists ===
- Runner up for Top 10 (not ranked) – Roger Ebert, Chicago Sun-Times
- 9th – Kenneth Turan, Los Angeles Times
- Top 10 (not ranked) – A.O. Scott, The New York Times
