= Masaba Gupta =

Indian fashion designer (born 1989)

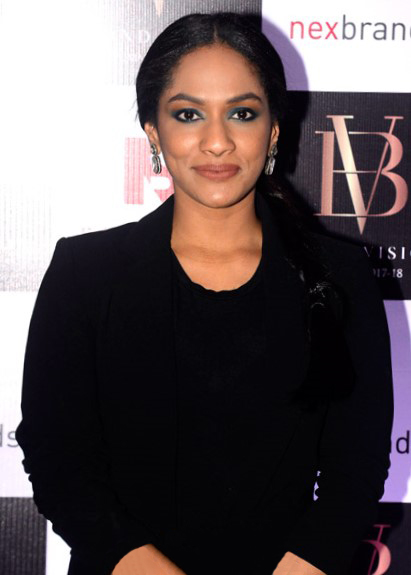
- Gupta in 2018
- Born: 2 November 1989 (age 36); New Delhi, India
- Occupation: Fashion designer
- Label: Masaba
- Spouses: Madhu Mantena (m. 2015; div. 2019) Satyadeep Mishra (m. 2023)
- Children: 1
- Parents: Viv Richards (father); Neena Gupta (mother)
- Relatives: Mali Richards (half-brother)
- Website: houseofmasaba.com

Masaba Gupta (born 2 November 1989) is an Indian fashion designer and actress, best known as the founder of the fashion label House of Masaba.

== Early life ==
Masaba Gupta was born in 1989 and is the daughter of Indian actress Neena Gupta and West Indies' former cricketer Viv Richards and grew up in Mumbai. Her parents never married and she was raised by her mother, who moved the family from New Delhi to Mumbai. Gupta found a father figure in her late maternal grandfather, and when she turned 20 she reconnected with her father and the two subsequently formed a strong bond.

At the age of 8 she wanted to become a tennis player, but stopped training at 16. Passionate about dance and music, Gupta wanted to join Shiamak Davar's dance group, but did not when her mother discouraged it. She subsequently took up a course in music and dance in London, but dropped out when she felt lonely and homesick.

She later joined the Premlila Vithaldas Polytechnic at the SNDT Women's University.

Gupta has stated that her schooling was sometimes marred by instance of racism from other students.

== Career ==
At the age of 19, Gupta applied for fashion in Mumbai with support from Wendell Rodricks. She named her first collection Kattran (transl. Miniature bits of fabric). Her Lakme Fashion Week 2014 collection "Wanderess" was "inspired by novelist Roman Payne's doe-eyed gypsy girl character, Saskia" in his novel, The Wanderess. Gupta has become known for the creative and artistic names she gives each collection.

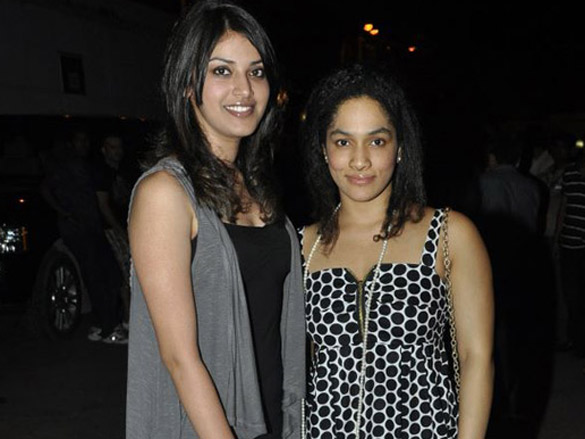
Gupta (right) with Anushka Ranjan (left) at Femina Miss India contest in 2010.

Gupta's design aesthetic has been defined as a blend of contemporary and traditional with modernity taking the upper hand. She specializes in ethnic wear for women and uses silk, chiffon and cotton as well as rich embroidery work, and is noted for her unconventional prints along with feminine drapes and silhouettes. The Mumbai daily broadsheet dna remarked her work has "a unique Indianness in a very modern context", citing her "Tamil script sarees and jackets" and the way she uses cotton and muslin.

In 2016, Gupta collaborated with Maybelline New York to produce a collection of clothes inspired by a new lipstick line that the company was launching, but the project fell through for a variety of logistical reasons. She has stated that the biggest regret of her career was her Stylista collection.

In 2017, she was tasked with representing India in an exhibit showcasing re-designs of Levi's iconic trucker jacket. She chose to use her signature cow motif. The exhibit also featured a re-design by Justin Timberlake and other celebrities.

Gupta has been credited as the first Indian designer to do a fashion show via Instagram. She claims that around 60 per cent of her sales happen through WhatsApp.

In 2018 she launched a hijab-saree line targeting Muslim women who want to wear Indian high fashion.

In 2020, Netflix aired Masaba Masaba, a semi fictional series in which Masaba and her mother starred as themselves, showing glimpses of their lives with fashion and film.

== Personal life ==
Gupta married film producer Madhu Mantena in 2015 in a civil ceremony. In late 2018 the couple announced that they were on a trial separation. The couple officially got divorced in September 2019. She married Satyadeep Mishra, who played her ex-husband in Masaba Masaba, on 27 January 2023. Their daughter was born on 11 October 2024.

== Filmography ==
Year	Title	Role	Notes	Ref.
2019	MTV Supermodel of the Year	Judge	Reality show	
2020–2022	Masaba Masaba	Herself	Television series	
2022	Modern Love: Mumbai	Saiba	Anthology film	
2025	Kesari Chapter 2	Dancer	Special appearance in song "Khumaari"	
