= Hiding (TV series) =

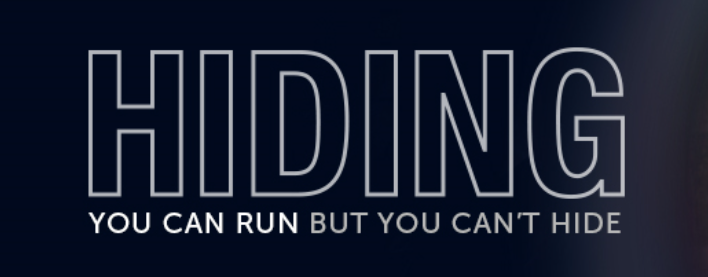
- Genre: Crime Drama
- Created by: Matt Ford
- Directed by: Shawn Seet; Tori Garrett; Grant Brown
- Starring: James Stewart; Kate Jenkinson; Lincoln Younes; Olivia DeJonge; Marcus Graham; Stephen Curry
- Opening theme: "Hit the Road Jack" by Shirley Horn
- Country of origin: Australia
- Original language: English
- No. of seasons: 1
- No. of episodes: 8

Production
- Production company: Playmaker Media

Original release
- Network: ABC
- Release: 5 February – 26 March 2015

Hiding is an Australian television drama series which screened on ABC1 from 5 February 2015. The eight-part series follows a Gold Coast family in witness protection who must build a new life in a strange city, Sydney. It is created by Matt Ford and directed by Shawn Seet, Tori Garrett and Grant Brown.

== Synopsis ==
After a botched drug deal, Troy (James Stewart) must take his family into Witness Protection in exchange for giving evidence against his former employer, vicious crime boss Nils Vandenberg (Marcus Graham).

With new names and fresh identities, the Quigg family is ripped from their home on the sun-drenched Gold Coast and dumped in a safe house in Western Sydney as the Swift Family. But dislocation puts immense pressure on everyone.

Lincoln Swift's cover as a post-doctorate fellow in the Criminal Psychology Department of a Sydney university challenges him in fundamental ways. He's told to keep his head down and meet with handler John Pinder (Stephen Curry) to prepare his testimony. But the academic teachings of the department begin to conflict with Lincoln's real-life experience.

Lincoln's wife, Rebecca (Kate Jenkinson), has to give up her nursing career and cease all contact with her mother Jenny (Paula Duncan), brother Kosta Krilich (Nathan Page), and her very pregnant sister-in-law and best friend Dimity (Jodi Gordon). Isolation and the pressure of keeping her family safe take their toll, and Rebecca reaches out to an old friend with serious consequences.

A bureaucratic bungle lands Mitchell (Lincoln Younes) and Tara (Olivia DeJonge) in a performing arts school. While it’s a happy outcome for aspirational fifteen-year-old Tara, it's torture for seventeen-year-old surfer, Mitchell, who is desperate to get his old life back, especially his gorgeous girlfriend, Kelly (Jenna Kratzel). Adding to the teenager's torment, no phones or Facebook, no texts or Twitter. Because a trace could bring a killer to their door.

As the dysfunctional Swift family adjusts to their new world living with constant threat of corrupt cops or a leak within Witness Protection, a surprise phone call unleashes an emotional upheaval that could crack their cover and bring those who want Lincoln silenced gunning for him and those he loves.

== Cast ==
- James Stewart as Lincoln Swift / Troy Quigg
- Kate Jenkinson as Rebecca Swift / Marie Quigg
- Lincoln Younes as Mitchell Swift / Mitchell Quigg
- Olivia DeJonge as Tara Swift / Shaneen Quigg
- Cariba Heine as Harriet
- Marcus Graham as Nils Vandenberg
- Stephen Curry as Detective John Pinder
- Nathan Page as Kosta 'Koz' Krilich
- Jodi Gordon as Dimity Krilich
- Paula Duncan as Jenny Krilich
- Jacqueline McKenzie as Ferdine Lamay
- Mitchell Butel as Isaac Ulrich
- Kim Gyngell as Warwick Darmody
- Natasha Beaumont as Rayburn
- Ryan Johnson as Ash Adamo
- Arka Das as Clifford George
- Jenna Kratzel as Kelly
- Alan Flower as Denallo
- Winnie Liu as Shantelle
- Ling-Hsueh Tang as Irene

== Episodes ==
No.	Title	Original release date
1	"Episode 1"	5 February 2015
After a botched drug deal, Troy must take his family into Witness Protection in exchange for giving evidence against his former employer, a vicious crime.
2	"Episode 2"	12 February 2015
The Swifts try to make their new identities work as Mitch and Tara start at a new school. Bec and Lincoln distrust Pinder as the case against Nils stalls.
3	"Episode 3"	19 February 2015
Tara makes an awful discovery, and ends up in a fight. Bec has a terrifying encounter with an intruder. Lincoln ponders biosocial crime theory.
4	"Episode 4"	26 February 2015
Mitch has run away; Lincoln learns the awful truth about his best friend. To save Mitchell, Lincoln has to face his adversaries head-on.
5	"Episode 5"	5 March 2015
Lincoln discovers that a hit-man may be on his trail; and Bec's renewed friendship with Ash threatens to expose their plight.
6	"Episode 6"	12 March 2015
Lincoln finds himself giving a tutorial; Bec confesses she called her mum; and Mitch and Tara put the whole family in danger.
7	"Episode 7"	19 March 2015
Lincoln is missing and Bec fears he's dead while Mitchell and Tara each secretly believe they're responsible for their father's kidnapping.
8	"Episode 8"	26 March 2015
Lincoln knows that Sydney is no longer safe, but Bec wants to stay to meet their daughter; and Pinder has to cut the family loose.
