= I.D. (2012 film) =

- Directed by: Kamal K. M
- Screenplay by: Kamal K. M.
- Story by: Kamal K. M.
- Produced by: Resul Pookutty; Rajeev Ravi; Madhu Neelakandan; Sunil Babu; B. Ajithkumar
- Starring: Geetanjali Thapa; Murari Kumar
- Cinematography: Madhu Neelakandan
- Edited by: B. Ajithkumar
- Music by: John P. Varkey; Sunil Kumar
- Production companies: Collective Phase One; Jar Pictures
- Release date: 5 October 2012 (Busan International Film Festival)
- Running time: 90 min
- Country: India
- Language: Hindi
- Budget: ₹5 million

I.D. is a 2012 Indian Hindi-language drama film directed by Kamal K. M. and produced by Collective Phase One. The film stars Geetanjali Thapa and Murari Kumar in leading roles and had its world premiere at the Busan International Film Festival 2012.

== Plot ==
Charu (Geetanjali Thapa) lives with her friends in a rented accommodation in Mumbai. One day a painter visits the house to paint a wall which leaves Charu miffed because she wasn't informed about it by anyone. Charu asks the painter to quickly finish his job and gets busy. A few minutes later she discovers that the painter is lying unconscious on the floor. Charu looks for some kind of identification on the man but doesn't find one. Not knowing who to inform or call, Charu takes the painter to a hospital and decides to find out the identity of the stranger.

== Cast ==
- Geetanjali Thapa as Charu
- Murari Kumar as Painter
- Rukshana Tabassum
- Shinjini Raval
- Shashi Sharma as Old woman
- Bachan Pachera as Security Guard
- Anita Mahajan as Lady in the lift
- Alok Chaturvedi
- Divyendu Sharma
- Vinay Sharma
- Karma Takapa
- Tushar Tupe
- Archana Nandi
- Pankaj Purandare as Hospital Manager
- Harry Satnani
- Dinkar Gavande
- Preeti Sharma
- Arun Sukumar
- Ashish Verma
- Gaurav Sharma
- Pawan Singh
- Kishor Mukhi
- Vinod Hegde
- Sashi Bhushan
- Mehek Kiran Jadhav
- Saharsh Kumar Shukla
- Habib Azmi Shaikh

== Production ==
=== Development ===
The story of the film originated from a real life incident which happened with a friend of Kamal, the director of the film, in which a labourer collapsed while working leaving the lady living in the house in a difficult situation because she had no idea about the man's whereabouts. "ID takes off from that point and shows the protagonist’s efforts to trace the roots of this man without a name", says the director who got inspired to write this film following the incident at his friend's house. Director Kamal says that his movie I.D. "addresses the issue of displacement and its many consequences as the need for identity and displacement are interconnected."

== Critical reception ==
Andrew Robertson of Eye For Film gave the film a rating of 4 out of 5 and said that, "As Charu searches for identity the film itself asks questions about what that means. Ostensibly simple but brave enough to give its audience the time to understand, ID knows what it's looking for, and you should seek it out." Jay Weissberg of Variety praised the concept, camerawork, editing and above all the acting performance of Geetanjali Thapa and said that, "Thapa, with very little acting experience, delivers a superb performance that captures the socially apathetic urban professional who believably awakens to her humanity, and heads far outside her comfort zone." Rowena Santos Aquino of Next Projection praised the film saying that, "A very immersive, distinct, and suspenseful work that addresses questions of identity and anonymity, the big city, communications technologies, and procedure, I.D. is close to breathtaking and impressive." and gave the film a score of 87 out of 100. Shadab Alam of Gigareel praised the movie saying that, "A very well written morally engaging movie about the need for identity even in the day when everyone and everything is connected through Internet." Vassilis Economou of 24FPSVerite appreciated the film saying that, "This is almost a purely script based film and Kamal K.M. who is also the writer did an excellent job. It is an intensive and complete work that is well presented to the audience."

== Festivals ==
The film was premiered at the Busan International Film Festival, Busan, South Korea. It has been selected in the following film festivals too:

- Abu Dhabi Film Festival, UAE
- Torino Film Festival, Italy, 2012
- International Film Festival of Marrakech, 2012
- Mumbai International Film Festival, 2012
- International Film Festival of India, India 2012
- International Film Festival of Kerala, India, 2012
- Three Continents Film Festival, Nantes, France, 2012
- Indian Film Festival of Melbourne, Australia, 2013
- International Film Festival Rotterdam, 2013
- Deauville Asian Film Festival, Deauville, France, 2013 - Lotus for Best Film
