= Perfect Sisters =

2014 Canadian crime drama film

- Theatrical release poster
- Directed by: Stanley M. Brooks
- Screenplay by: Fab Filippo; Adam Till
- Based on: The Class Project: How to Kill a Mother by Bob Mitchell
- Produced by: Juliette Hagopian; Damian Ganczewski
- Starring: Abigail Breslin; Georgie Henley; James Russo; Mira Sorvino
- Cinematography: Stéphanie Weber Biron
- Edited by: Robin Katz
- Music by: Carmen Rizzo
- Production company: Julijette
- Distributed by: Gravitas Ventures
- Release dates: April 11, 2014 (Canada; limited release)
- Running time: 98 minutes
- Country: Canada
- Language: English

Perfect Sisters (released in the United Kingdom as Deadly Sisters) is a 2014 Canadian crime drama film directed by Stanley M. Brooks. It stars Abigail Breslin and Georgie Henley. The film was released on April 11, 2014, and was based on the novel The Class Project: How to Kill a Mother, which itself was based on the real-life Bathtub Girls murder.

== Plot ==
Sandra Andersen, her younger sister by one year, Elizabeth (aka "Beth"), and their younger brother, seven-year-old, Robert (aka "Bobby"), live with their alcoholic 44-year-old mother Linda. Linda, every now and again, has boyfriends who are usually abusive towards her and her children, both physically and sexually.

Sandra now is a senior in high school and Beth is a junior and they cannot take Linda and her alcoholism. They plot to kill their mother and plan to live with their friends after they kill her because they will get their mother's life insurance money. They tell their friends Justin and Ashley to make reservations at their favorite restaurant while Sandra and Beth get Linda intoxicated, drug her and later drown her in their apartment bathtub. Once they do all of this, Sandra feels guilty while Beth feels excited. Beth then convinces her that everything is going to be better with their mother dead.

The two are sent to live with their aunt and Bobby is sent to live with his long-lost estranged father. No one suspects that Sandra and Beth have anything to do with their mother's death, as everyone just thinks that she drowned in her bathtub while being drunk and on drugs. Sandra and Beth begin to get popular at school after telling their friends that they killed their mother and no one at school even thinks about reporting them.

An older friend of Sandra's begins to believe that Sandra and Beth had something to do with it after Sandra tells him that their mother's death might not have been an accident. He goes to the police and they tell him to wear a wire, pick Sandra up and see if he can find out more about the incident. After she tells him the truth, Sandra and Beth get interviewed by police and Beth remains calm while Sandra has a meltdown. When the police find all the evidence to prove that Sandra and Beth killed Linda, the two get sentenced to ten years in prison and can have no contact with one another.

== Cast ==
- Abigail Breslin as Sandra Anderson
- Georgie Henley as Elizabeth "Beth" Anderson
- Mira Sorvino as Linda Anderson/Perfect Mom
- Caleb and Braden Pederson as Robert "Bobby" Anderson
- James Russo as Steve Bowman
- Rusty Schwimmer as Aunt Martha
- Jeff Ballard as Justin
- Zoë Belkin as Ashley
- Jonathan Malen as David
- Zak Santiago as Detective Santiago Gates

In addition, Henley’s sister, Laura Henley, plays Beth as a child, while Breslin’s brother, Spencer Breslin, plays the stoner cousin, Derek.

== Controversy ==
The film was scrutinized by the Toronto community for portraying the teenage murderers through a far too sympathetic lens. Author and journalist Bob Mitchell stated, "I don't think the movie dealt with how cold-blooded and calculating they were", in an interview about the theater adaptation of his book.

== Reception ==
On review aggregator Rotten Tomatoes, the film holds an approval rating of 25% based on 12 reviews, with an average rating of 3.86/10. On Metacritic, the film has a weighted average score of 44 out of 100, based on 8 critics, indicating "mixed or average favorable reviews". Dennis Harvey of Variety criticized the film for being "ineffectual and cartoonish", and compared it unfavorably to the similarly-themed 1994 film Heavenly Creatures.

== See also ==
- Heavenly Creatures, similar plot
