= Masaba Masaba =

Indian TV series

- Genre: Drama
- Written by: Sonam Nair; Nandini Gupta; Anupama Ramachandran; Punya Arora
- Directed by: Sonam Nair
- Starring: Masaba Gupta; Neena Gupta
- Country of origin: India
- Original language: English
- No. of seasons: 2
- No. of episodes: 13

Production
- Producer: Ashvini Yardi
- Running time: 25-35 minutes
- Production company: Viniyard Films

Original release
- Network: Netflix
- Release: 28 August 2020 – 29 July 2022

Masaba Masaba is an Indian biographical drama television series based on the life of Masaba Gupta. It is written and directed by Sonam Nair and is produced by Ashvini Yardi's Viniyard Films. It stars Masaba Gupta and her mother, Neena Gupta, playing themselves. The series premiered on Netflix on 28 August 2020. The second season premiered on 29 July 2022.

== Premise ==
The series is a scripted version of the life of Masaba Gupta, featuring her family, her love life and her career as a fashion designer. Masaba and her mother, Neena Gupta, play fictionalized versions of themselves.

== Plot ==
Masaba and her friends and family are left in a stir when an apparent rumor indicating her rocky marriage is featured in the newspaper. Despite all the speculation around her marriage, she is accompanied by her husband, Vinay to an award function later that evening and she hopes that it will hush everyone. However, once the program concludes, it is revealed that the couple truly has decided to end things for the better and upon constant insistence from Vinay, Masaba makes the news public through Instagram.

As she moves in with her mother, Neena Gupta, she realizes that things weren't going to get any better in the near future. Between accepting her separation from Vinay, her mother's constant interference with her life decisions, and unwanted social scrutiny, Masaba begins to struggle in her professional life. She eventually moves out to live on her own and for once being able to get a space where she can work out her new collection at peace. However, after having delivered a disaster of a collection launch titled "Hot mess" inspired by her own life, Masaba learns some bitter truth about herself from her therapist who says that her survival instinct is high as she always finds a way of escaping her problems.

Set out to make things right, Masaba decides to face her problems and starts by facing her infuriated investors who warn her to fix things before it's too late. Masaba then decides to relaunch her collection because amidst all the drama in the fashion show the previous night, no one really could focus on the dresses. This time around the dresses were modelled by her own employees to emphasize that her collection "Hot Mess" actually stands for celebrating imperfections. She then goes ahead to face her 'Original Problem' and meets Vinay to sell off their house, which marks the proper ending of her relationship. Finally she goes to meet Mr. Rana, her main investor to apologize for all the failed shows. Instead, he informs her that her posts regarding the relaunch of her collection has been taken very positively by the industry and got everyone talking about it. Masaba breaks down into tears that she has done something right after so long and Mr. Rana comforts her by apologizing that he didn't believe in her at first. He then starts to take a romantic liking towards Masaba.

Her next collection launching took a sad turn when everyone in the audience began leaving to see a wannabe-influencer/designer Qayannat's collection. Amidst all the tension, she also has to take a pregnancy test and is caught by her mother before that. Neena is furious that Masaba is going around having sex with so many men. Masaba eventually takes the test and it comes out negative. She points out to her mother that she really needed her support and not her lecture that day, which strains their relationship further. To bring her professional game up once again, she decides to launch "House of Shadi" to make clothes for wedding and soon finds herself tangled in a weird relationship with the groom. While on the other hand, she hints at her interest towards Mr. Rana, who is in fact confused as to what Masaba really wants out of him.

With her successfully launching house of Shadi, securing the grand finale of "Fashion week", and her mazing through her relationships with the two men, she eventually makes a choice and settles for the best.

== Cast ==
=== Season 1 ===
==== Main ====
- Masaba Gupta as herself
- Neena Gupta as herself
- Neil Bhoopalam as Dhairya Rana (Masaba's investor, with whom she starts a romantic relationship later)
- Rytasha Rathore as Gia (Masaba's best friend and utmost support system who doesn't shy away from schooling Masaba when required)
- Satyadeep Mishra as Vinay (Masaba's ex husband)
- Pooja Bedi as Geeta Chopra (Masaba's therapist who is vastly occupied by her own personal life problems)
- Suchitra Pillai as Mohini
- Tanuj Virwani as Manav
- Smaran Sahu as Jogi
- Nayan Shukla as Gehna
- Gobind Singh Mehta as Cyrus
- Sunita Rajwar as Padma
- Ahmad Harhash as Rajat

==== Cameo appearances ====
- Kiara Advani as herself
- Shibani Dandekar as herself
- Farah Khan as herself
- Mithila Palkar as herself
- Malavika Mohanan as herself
- Gajraj Rao as himself
- Dara Sandhu as himself
- Abhishek Bhalerao as driving instructor

=== Season 2 ===
==== Main ====
- Masaba Gupta as herself
- Neena Gupta as herself
- Neil Bhoopalam as Dhairya Rana
- Rytasha Rathore as Gia
- Kusha Kapila as Nicole
- Barkha Singh as Aisha Mehrauli
- Armaan Khera as Fateh
- Kareema Barry as Qayanaat
- Ram Kapoor as Shekhar Mirza
- Nayan Shukla as Gehna
- Yamini Joshi as Girl for event

==== Cameo appearances ====
- Kartik Aaryan as Dr. K
- Neelam Kothari as herself
- Milind Soman as himself
- Bappi Lahiri as himself
- Maria Goretti as Aisha's mother
- Kanwaljit Singh as himself

== Episodes ==
Series overview
Series	Episodes	Originally released
1	6	28 August 2020
2	7	29 July 2022

=== Season 1 (2020) ===
No. overall	No. in season	Title	Directed by	Written by	Original release date
1	1	"Rumour Has It"	Sonam Nair	Sonam Nair	28 August 2020
2	2	"I Got It From My Mamma"	Sonam Nair	Sonam Nair	28 August 2020
3	3	"Man! I Feel Like A Woman"	Sonam Nair	Sonam Nair	28 August 2020
4	4	"Bringing Sexy Back"	Sonam Nair	Sonam Nair	28 August 2020
5	5	"Work B**ch!"	Sonam Nair	Sonam Nair	28 August 2020
6	6	"Hot Mess"	Sonam Nair	Sonam Nair	28 August 2020

=== Season 2 (2022) ===
No. overall	No. in season	Title	Directed by	Written by	Original release date
7	1	"Baby One More Time"	Sonam Nair	Sonam Nair	29 July 2022
8	2	"You Should See Me In A Crown"	Sonam Nair	Sonam Nair	29 July 2022
9	3	"Set Fire To The Rain"	Sonam Nair	Sonam Nair	29 July 2022
10	4	"Blinding Lights"	Sonam Nair	Sonam Nair	29 July 2022
11	5	"A Hard Day's Night"	Sonam Nair	Sonam Nair	29 July 2022
12	6	"Blurred Lines"	Sonam Nair	Sonam Nair	29 July 2022
13	7	"I Did It My Way"	Sonam Nair	Sonam Nair	29 July 2022

== Production ==
The series was announced by Netflix on 16 July 2019, with Sonam Nair as the director. It is Masaba's debut role. The first trailer was released on 14 August 2020.

In June 2022, Netflix announced that the series was renewed for a second season. It premiered on 29 July 2022.
