= Mali Richards =

West Indian cricketer

Personal information
- Full name: Mali Alexander Richards
- Born: 2 September 1983 (age 43); Taunton, Somerset, England
- Batting: Left-handed
- Bowling: Right-arm medium
- Relatives: Viv Richards (father); Masaba Gupta (half-sister)

Domestic team information
- Years: Team
- 2009–2014: Leeward Islands

Career statistics
Competition	FC	LA	T20
Matches	15	2	1
Runs scored	275	1	5
Batting average	13.09	1.00	5.00
100s/50s	0/0	0/0	0/0
Top score	43	1	5
Balls bowled	1,332	0	0
Wickets	15	–	–
Bowling average	56.46	–	–
5 wickets in innings	0	–	–
10 wickets in match	0	–	–
Best bowling	3/62	–	–
Catches/stumpings	12/–	0/–	0/–
- Source: CricketArchive, 16 January 2011

Mali Alexander Richards (born 2 September 1983) is a West Indian cricketer who played first-class cricket for the Leeward Islands.

== Personal life ==
The son of Viv Richards, Richards was born in England and educated at Cheltenham College in Gloucestershire.

== Career ==
Richards has had a stint with Middlesex County Cricket Club and also played for Oxford UCCE and the Gloucestershire 2nd XI. Richards has also represented Antigua and Barbuda, hitting 319 for them in a game against the US Virgin Islands in 2003. The game however was not a first-class fixture and in 11 matches for various sides he is yet to pass 50. In June 2007 he accused Middlesex of failing to help him develop. Through his father, he is the half-brother of fashion designer Masaba Gupta.
