= Zain Khan Durrani =

Indian actor and poet

- Occupations: Actor, poet
- Years active: 2017–present
- Known for: Mukhbir - The Story of a Spy
- Notable work: Mukhbir (2022), Bell Bottom (2021), Kuch Bheege Alfaz (2018)

Zain Khan Durrani is an Indian actor and poet, known for Mukhbir - The Story of a Spy, Bell Bottom, and Kuchh Bheege Alfaaz.

== Early life and education ==
Durrani was born in Srinagar, Jammu and Kashmir, India into family of Pashtun origin. He studied at Burn Hall School, and Delhi Public School and graduated from Zakir Hussain College, Delhi University. He did stage acting in school, and has written poetry.

== Career ==
Zain was seen in the acclaimed 2022 series Mukhbir - The Story of a Spy, where he played the lead as Harfan Bukhari. The series was very well received by the critics and audience alike. In 2017, Durrani worked the clapperboard for the film Shab. In 2018 Zain debuted to acquire a cult fan-base with his lead role as Alfaaz in the movie Kuchh Bheege Alfaaz.

Zain was a radio jockey on the programme Lamhey with Zain on Big 92.7 FM. In 2020 he played Lateef in Vidhu Vinod Chopra's film Shikara. He also played the role of hijacker Daljeet Singh Dodi in the 2021 film Bell Bottom.

== Filmography ==
=== Films ===
Year	Title	Role	Language	Notes
2018	Kuchh Bheege Alfaaz	Alfaaz	Hindi	
2020	Shikara	Lateef Lone	Hindi	
2021	Bell Bottom	Daljeet	Hindi	
2025	Songs of Paradise	Azaada Maqbool Shah	Hindi	
2025	Aankhon Ki Gustaakhiyan	Abhinav Grover	Hindi	
2025	Gustaakh Ishq	Young Aziz	Hindi	

=== Web series ===
Year	Title	Role	Language	OTT Platform
2022	Mukhbir - The Story of a Spy	Harfan Bhukari	Hindi	ZEE5
