= Malbasey =

- Village
- Location in Sikkim, India Malbasey (India)
- Coordinates: 27°08′58″N 88°13′15″E
- Country: India
- State: Sikkim
- District: Soreng
- Elevation: 1,300 m (4,300 ft)

Languages
  - Official: Nepali, Bhutia, Lepcha, Limbu, Newari, Rai, Gurung, Mangar, Sherpa, Tamang and Sunwar
- Time zone: UTC+5:30 (IST)
- PIN: 737 121
- Vehicle registration: SK
- Nearest city: Soreng
- Sex ratio: 962 ♂/♀
- Literacy: 83%
- Vidhan Sabha constituency: Soreyong Chakung
- Climate: sub tropical to alpine (Köppen)

Malbasey is a small village in West Sikkim surrounded by forest. It falls under Soreng Sub-division and is the home place of former chief minister of Sikkim Shri Nar Bahadur Bhandari. There is a school named Don Bosco School Malbasey, situated at the top of the village.
