= Georgie Henley =

English actress (born 1995)

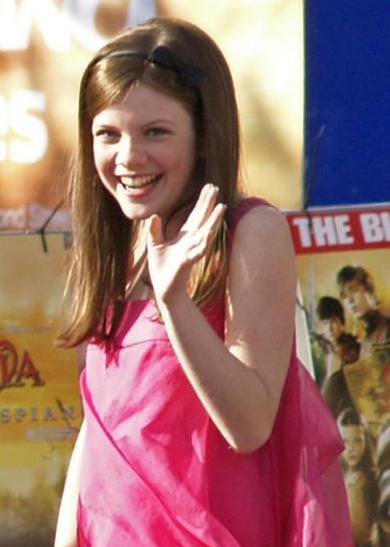
- Henley at the premiere of The Chronicles of Narnia: Prince Caspian in 2008
- Born: Georgina Helen Henley; 9 July 1995 (age 31); Ilkley, West Yorkshire, England
- Education: Clare College, Cambridge
- Occupations: Actress, writer, director
- Years active: 2004–present

Georgina Helen Henley (born 9 July 1995) is an English actress. She began acting as a child, and became known for starring as Lucy Pevensie in the fantasy film series The Chronicles of Narnia (2005–2010), which grossed over US$1.5 billion worldwide and won her several accolades. This includes nods from several critic groups and an Empire Award nomination.

Following the end of the Chronicles of Narnia franchise, she played a leading role in the thriller film Perfect Sisters (2014), and headlined the independent mystery film The Sisterhood of Night (2015), the latter of which earned her praise and established her as a mature actress. She went on to play Margaret Tudor in the biographical series The Spanish Princess (2019–2020).

== Early life ==
Henley was born on 9 July 1995 to Helen and Mike Henley in Ilkley, West Yorkshire, where she attended Moorfield School for Girls before attending Bradford Grammar School. She has two older sisters, Rachael and Laura. Rachael played the older version of Lucy Pevensie in The Chronicles of Narnia: The Lion, the Witch and the Wardrobe.

== Career ==
Henley made her acting debut as Lucy Pevensie in 2005 film The Chronicles of Narnia: The Lion, the Witch and the Wardrobe, based on the C.S. Lewis novel The Lion, the Witch and the Wardrobe. The film grossed over $745 million worldwide. Henley reprised her role of Lucy Pevensie in the 2008 sequel The Chronicles of Narnia: Prince Caspian and 2010 sequel The Chronicles of Narnia: The Voyage of the Dawn Treader.

Since the release of The Lion, the Witch and the Wardrobe, Henley has appeared as Jill in the stage play Babes in the Wood put on by Upstagers' Theatre Group, which ran from 27 January to 4 February 2006. She starred as Scaramouche in Bradford Grammar School's production of We Will Rock You, which ran from 13 to 16 March 2013. She also appeared as the young Jane Eyre in the 2006 BBC adaptation of Jane Eyre.

Henley appears as Beth in the crime-drama Perfect Sisters a film based on the story of two Canadian teenaged sisters who killed their mother. The film was released in April 2014. Henley plays Mary Warren in The Sisterhood of Night. The film was released in April 2015.

During her time at University of Cambridge Henley studied English and performed on stage in Play It Again, Sam by Woody Allen; The Penelopiad by Margaret Atwood; The Trojan Women; A Clockwork Orange by Anthony Burgess; and in the CUADC/Footlights annual pantomime. Henley has also directed projects including co-directing Sweeney Todd: The Demon Barber of Fleet Street, and After Seymour (the latter of which she co-wrote). In 2016, she appeared in the stage productions of: Skylight by David Hare; Girl, Interrupted (an adaptation of the book with the same name; and Swallow by Stef Smith. In the summer of 2014, Henley went to the Edinburgh Fringe Festival along with Cambridge Shortlegs, performing once again in The Penelopiad in the role of Eurycleia.

In 2015, Henley wrote and directed her first short film, TIDE, the story of a young lesbian couple. In late 2016, Henley starred in the film Access All Areas starring as Nat. In 2018 Henley played Margaret Tudor in the Starz limited series The Spanish Princess, based on the novels The Constant Princess (2005) and The King's Curse (2014) by Philippa Gregory. In January 2019, she was named as a cast member for an upcoming Game of Thrones prequel series, which would not be picked up by HBO.

In 2022, she published a pamphlet of poems called Amphibian.

== Personal life ==
As of 2012, Henley was a supporter of SOS Children's Villages, an international orphan charity providing homes and mothers for orphaned and abandoned children. She resides in London, England. Henley has stated that she identifies as queer and bisexual.

In 2022, Henley revealed she had contracted necrotising fasciitis six weeks into studying at Cambridge University, and that the illness had "nearly claimed [her] life".

== Filmography ==
=== Film ===
| Year | Title | Role | Notes |
|---|---|---|---|
| 2005 | The Chronicles of Narnia: The Lion, the Witch and the Wardrobe | Lucy Pevensie | |
| 2008 | The Chronicles of Narnia: Prince Caspian | Lucy Pevensie | |
| 2010 | The Chronicles of Narnia: The Voyage of the Dawn Treader | Lucy Pevensie | |
| 2014 | Perfect Sisters | Beth Anderson | |
| 2015 | The Sisterhood of Night | Mary Warren | |
| 2017 | Access All Areas | Natalie | |
| 2019 | Girl, Sweetvoiced | Woman | |
| 2026 | Turtleneck | Laura | Short |

=== Television ===
| Year | Title | Role | Notes |
|---|---|---|---|
| 2006 | Jane Eyre | Young Jane Eyre | Miniseries |
| 2019 | Untitled Game of Thrones prequel | N/A | Unsold television pilot |
| 2019–2020 | The Spanish Princess | Margaret "Meg" Tudor | Main role |
| 2020 | Prop Culture | Herself | Episode: "Chronicles of Narnia: The Lion, Witch, and the Wardrobe" |
| 2023 | Partygate | Grace Greenwood | Television film |
| 2023–present | The Diplomat | Pensy | Recurring role; 11 episodes |
| 2026 | Dirty Business | Laura Monbiot, MP | Miniseries; 3 episodes |

=== As a director ===
- Tide (2016), short film: director and writer

== Awards and nominations ==
| Year | Work | Award | Category | Result |
|---|---|---|---|---|
| 2006 | The Chronicles of Narnia: The Lion, the Witch and the Wardrobe | Broadcast Film Critics Association Awards | Best Young Actress | Nominated |
| 2006 | The Chronicles of Narnia: The Lion, the Witch and the Wardrobe | Chicago Film Critics Association Awards | Most Promising Performer | Nominated |
| 2006 | The Chronicles of Narnia: The Lion, the Witch and the Wardrobe | Empire Awards | Best Newcomer | Nominated |
| 2006 | The Chronicles of Narnia: The Lion, the Witch and the Wardrobe | Online Film Critics Society Awards | Best Breakthrough Performance | Nominated |
| 2006 | The Chronicles of Narnia: The Lion, the Witch and the Wardrobe | Young Artist Awards | Best Performance in a Feature Film – Young Actress Age Ten or Younger | Won |
| 2008 | The Chronicles of Narnia: Prince Caspian | Nickelodeon UK Kids Choice Awards | Kids Choice Film Actress | Won |
| 2009 | The Chronicles of Narnia: Prince Caspian | Young Artist Awards | Best Performance in a Feature Film – Leading Young Actress | Nominated |
| 2009 | The Chronicles of Narnia: Prince Caspian | Young Artist Awards | Best Performance in a Feature Film – Young Ensemble Cast | Nominated |
| 2011 | The Chronicles of Narnia: The Voyage of the Dawn Treader | Young Artist Awards | Best Performance in a Feature Film – Young Ensemble Cast | Nominated |
