= Kara Hayward =

American actress

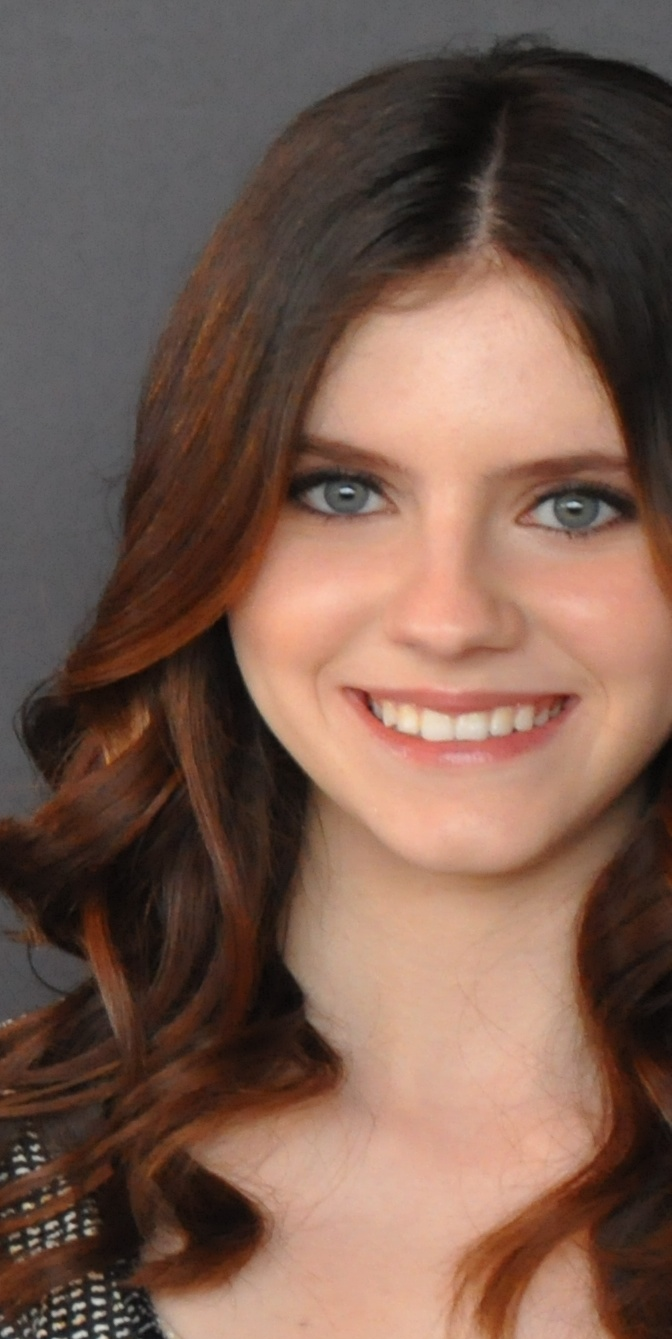
- Hayward in May 2012
- Born: November 17, 1998 (age 27); Andover, Massachusetts, U.S.
- Occupation: Actress
- Years active: 2012–present

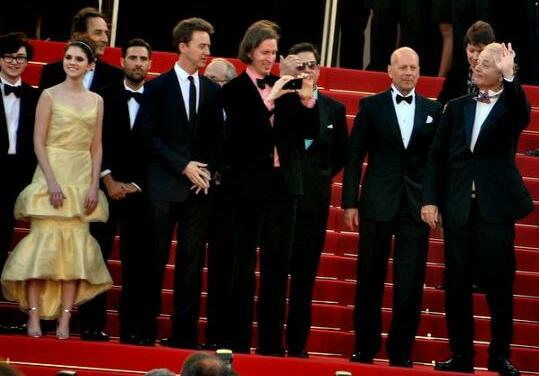
Hayward (left) with Moonrise Kingdom cast (Cannes 2012)

Kara Hayward (born November 17, 1998) is an American actress. She is known for her lead role as Suzy Bishop in the 2012 feature film Moonrise Kingdom, which earned her a nomination for the Young Artist Award for Best Leading Young Actress in a Feature Film in 2013. Two years later, she played Emily Parris, one of the lead roles in The Sisterhood of Night.

== Early life and career ==
Hayward was born and raised in Andover, Massachusetts. She went to an open casting call for Moonrise Kingdom and was chosen for the role of Suzy Bishop. It was her first audition for a feature film. She had no professional acting experience prior to being cast.

USA Today ran a feature on Hayward and her Moonrise Kingdom co-star Jared Gilman on May 22, 2012.

She moved to Los Angeles after graduating high school, saying, "I know what I want to do." Soon after, she got the role of Iris Deerborne in To the Stars.

== Personal life ==
Hayward has been a member of Mensa since she was nine years old. She attended Andover High School, a public school in Andover, Massachusetts.

== Filmography ==
=== Film ===
Year	Title	Role	Notes
2012	Moonrise Kingdom	Suzy Bishop	Won - PFCS Award for Best Ensemble Acting; Nominated - Critics' Choice Movie Award for Best Young Performer; Nominated - CFCA Award for Most Promising Performer; Nominated - Young Artist Award for Best Performance in a Feature Film - Leading Young Actress
2014	The Sisterhood of Night	Emily Parris	
2015	Quitters	Etta	
2015	Fan Girl	Jamie	
2016	Manchester by the Sea	Silvie McCann	
2016	Paterson	Female Student	
2018	Isle of Dogs	Peppermint	Voice only
2019	To the Stars	Iris Deerborne	
2019	Us	Nancy / Syd	
2020	GigiBoy	Gigi	Short film
2020	The Social Dilemma	Cassandra	
2020	Drunk Bus	Kat	
2022	Slayers	Flynn Chambers	

=== Television ===
Year	Title	Role	Notes
2013	Law & Order: Special Victims Unit	Rachel Burns	Episode: "Dissonant Voices"
2013	White Collar	Bee Wolcott	Episode: "Master Plan"
2017	Haters Back Off	Amanda	5 episodes
2022	Roar	Millie	Episode: "The Girl Who Loved Horses"

=== Podcasts ===
Year	Title	Role	Notes	Ref.
2020–2021	The Shadow Diaries	Shana Secco	Voice role	
