= Caryn Waechter =

American filmmaker

Caryn Waechter is an American filmmaker best known for her 2014 debut film The Sisterhood of Night.

== Education ==
Waechter initially attended Columbia University to earn a degree as a film critic. Encouraged by her mentors she switched majors and ended up earning an MFA in directing. While there she met Marilyn Fu who later presented her with the screenplay of The Sisterhood of Night.

== Film career ==
In 2012, Waechter and her team launched a Kickstarter campaign to raise funds for The Sisterhood of Night. The film premiered at the 2014 Woodstock Film Festival. The film was picked up for distribution by Freestyle Releasing and was given a limited theatrical release as well as a release on VOD in April 2015.
