= List of Live with Kelly and Ryan episodes =

Live with Kelly and Ryan is the 2017–2023 title of a long-running American syndicated morning talk show. Kelly Ripa and Ryan Seacrest are the hosts in that period.

== Season 29 (2017) ==
=== May 2017 ===
Date	Co-hosts	"Host chat"	Guests / segments	"Kelly and Ryan's Inbox"
May 1	Kelly Ripa & Ryan Seacrest	Yes	Chris Pratt, PJ Ball	No
May 2	Kelly Ripa & Ryan Seacrest	Yes	Kurt Russell, Beth Behrs, Nancy Kerrigan & Artem Chigvintsev, Cupping Therapy	No
May 3	Kelly Ripa & Ryan Seacrest	Yes	Zoe Saldaña, Jeff Garlin, Partner Yoga	Yes
May 4	Kelly Ripa & Ryan Seacrest	Yes	Richard Gere, Lana Parrilla, Prince Royce	Yes
May 5	Kelly Ripa & Ryan Seacrest	Yes	Diane Lane, Elisabeth Moss, Chris Byrne, Diana Krall	No
May 8	Kelly Ripa & Ryan Seacrest	Yes	Seth Meyers, Ben Platt	No
May 9	Kelly Ripa & Ryan Seacrest	Yes	Kevin Bacon, Crav Maga, Bonner Bolton & Sharna Burgess	Yes
May 10	Kelly Ripa & Ryan Seacrest	Yes	Matthew Perry, Summer Eye Trends	Yes
May 11	Kelly Ripa & Ryan Seacrest	Yes	Glenn Close, Guillermo Diaz	Yes
May 12	Kelly Ripa & Ryan Seacrest	Yes	Aziz Ansari, Indoor Skydiving	Yes
May 15	Kelly Ripa & Ryan Seacrest	Yes	Tony Goldwyn, Derek Hough, Ryan Goes Backstage at Wango Tango, Four Wheel Family Face-Off Day #1	No
May 16	Kelly Ripa & Ryan Seacrest	Yes	Jeffrey Tambor, Ben Falcone, Kára McCullough, Four Wheel Family Face-Off Day #2	No
May 17	Kelly Ripa & Ryan Seacrest	Yes	Debra Messing, Gina Rodriguez, Four Wheel Family Face-Off Day #3	Yes
May 18	Kelly Ripa & Ryan Seacrest	Yes	Kerry Washington, Simone Biles & Sasha Farber, Four Wheel Family Face-Off Day #4	No
May 19	Kelly Ripa & Ryan Seacrest	Yes	Naomi Watts, Luke Robitaille, Four Wheel Family Face-Off Winner Announced	No
May 22	Kelly Ripa & Ryan Seacrest	Yes	Zac Efron, Rachel Lindsay	No
May 23	Kelly Ripa & Ryan Seacrest	Yes	Priyanka Chopra, Abigail Breslin	No
May 24	Kelly Ripa & Ryan Seacrest	Yes	Chris Pine, Rashad Jennings & Emma Slater, David Ross & Lindsay Arnold	Yes
May 25	Kelly Ripa & Ryan Seacrest	Yes	Jamie Foxx, Alexandra Daddario	No
May 26	Kelly Ripa & Ryan Seacrest	Yes	Gal Gadot, Alan Alda, Normani Kordei & Val Chmerkovskiy, LIVE's Eat It, Like It, Share It Summer Cook-Off – Kevin Curry	No
May 29	Kelly Ripa & Ryan Seacrest	Yes	Ricky Gervais, Chrissy Metz, Nelly	Yes
May 30	Kelly Ripa & Ryan Seacrest	Yes	Kal Penn, Ali Wentworth	Yes
May 31	Kelly Ripa & Ryan Seacrest	Yes	Vanessa Williams, Louie Anderson	Yes

=== June 2017 ===
Date	Co-hosts	"Host chat"	Guests / segments	"Kelly and Ryan's Inbox"
June 1	Kelly Ripa & Ryan Seacrest	Yes	Mary Steenburgen, Joseph Fiennes	No
June 2	Kelly Ripa & Ryan Seacrest	Yes	Cat Deeley, LIVE's Eat It, Like It, Share It Summer Cook-Off – Geoffrey Zakarian	No
June 5	Kelly Ripa & Ryan Seacrest	Yes	LIVE! from Niagara Falls: Justin Trudeau, Tatiana Maslany, Erin Bowman, Ryan Experiences Niagara Falls	No
June 6	Kelly Ripa & Ryan Seacrest	Yes	LIVE! from Niagara Falls: Howie Mandel, Nathan Fillion, French Montana & Swae Lee, Kelly Celebrates Her Son's Birthday	No
June 7	Kelly Ripa & Ryan Seacrest	Yes	Salma Hayek, Riley Keough, Ananya Vinay	No
June 8	Kelly Ripa & Ryan Seacrest	Yes	Laura Prepon, Steven Yeun, Michael Franti & Spearhead	No
June 9	Kelly Ripa & Ryan Seacrest	Yes	Will Arnett, Kate Mara, LIVE's Eat It, Like It, Share It Summer Cook-Off – Brothers Green	No
June 12	Kelly Ripa & Ryan Seacrest	Yes	Ethan Hawke, Tituss Burgess, DJ Khaled	No
June 13	Kelly Ripa & Ryan Seacrest	Yes	Kate McKinnon, Uzo Aduba	Yes
June 14	Kelly Ripa & Ryan Seacrest	Yes	Taylor Schilling, Sutton Foster, Sabrina Carpenter	No
June 15	Kelly Ripa & Ryan Seacrest	Yes	Larry the Cable Guy, Claire Foy, Kelly in Dad Bod Bathing Suit	Yes
June 16	Kelly Ripa & Ryan Seacrest	Yes	Scarlett Johansson, Danai Gurira, LIVE's Eat It, Like It, Share It Summer Cook-Off – Jen Phanomrat	No
June 19	Kelly Ripa & Ryan Seacrest	Yes	Dwyane Wade, Ilana Glazer	Yes
June 26	Ryan Seacrest & Cat Deeley	Yes	Marisa Tomei, 50 Cent	No
June 27	Ryan Seacrest & Busy Philipps	Yes	Justin Hartley, Russell Westbrook, James Blunt	Yes
June 28	Ryan Seacrest & Busy Philipps	Yes	Ansel Elgort, Dua Lipa, Crunch Bongo Drum Workout	No
June 29	Ryan Seacrest & Carrie Ann Inaba	Yes	Hilary Duff, Scott Wolf	Yes
June 30	Ryan Seacrest & Carrie Ann Inaba	Yes	Josh Duhamel, Tom Holland, LIVE's Eat It, Like It, Share It Summer Cook-Off – Josh Elkin	No

=== July 2017 ===
Date	Co-hosts	"Host chat"	Guests / segments	"Kelly and Ryan's Inbox"
July 3	Ryan Seacrest & Cat Deeley	Yes	Vanessa Hudgens, Nick Carter	No
July 4	Kelly Ripa & Ryan Seacrest	Yes	LIVE's July 4 Party: Andy Cohen, LIVE's July 4 Games	No
July 5	Kelly Ripa & Jerry O'Connell	Yes	Ronda Rousey, Omari Hardwick	Yes
July 6	Kelly Ripa & David Muir	Yes	Kyle MacLachlan, Jane Lynch	Yes
July 7	Kelly Ripa & Van Jones	Yes	Olivia Wilde, Bernadette Peters, LIVE's Eat It, Like It, Share It Summer Cook-Off – iJustine	No
July 10	Kelly Ripa & Ryan Seacrest	Yes	Ryan Phillippe, Jill Kargman	No
July 11	Kelly Ripa & Ryan Seacrest	Yes	Heidi Klum, Chris Colfer, Sabrina Carpenter	Yes
July 12	Kelly Ripa & Ryan Seacrest	Yes	Judd Apatow, Billy Ray Cyrus, Charlie Wilson	No
July 13	Kelly Ripa & Ryan Seacrest	Yes	Kyra Sedgwick, Fred Savage	Yes
July 14	Kelly Ripa & Ryan Seacrest	Yes	Woody Harrelson, Jenny Slate, LIVE's Eat It, Like It, Share It Summer Cook-Off – Hilah Johnson	No
July 17	Kelly Ripa & Ryan Seacrest	Yes	Maya Rudolph, Dove Cameron	No
July 18	Kelly Ripa & Ryan Seacrest	Yes	Keegan-Michael Key, James Wolk	No
July 19	Kelly Ripa & Ryan Seacrest	Yes	Queen Latifah, Sofia Carson, Steve Aoki	Yes
July 20	Kelly Ripa & Ryan Seacrest	Yes	Charlize Theron, Cara Delevingne, Andrew Zimmern	No
July 21	Kelly Ripa & Ryan Seacrest	Yes	Vice President Al Gore, Jenna Dewan Tatum, Jonathan & Drew Scott, LIVE's Eat It, Like It, Share It Summer Cook-Off – Hannah Hart	No
July 24	Kelly Ripa & Anderson Cooper	Yes	Matt Bomer, Paul Bettany, AJR	Yes
July 25	Kelly Ripa & Anderson Cooper	Yes	Kelsey Grammer, Debi Mazar, Sara Evans	Yes
July 26	Kelly Ripa & Anderson Cooper	Yes	Lily Collins, Matt Iseman	No
July 27	Kelly Ripa & Andy Cohen	Yes	John Boyega, Betty Gilpin	Yes
July 28	Kelly Ripa & Andy Cohen	Yes	Paula Patton, Laurie Gelman, LIVE's Eat It, Like It, Share It Summer Cook-Off – Rhett and Link	No
July 31	Ryan Seacrest & Busy Philipps	Yes	Matthew McConaughey, James Van Der Beek, LIVE's Summer Selfie Makeovers	Yes

=== August 2017 ===
Date	Co-hosts	"Host chat"	Guests / segments	"Kelly and Ryan's Inbox"
August 1	Ryan Seacrest & Carrie Ann Inaba	Yes	Idris Elba, Lizzie Olsen, LIVE's Summer Selfie Makeovers	Yes
August 2	Ryan Seacrest & Carrie Ann Inaba	Yes	Jeremy Renner, Cayson Hayes, LIVE's Summer Selfie Makeovers	Yes
August 3	Ryan Seacrest & Jenna Dewan Tatum	Yes	Halle Berry, George Thorogood, LIVE's Summer Selfie Makeovers	No
August 4	Ryan Seacrest & Busy Philipps	Yes	Jessica Biel, LIVE's Summer Selfie Makeovers	Yes
August 7	Ryan Seacrest & Sisanie	Yes	Billy Eichner, Goo Goo Dolls, Battle of the Web Stars – Colleen Ballinger & Joey Graceffa	Yes
August 8	Ryan Seacrest & Rita Ora	Yes	Chris O'Dowd, Rachel Lindsay & Bryan Abasolo, Battle of the Web Stars – Geoffrey Zakarian & Hannah Hart	No
August 9	Ryan Seacrest & Eva Longoria	Yes	Brie Larson, Rick Fox, Battle of the Web Stars – Kevin Lieber and Jake Roper	No
August 10	Ryan Seacrest & Randy Jackson	Yes	Anthony Anderson, Bebe Rexha, Battle of the Web Stars – Matt Steffanina and Kyle Hanagami	Yes
August 11	Ryan Seacrest & Lisa Rinna	Yes	Kate Beckinsale, Max Greenfield, Battle of the Web Stars – Manny Mua & Patrick Star	No
August 14	Kelly Ripa & Andy Cohen	Yes	Bill Pullman, David Harbour	Yes
August 28	Ryan Seacrest & Kim Kardashian West	Yes	Eric Dane, Kellie Pickler, Extreme Pumpkin Carving	No

== Season 30 (2017–2018) ==
=== September 2017 ===
Date	Co-hosts	"Host chat"	Guests / segments	"Kelly and Ryan's Inbox"
September 4	Kelly Ripa & Ryan Seacrest	Yes	LIVE's #EndofSummer Labor Day Party: Maggie Gyllenhaal, Grace VanderWaal, Peggy Fischer, LIVE's #EndofSummer Games	No
September 5	Kelly Ripa & Ryan Seacrest	Yes	Sam Heughan, Henrik Lundqvist, LIVE's Dressing Room Makeovers Reveal, LIVE is LIVE Week – Facebook Pre-Show	No
September 6	Kelly Ripa & Ryan Seacrest	Yes	Liev Schreiber, Taylor Kitsch, Rosanna Pansino, LIVE is LIVE Week – Facebook Livestream	No
September 7	Kelly Ripa & Ryan Seacrest	Yes	Seth MacFarlane, Caitriona Balfe, Lindsey Stirling, LIVE is LIVE Week – Kelly's Instagram Live After Show	No
September 8	Kelly Ripa & Ryan Seacrest	Yes	Gwendoline Christie, Fifth Harmony, LIVE is LIVE Week – Ryan's Instagram Live After Show	No
September 11	Kelly Ripa & Ryan Seacrest	Yes	Chris Harrison, Sloane Stephens, LIVE's Totes Amaze Week – Isaiah McDonald	No
September 12	Kelly Ripa & Ryan Seacrest	Yes	Kirsten Dunst, Gabriel Macht, Cara Mund, LIVE's Totes Amaze Week – World Beard and Moustache Championships	No
September 13	Kelly Ripa & Ryan Seacrest	Yes	Julianne Moore, Alan Cumming, LIVE's Totes Amaze Week – Tao Porchon-Lynch	No
September 14	Kelly Ripa & Ryan Seacrest	Yes	Ice-T, LIVE's Totes Amaze Week – Kadan and Brooklyn Rockett	Yes
September 15	Kelly Ripa & Ryan Seacrest	Yes	Jeffrey Tambor, Julia Stiles, LIVE's Totes Amaze Week – Frank Montgomery & Chicklet	No
September 18	Kelly Ripa & Ryan Seacrest	Yes	Ben McKenzie, Shonda Rhimes, LIVE's Do It Week – Ryan Goes Back Home	Yes
September 19	Kelly Ripa & Ryan Seacrest	Yes	Demi Moore, David Muir, LIVE's Do It Week – Kelly Learns to Tap Dance	No
September 20	Kelly Ripa & Ryan Seacrest	Yes	Ben Stiller, LIVE's Do It Week – Ryan Teaches Kelly How to DJ	Yes
September 21	Kelly Ripa & Ryan Seacrest	Yes	Emma Stone, Joanne Froggatt, LIVE's Do It Week – Ryan Works Out with the Staff	Yes
September 22	Kelly Ripa & Ryan Seacrest	Yes	Colin Firth, Sonya Fitzpatrick, LIVE's Do It Week – Kelly Goes to Kindergarten	No
September 25	Kelly Ripa & Ryan Seacrest	Yes	Kristin Chenoweth, Jussie Smollett, Ryan Goes to iHeartRadio Music Festival, LIVE's Pumped Up Week – Human Bowling	No
September 26	Kelly Ripa & Ryan Seacrest	Yes	Michael Weatherly, Katy Mixon, Chris Janson, LIVE's Pumped Up Week – Sumo Wrestling	No
September 27	Kelly Ripa & Ryan Seacrest	Yes	Kiefer Sutherland, David Boreanaz, LIVE's Pumped Up Week – Bungee Run	No
September 28	Kelly Ripa & Ryan Seacrest	Yes	Viola Davis, Adam Scott, LIVE's Pumped Up Week – Gladiator Joust	Yes
September 29	Kelly Ripa & Ryan Seacrest	Yes	Tom Selleck, Mark Feuerstein, LIVE's Pumped Up Week – Crisscross Collison Course	No

=== October 2017 ===
Date	Co-hosts	"Host chat"	Guests / segments	"Kelly and Ryan's Inbox"
October 2	Kelly Ripa & Ryan Seacrest	Yes	Patricia Heaton, Jensen Ackles	No
October 3	Kelly Ripa & Ryan Seacrest	Yes	Sarah Silverman, Terry Crews, LIVE's Birthday Games	No
October 4	Kelly Ripa & Ryan Seacrest	Yes	Harrison Ford, Uzo Aduba, LIVE's Birthday Games	No
October 5	Kelly Ripa & Ryan Seacrest	Yes	Trevor Noah, Anna Camp, LIVE's Birthday Games	No
October 6	Kelly Ripa & Ryan Seacrest	Yes	Kate Winslet, Lana Parrilla, Adam Savage & Michael Stevens, LIVE's Birthday Games	No
October 9	Kelly Ripa & Ryan Seacrest	Yes	Tyler Perry, Grant Show, Neon Trees	No
October 10	Kelly Ripa & Ryan Seacrest	Yes	Tracee Ellis Ross, Jackie Chan, LIVE's Banana Bread Bake Off – Shayna Taylor	No
October 11	Kelly Ripa & Ryan Seacrest	Yes	Jimmy Fallon, KJ Apa, LIVE's Banana Bread Bake Off – Laurie Gelman	No
October 12	Kelly Ripa & Ryan Seacrest	Yes	Gerard Butler, Lea Michele, Rhett & Link	No
October 13	Kelly Ripa & Ryan Seacrest	Yes	Miles Teller, Michelle Dockery, Lauri Quinn Loewenberg	No
October 16	Kelly Ripa & Ryan Seacrest	Yes	Jimmy Kimmel, LIVE's Style Regrets Makeover Week	No
October 17	Kelly Ripa & Ryan Seacrest	Yes	Clive Owen, Marisol Nichols, LIVE's Style Regrets Makeover Week	Yes
October 18	Kelly Ripa & Ryan Seacrest	Yes	Oprah Winfrey, Jonathan Groff, LIVE's Style Regrets Makeover Week	No
October 19	Kelly Ripa & Ryan Seacrest	Yes	Josh Brolin, Lauren Cohan, LIVE's Style Regrets Makeover Week	Yes
October 20	Kelly Ripa & Ryan Seacrest	Yes	Kyra Sedgwick, Anne Heche, America's Largest Pumpkin, LIVE's Style Regrets Makeover Week	No
October 23	Kelly Ripa & Ryan Seacrest	Yes	Anna Faris, Colleen Ballinger, Halloween Tips and Tricks, LIVE's Halloween Countdown Games	No
October 24	Kelly Ripa & Ryan Seacrest	Yes	Blake Lively, Randall Park, LIVE's Halloween Countdown Games	Yes
October 25	Kelly Ripa & Ryan Seacrest	Yes	Heather Graham, Cole Sprouse, LIVE's Halloween Countdown Games	No
October 26	Kelly Ripa & Ryan Seacrest	Yes	Hugh Laurie, Science Bob, LIVE's Halloween Countdown Games	Yes
October 27	Kelly Ripa & Ryan Seacrest	Yes	Eva Longoria, Milo Ventimiglia, LIVE's Halloween Countdown Games	No
October 30	Kelly Ripa & Ryan Seacrest	Yes	Chris Hemsworth, Millie Bobby Brown, Extreme Pumpkin Carving	No
October 31	Kelly Ripa & Ryan Seacrest	Yes	Kelly and Ryan's Best Halloween Show Ever: Look What You Made Us Do, Andy Cohen, Jonathan & Drew Scott, LIVE's Annual Halloween Costume Contest	No

=== November 2017 ===
Date	Co-hosts	"Host chat"	Guests / segments	"Kelly and Ryan's Inbox"
November 1	Kelly Ripa & Ryan Seacrest	Yes	Kal Penn, Derek Hough, Peter Gros	No
November 2	Kelly Ripa & Ryan Seacrest	Yes	Kate Hudson, Dr. Greg Yapalater	No
November 3	Kelly Ripa & Ryan Seacrest	Yes	Blake Shelton, Justin Hartley, Joanna Jedrzejczyk	No
November 6	Kelly Ripa & Ryan Seacrest	Yes	Shalane Flanagan, Josh Gad, Gina Rodriguez	Yes
November 7	Kelly Ripa & Ryan Seacrest	Yes	Will Ferrell, Kate Bosworth, Why Don't We	No
November 8	Kelly Ripa & Ryan Seacrest	Yes	Mark Wahlberg, Guillermo Diaz, Betsy Wolfe & Jason Mraz	No
November 9	Kelly Ripa & Ryan Seacrest	Yes	Kenneth Branagh, Ellen Pompeo, Daveed Diggs	No
November 10	Ryan Seacrest & Jenna Dewan Tatum	Yes	John Lithgow, Jay Pharoah	Yes
November 13	Kelly Ripa & Ryan Seacrest	Yes	William H. Macy, Mary J. Blige, LIVE's That's My Baby Thanksgiving Cooking Week – Connie Seacrest	No
November 14	Kelly Ripa & Ryan Seacrest	Yes	Uma Thurman, Josh Hutcherson, LIVE's That's My Baby Thanksgiving Cooking Week – Jamie Gelman	No
November 15	Kelly Ripa & Ryan Seacrest	Yes	Gal Gadot, Gary Oldman, LIVE's That's My Baby Thanksgiving Cooking Week – Donatella Arapia	No
November 16	Kelly Ripa & Ryan Seacrest	Yes	Jeremy Irons, Bellamy Young, LIVE's That's My Baby Thanksgiving Cooking Week – Lola Consuelos	Yes
November 17	Kelly Ripa & Ryan Seacrest	Yes	Jeremy Irons, Bellamy Young, LIVE's That's My Baby Thanksgiving Cooking Week – Myron & Michael Mixon	No
November 20	Kelly Ripa & Ryan Seacrest	Yes	Denzel Washington, Winner of LIVE's Bow Wow Wow Contest Winner Announced	Yes
November 21	Kelly Ripa & Ryan Seacrest	Yes	Michelle Pfeiffer, Benjamin Bratt, Kelsea Ballerini	No
November 22	Kelly Ripa & Ryan Seacrest	Yes	Kelly Clarkson, Gaten Matarazzo	No
November 27	Kelly Ripa & Ryan Seacrest	Yes	Carol Burnett, Lili Reinhart, Katharine McPhee	No
November 28	Kelly Ripa & Ryan Seacrest	Yes	Daisy Ridley, Jeffrey Donovan	No
November 29	Kelly Ripa & Ryan Seacrest	Yes	John Boyega, Rachel Bloom, Demi-Leigh Nel-Peters	No
November 30	Kelly Ripa & Ryan Seacrest	Yes	Debra Messing, Ben Mendelsohn, Old Dominion	No

=== December 2017 ===
Date	Co-hosts	"Host chat"	Guests / segments	"Kelly and Ryan's Inbox"
December 1	Kelly Ripa & Ryan Seacrest	Yes	Terrence Howard, Kumail Nanjiani, Holiday Rompers	No
December 4	Kelly Ripa & David Muir	Yes	Rene Russo, Saoirse Ronan, LIVE's Holiday Hits Week – Fantasia	No
December 5	Kelly Ripa & Ryan Seacrest	Yes	James Franco, Lily James, LIVE's Holiday Hits Week – Brett Young	No
December 6	Kelly Ripa & Ryan Seacrest	Yes	Gwendoline Christie, Matt Smith, LIVE's Holiday Hits Week – Seal	No
December 7	Kelly Ripa & Ryan Seacrest	Yes	Bob Odenkirk, Miranda Cosgrove, LIVE's Holiday Hits Week – James Arthur	No
December 8	Kelly Ripa & Ryan Seacrest	Yes	Madonna, Anderson Cooper, LIVE's Holiday Hits Week – 98 Degrees	No
December 11	Kelly Ripa & Ryan Seacrest	Yes	Zendaya, Bernadette Peters, LIVE's Holiday Gift Guide – DIY Gifts	No
December 12	Kelly Ripa & Ryan Seacrest	Yes	Matt Damon, Noah Schnapp, LIVE's Holiday Gift Guide – Gifts for Women	No
December 13	Kelly Ripa & Ryan Seacrest	Yes	Margot Robbie, Christina Hendricks, LIVE's Holiday Gift Guide – Gifts for Teens	No
December 14	Kelly Ripa & Ryan Seacrest	Yes	Laura Dern, Diane Kruger, LIVE's Holiday Gift Guide – Chris Byrne	No
December 15	Kelly Ripa & Ryan Seacrest	Yes	Kate McKinnon, Hailee Steinfeld, LIVE's Holiday Gift Guide – Tech Gifts	No
December 18	Kelly Ripa & Anderson Cooper	Yes	Jessica Chastain, LIVE's 'Tis the Season Week – Gift Wrapping, LIVE's Merry Money Games	No
December 19	Kelly Ripa & Scott Wolf	Yes	Seth MacFarlane, Jojo Siwa, LIVE's 'Tis the Season Week – Latke Making, LIVE's Merry Money Games	No
December 20	Kelly Ripa & Andy Cohen	Yes	Christoph Waltz, Kandi Burruss, LIVE's Merry Money Games	Yes
December 21	Kelly Ripa & Ryan Seacrest	Yes	LIVE's Holiday Sweater Party: Kate Winslet, Jonathan Groff, LIVE's 'Tis the Season Week – Radio City Rockettes, LIVE's Merry Money Games	No
December 22	Kelly Ripa & Ryan Seacrest	Yes	Kelly and Ryan's Christmas Party: Hugh Jackman, Brett Eldredge, LIVE's 'Tis the Season Week – Fondue, Santa	No
December 25	Kelly Ripa	Yes	Kelly's Christmas Flashback Special	No
December 26	Kelly Ripa & Ryan Seacrest	Yes	Annette Bening, Josh Lucas, Seal	No
December 27	Kelly Ripa & Ryan Seacrest	Yes	LIVE's Viewer's Choice Show 2017	No

=== January 2018 ===
Date	Co-hosts	"Host chat"	Guests / segments	"Kelly and Ryan's Inbox"
January 8	Kelly Ripa & Ryan Seacrest	Yes	Liam Neeson, Molly Shannon, LIVE's Jan-YOU-ary Week – Whole30	No
January 9	Kelly Ripa & Ryan Seacrest	Yes	Hugh Grant, Patrick Wilson, LIVE's Jan-YOU-ary Week – The Keto Diet	No
January 10	Kelly Ripa & Ryan Seacrest	Yes	Taraji P. Henson, Matthew Rhys, LIVE's Jan-YOU-ary Week – Spices	Yes
January 11	Kelly Ripa & Ryan Seacrest	Yes	Uma Thurman, Sara Ramirez, LIVE's Jan-YOU-ary Week – The How Not to Die Diet	No
January 12	Kelly Ripa & Ryan Seacrest	Yes	Donald Sutherland, Jerry O'Connell, LIVE's Jan-YOU-ary Week – Crush Those Cravings	No
January 15	Kelly Ripa & Ryan Seacrest	Yes	50 Cent, Camila Mendes, LIVE's Jan-YOU-ary Week – Powerball Pilates	No
January 16	Kelly Ripa & Ryan Seacrest	Yes	Ricky Martin, Matt Czuchry, LIVE's Jan-YOU-ary Week – Hybrid Body Boost Workout	No
January 17	Kelly Ripa & Ryan Seacrest	Yes	J. K. Simmons, Darren Criss, LIVE's Jan-YOU-ary Week – Getting Fit with Household Items	No
January 18	Kelly Ripa & Ryan Seacrest	Yes	Catherine Zeta-Jones, Anna Paquin, LIVE's Jan-YOU-ary Week – Michael Matthews	No
January 19	Kelly Ripa & Ryan Seacrest	Yes	Dakota Fanning, Edgar Ramirez, LIVE's Jan-YOU-ary Week – DanzaTone Workout	No
January 22	Kelly Ripa & Ryan Seacrest	Yes	Sharon Stone, Clayne Crawford, Andy Grammer	No
January 23	Kelly Ripa & Ryan Seacrest	Yes	David Duchovny, Susan Kelechi Watson	No
January 24	Kelly Ripa & Ryan Seacrest	Yes	James Corden, Eugene Levy	No
January 25	Kelly Ripa & Ryan Seacrest	Yes	Ricky Gervais, Toni Braxton	No
January 26	Ryan Seacrest & Maria Menounos	Yes	Willem Dafoe, Rachel Brosnahan	No
January 29	Kelly Ripa & Ryan Seacrest	Yes	Cat Deeley, Joel Kinnaman, Super Bowl Pig Race	No
January 30	Kelly Ripa & Ryan Seacrest	Yes	Dylan McDermott, Katie Lowes, LIVE's Jan-YOU-Ary – Know Your Skin	No
January 31	Kelly Ripa & Ryan Seacrest	Yes	Chrissy Teigen, Scott Rogowsky, LIVE's Jan-YOU-Ary – Baby and Toddler Basics	No

=== February 2018 ===
Date	Co-hosts	"Host chat"	Guests / segments	"Kelly and Ryan's Inbox"
February 1	Kelly Ripa & Ryan Seacrest	Yes	Rita Ora, Lucy Lawless, LIVE's Big Game Week Final Cook-Off	No
February 2	Kelly Ripa & Ryan Seacrest	Yes	Greg Kinnear, Ato Essandoh, Flower Arrangements	No
February 5	Kelly Ripa & Ryan Seacrest	Yes	LIVE! in The Bahamas: Heather Graham, Arie Luyendyk Jr., Dolphin Yoga, In Real Life	No
February 6	Kelly Ripa & Ryan Seacrest	Yes	LIVE! in The Bahamas: Taylor Kitsch, NeNe Leakes, Ryan's Exumas Adventure, Da Rhythm Band	No
February 7	Kelly Ripa & Ryan Seacrest	Yes	LIVE! in The Bahamas: Whitney Cummings, LIVE's Sink or Sail Family Challenge, Kelly's Catamaran Adventure, Baha Men	No
February 8	Kelly Ripa & Ryan Seacrest	Yes	LIVE! in The Bahamas: Lisa Rinna, Rachael Harris, Ira Storr and the Spank Band	No
February 9	Kelly Ripa & Ryan Seacrest	Yes	Tyra Banks, Julie Chen	No
February 12	Kelly Ripa & Ryan Seacrest	Yes	Gael Garcia Bernal, Danai Gurira, Malcolm Jenkins	No
February 13	Kelly Ripa & Ryan Seacrest	Yes	Anna Chlumsky, Becki Newton, Phillip Phillips	No
February 14	Kelly Ripa & Ryan Seacrest	Yes	Lupita Nyong'o, Elizabeth Marvel, Franco Noriega	No
February 15	Kelly Ripa & Ryan Seacrest	Yes	Red Gerard, Ashley Graham, Carly Pearce	Yes
February 16	Kelly Ripa & Ryan Seacrest	Yes	Eddie Redmayne, Bethenny Frankel, Friday Replay	Yes
February 19	Kelly Ripa & Ryan Seacrest	Yes	Cheryl Hines, Letitia Wright, Presidential Movie Game	No
February 20	Kelly Ripa & Ryan Seacrest	Yes	Ludacris, Constance Zimmer, Daytona 500 Winner	No
February 21	Kelly Ripa & Ryan Seacrest	Yes	Oscar Isaac, Katy Mixon, Lance Ulanoff	No
February 22	Kelly Ripa & Ryan Seacrest	Yes	Sarah Jessica Parker, Chloe Kim, Shiri Appleby	No
February 23	Kelly Ripa & Ryan Seacrest	Yes	Ben McKenzie, Mae Whitman, Chris Byrne	No
February 26	Kelly Ripa & Ryan Seacrest	Yes	Laverne Cox, Freddie Highmore, LIVE's Oscar Countdown Games	No
February 27	Kelly Ripa & Ryan Seacrest	Yes	Kiefer Sutherland, Christine Baranski, High Valley, LIVE's Oscar Countdown Games	No
February 28	Kelly Ripa & Ryan Seacrest	Yes	Dennis Quaid, Maia and Alex Shibutani, LIVE's Oscar Countdown Games	No

=== March 2018 ===
Date	Co-hosts	"Host chat"	Guests / segments	"Kelly and Ryan's Inbox"
March 1	Kelly Ripa & Ryan Seacrest	Yes	Jeff Daniels, Winston Duke, Kikkan Randall & Jessie Diggins, LIVE's Oscar Countdown Games	No
March 2	Kelly Ripa & Ryan Seacrest	Yes	LIVE's Pre-Oscar Celebration: Ellen Burstyn, Carson Kressley, Oscar Memories and Flashbacks, LIVE's Oscar Countdown Games	No
March 5	Kelly Ripa & Ryan Seacrest	Yes	LIVE's After Oscar Show: Allison Janney, Jimmy Kimmel, Maria Menounos, MAX feat. gnash	No
March 6	Kelly Ripa & Ryan Seacrest	Yes	Luke Bryan, Jussie Smollett	No
March 7	Kelly Ripa & Ryan Seacrest	Yes	Arie Luyendyk Jr., Lucy Hale	No
March 8	Kelly Ripa & Ryan Seacrest	Yes	Andrew Lloyd Webber, Katherine Langford	No
March 9	Kelly Ripa & Ryan Seacrest	Yes	Mindy Kaling, Josh Henderson, Kelly Auditions for American Idol	No
March 12	Kelly Ripa & Ryan Seacrest	Yes	Peter Krause, Chris Sullivan, LIVE's March Money Madness Week – Saving on Travel	No
March 13	Kelly Ripa & Ryan Seacrest	Yes	Alan Cumming, Colin Jost, LIVE's March Money Madness Week – Finance Apps	No
March 14	Kelly Ripa & Ryan Seacrest	Yes	Alicia Vikander, Skeet Ulrich, LIVE's March Money Madness Week – Money Mistakes	No
March 15	Kelly Ripa & Ryan Seacrest	Yes	Connie Britton, Brian Tyree Henry, LIVE's March Money Madness Week – The Great Money Quiz	No
March 16	Kelly Ripa & Ryan Seacrest	Yes	Josh Radnor, Josh Groban, LIVE's March Money Madness Week – Saving for Retirement	No
March 19	Ryan Seacrest & Maria Menounos	Yes	Hilary Swank, Scott Eastwood	No
March 20	Ryan Seacrest & Maria Menounos	Yes	John Boyega, Patti LaBelle, Rick Schwartz	No
March 21	Ryan Seacrest & Carrie Ann Inaba	Yes	Jay Pharoah, Bella Thorne	Yes
March 22	Ryan Seacrest & Carrie Ann Inaba	Yes	Tyler Perry, Jason George, O.A.R.	No
March 23	Ryan Seacrest & Sisanie	Yes	Taraji P. Henson, Patrick Schwarzenegger, Daphne Oz	No

=== April 2018 ===
Date	Co-hosts	"Host chat"	Guests / segments	"Kelly and Ryan's Inbox"
April 2	Kelly Ripa & Ryan Seacrest	Yes	Leslie Mann, Steve Zahn, LIVE's New York Auto Show Week – Sporty Cars	No
April 3	Kelly Ripa & Ryan Seacrest	Yes	Tracy Morgan, Laura Prepon, LIVE's New York Auto Show Week – Crossover Cars	No
April 4	Kelly Ripa & Ryan Seacrest	Yes	Edie Falco, Ice-T, LIVE's New York Auto Show Week – Green Cars	No
April 5	Kelly Ripa & Ryan Seacrest	Yes	Jared Leto, Sandra Oh, LIVE's New York Auto Show Week- "Rugged Yet Refined" Cars	No
April 6	Kelly Ripa & Ryan Seacrest	Yes	John Krasinski, Nicole "Snooki" Polizzi, LIVE's New York Auto Show Week – Sedans	No
April 9	Kelly Ripa & Ryan Seacrest	Yes	Joshua Jackson, Malin Akerman	Yes
April 10	Kelly Ripa & Ryan Seacrest	Yes	Jon Hamm, Louie Anderson, Patrick Reed	No
April 11	Kelly Ripa & Ryan Seacrest	Yes	Kerry Washington, Busy Philipps, David Foster	No
April 12	Kelly Ripa & Ryan Seacrest	Yes	Amy Schumer, Aisha Tyler	No
April 13	Kelly Ripa & Ryan Seacrest	Yes	Emily Blunt, January Jones, Guy Fieri	No
April 16	Kelly Ripa & Ryan Seacrest	Yes	Parker Posey, Joe Morton, Pentatonix	No
April 17	Kelly Ripa & Ryan Seacrest	Yes	Laurie Metcalf, Emily Ratajkowski	No
April 18	Kelly Ripa & Ryan Seacrest	Yes	Joel McHale, Letitia Wright	No
April 19	Kelly Ripa & Ryan Seacrest	Yes	Antonio Banderas, Paula Patton, Max Frost	No
April 20	Kelly Ripa & Ryan Seacrest	Yes	Anthony Mackie, Auliʻi Cravalho	No
April 23	Kelly Ripa & Mark Consuelos	Yes	Billy Crudup, Wendi McLendon-Covey, LIVE's Beauty Week – Botox	No
April 24	Kelly Ripa & Ryan Seacrest	Yes	Sting & Shaggy, Henry Winkler, LIVE's Beauty Week – Beauty Breakthroughs	No
April 25	Kelly Ripa & Ryan Seacrest	Yes	Hank Azaria, Ali Wentworth, LIVE's Beauty Week – CoolSculpting	No
April 26	Kelly Ripa & Ryan Seacrest	Yes	Priyanka Chopra, Hailey Baldwin, LIVE's Beauty Week – Tips for Aging Gracefully	No
April 27	Kelly Ripa & Ryan Seacrest	Yes	Adam Sandler, Josh Holloway, LIVE's Beauty Week – Microblading	No
April 30	Kelly Ripa & Ryan Seacrest	Yes	Lucy Liu, David Duchovny, Anne-Marie, Kelly and Ryan's Anniversary Celebration Week – The First Show	No

=== May 2018 ===
Date	Co-hosts	"Host chat"	Guests / segments	"Kelly and Ryan's Inbox"
May 1	Kelly Ripa & Ryan Seacrest	Yes	Chris O'Donnell, RuPaul, Kelly and Ryan's Anniversary Celebration Week – Halloween	No
May 2	Kelly Ripa & Ryan Seacrest	Yes	Helen Hunt, RuPaul, Kelly and Ryan's Anniversary Celebration Week – In and Out of LIVE's Kitchen	No
May 3	Kelly Ripa & Ryan Seacrest	Yes	Roseanne Barr, Tonya Harding & Sasha Farber, Kelly and Ryan's Anniversary Celebration Week – A Year in Review	No
May 4	Kelly Ripa & Ryan Seacrest	Yes	Kelly and Ryan's Anniversary Celebration	No
May 7	Kelly Ripa & Ryan Seacrest	Yes	John Goodman, Adam Lambert, AJR	No
May 8	Kelly Ripa & Ryan Seacrest	Yes	Maura Tierney, Bryshere Gray, Sugarland	No
May 9	Kelly Ripa & Ryan Seacrest	Yes	Chadwick Boseman, Josh Norman & Sharna Burgess, Barenaked Ladies	No
May 10	Kelly Ripa & Ryan Seacrest	Yes	Mayim Bialik, Ben Falcone	Yes
May 11	Kelly Ripa & Ryan Seacrest	Yes	Kim Kardashian West & Kris Jenner, Mommy and Me Yoga	No
May 14	Kelly Ripa & Ryan Seacrest	Yes	Anthony Anderson, Mary Steenburgen, Charlie Puth	No
May 15	Kelly Ripa & Ryan Seacrest	Yes	Jamie Foxx, Stephen Amell, Mark Bittman	No
May 16	Kelly Ripa & Ryan Seacrest	Yes	Candice Bergen Nikki Bella & Brie Bella, A Great Big World	No
May 17	Kelly Ripa & Ryan Seacrest	Yes	Scott Foley, Retta, Peter Gros	No
May 18	Kelly Ripa & Ryan Seacrest	Yes	Saoirse Ronan, Rachel Bloom, Luke Robitaille	Yes
May 21	Kelly Ripa & Mark Consuelos	Yes	Octavia Spencer, Natalie Dormer, Bishop Briggs	No
May 22	Kelly Ripa & Ryan Seacrest	Yes	Patricia Heaton, Maddie Poppe, Adam Rippon & Jenna Johnson	No
May 23	Kelly Ripa & Ryan Seacrest	Yes	Emilia Clarke, Sarah Rose Summers, Caleb Lee Hutchinson	Yes
May 24	Kelly Ripa & Ryan Seacrest	Yes	Ethan Hawke, Simon Baker, Tanya Harding & Sasha Farber, Josh Norman & Sharna Burgess	Yes
May 25	Kelly Ripa & Ryan Seacrest	Yes	Alec Baldwin, Jose Juarez, Road Trip Survival Guide	No
May 28	Kelly Ripa & Ryan Seacrest	Yes	Andy Cohen, Dylan Minnette, Allergies Quiz, Phillip Phillips	No
May 29	Kelly Ripa & Ryan Seacrest	Yes	Jim Parsons, Becca Kufrin, Cade Foehner	No
May 30	Kelly Ripa & Ryan Seacrest	Yes	Zachary Quinto, Kyle MacLachlan, First Aid Kit for Summer	No
May 31	Kelly Ripa & Ryan Seacrest	Yes	Anderson Cooper, Tituss Burgess, Chris Byrne	No

=== June 2018 ===
Date	Co-hosts	"Host chat"	Guests / segments	"Kelly and Ryan's Inbox"
June 1	Kelly Ripa & Ryan Seacrest	Yes	Jesse Tyler Ferguson, Billy Porter, Live's Fired-Up Friday: Fan Foodie Face-Off	No
June 4	Kelly Ripa & Ryan Seacrest	Yes	Julianna Margulies, Scripps National Spelling Bee Winner	No
June 5	Kelly Ripa & Ryan Seacrest	Yes	Cate Blanchett, Debi Mazar	No
June 6	Kelly Ripa & Ryan Seacrest	Yes	Alicia Silverstone, American Authors	No
June 7	Kelly Ripa & Ryan Seacrest	Yes	Ricky Martin, Regina King	No
June 8	Kelly Ripa & Ryan Seacrest	Yes	President Bill Clinton & James Patterson, Live's Fired-Up Friday: Fan Foodie Face-Off	No
June 11	Kelly Ripa & Ryan Seacrest	Yes	Mike Smith, Holly Hunter, Leslie Bibb, Melissa Benoist	No
June 12	Kelly Ripa & Ryan Seacrest	Yes	Jeremy Renner, Sophia Bush, Father's Day Gifts	No
June 13	Kelly Ripa & Ryan Seacrest	Yes	Claire Danes, Kelly Preston, Calum Scott	No
June 14	Kelly Ripa & Ryan Seacrest	Yes	Chris Pratt, Lisa Edelstein, Jason Mraz	No
June 15	Kelly Ripa & Ryan Seacrest	Yes	John Travolta, Bryce Dallas Howard, Live's Fired-Up Friday: Fan Foodie Face-Off	No
June 18	Kelly Ripa & Ryan Seacrest	Yes	James Corden, Science Bob	No
June 25	Kelly Ripa & Ryan Seacrest	Yes	Mike Myers, Betty Gilpin, Spicy Food Challenge	No

=== July 2018 ===
Date	Co-hosts	"Host chat"	Guests / segments	"Kelly and Ryan's Inbox"
July 2	Kelly Ripa & Ryan Seacrest	Yes	Omari Hardwick, Rachel Bilson, Battle of the Web Stars – Joey Graceffa vs. Rosanna Pansino	No
July 3	Kelly Ripa & Ryan Seacrest	Yes	Idina Menzel, The Vamps, Battle of the Web Stars – Vanessa Merrell vs. Veronica Merrell	No
July 4	Kelly Ripa & Ryan Seacrest	Yes	LIVE's Fourth of July Party: DJ Chantel Jeffries, La La Anthony, Battle of the Web Stars – Coyote Peterson vs. Dr. Evan Antin, LIVE's July 4 Games	No
July 5	Kelly Ripa & Ryan Seacrest	Yes	Curtis "50 Cent" Jackson, Caroline Rhea, Battle of the Web Stars – Kandee Johnson vs. Laura Lee	No
July 6	Kelly Ripa & Ryan Seacrest	Yes	Eddie Cibrian, Charlie Puth, Battle of the Web Stars – Yolanda Gampp vs. Laurie Shannon, Live's Fired-Up Friday: Fan Foodie Face-Off	No
July 9	Kelly Ripa & Ryan Seacrest	Yes	Armie Hammer, Colleen Ballinger, Keep It Cool Week – Cryotherapy	No
July 10	Kelly Ripa & Ryan Seacrest	Yes	Dwayne Johnson, Jess Glynne, Keep It Cool Week – Cool Hacks	No
July 11	Kelly Ripa & Ryan Seacrest	Yes	Will Arnett, Keep It Cool Week – Richard Blais	No
July 9	Kelly Ripa & Ryan Seacrest	Yes	James Van Der Beek, Neve Campbell, Keep It Cool Week – BRNNN workout	No
July 13	Kelly Ripa & Ryan Seacrest	Yes	Liv Tyler, Bernadette Peters, Keep It Cool Week – Dogs, LIVE's Fired-Up Friday: Fan Foodie Face-Off	No
July 16	Kelly Ripa & Ryan Seacrest	Yes	Rupert Friend, Liza Koshy, Mentalist Week – Oz Pearlman	No
July 17	Kelly Ripa & Ryan Seacrest	Yes	Niecy Nash, Kieran Culkin, Mentalist Week – Eric Dittelman	No
July 18	Kelly Ripa & Ryan Seacrest	Yes	Kristin Chenoweth, Beni Cwiakala, Mentalist Week – Josh Beckerman	No
July 19	Kelly Ripa & Ryan Seacrest	Yes	Constance Zimmer, Bea Miller, Mentalist Week – Matt Cooper	No
July 20	Kelly Ripa & Ryan Seacrest	Yes	Denzel Washington, Mentalist Week – Lior Suchard, LIVE's Fired-Up Friday: Fan Foodie Face-Off	No
July 23	Kelly Ripa & Ryan Seacrest	Yes	Angela Bassett, Jonathan Van Ness	No
July 24	Kelly Ripa & Ryan Seacrest	Yes	Henry Cavill, Katie Lowes, Kelly Goes to ComicCon	No
July 25	Kelly Ripa & Ryan Seacrest	Yes	Padma Lakshmi, Sutton Foster, Daughtry	No
July 26	Kelly Ripa & Ryan Seacrest	Yes	Jonathan Rhys Meyers, Lauren Cohan, Kids of LIVE Bathing Suit Fashion Show	Yes
July 27	Kelly Ripa & Ryan Seacrest	Yes	Glenn Close, John Cho, LIVE's Fired-Up Friday: Fan Foodie Face-Off	No
July 30	Ryan Seacrest & Jenna Dewan	Yes	Patricia Clarkson, Sam Heughan	Yes
July 31	Ryan Seacrest & Jenna Dewan	Yes	Bob Odenkirk, Uzo Aduba, Passenger	No

=== August 2018 ===
Date	Co-hosts	"Host chat"	Guests / segments	"Kelly and Ryan's Inbox"
August 1	Ryan Seacrest & Lisa Rinna	Yes	Mila Kunis, Ronda Rousey, Peter Gros	No
August 2	Ryan Seacrest & Lisa Rinna	Yes	Kate McKinnon, Jerry O'Connell	Yes
August 3	Ryan Seacrest & Katie Lowes	Yes	Taylor Schilling, Ashton Grace, LIVE's Fired-Up Friday: Fan Foodie Face-Off	No
August 6	Ryan Seacrest & Leslie Bibb	Yes	Alyssa Milano, Craig Bierko, Alice Merton, LIVE Goes Nuts Week – Ryan Makes Granola	No
August 7	Ryan Seacrest & Sophia Bush	Yes	Dana Delany, Becca Kufrin, LIVE Goes Nuts Week – Tips and Tricks	Yes
August 8	Ryan Seacrest & Maria Menounos	Yes	Nina Dobrev, Bill Pullman, Chris Young, LIVE Goes Nuts Week – Maria Makes Baklava	No
August 9	Ryan Seacrest & Maria Menounos	Yes	Kelsey Grammer, Ruby Rose, LIVE Goes Nuts Week – 411 on Nuts	No
August 10	Ryan Seacrest & Katie Lowes	Yes	Rainn Wilson, Ryan as a Ballperson, LIVE's Fired-Up Friday: Fan Foodie Face-Off, LIVE Goes Nuts Week – Shayna Taylor Makes Almond Milk	Yes
August 13	Kelly Ripa & Ryan Seacrest	Yes	Debra Messing, AJR, Peter Gros	No
August 14	Kelly Ripa & Ryan Seacrest	Yes	Ray Liotta, Evan Peters, Sting & Shaggy, Summer Health Risks and Snafus	No
August 15	Kelly Ripa & Ryan Seacrest	Yes	Rose Byrne, Chris Byrne, A Great Big World	No
August 16	Kelly Ripa & Ryan Seacrest	Yes	Jenni Farley, Sugarland, Jetiquette	Yes
August 17	Kelly Ripa & Ryan Seacrest	Yes	Peter Facinelli, Jason Mraz, Dermatology 101	No
August 20	Kelly Ripa & Ryan Seacrest	Yes	J. K. Simmons, Danielle Brooks, Life Hacks	No
August 27	Kelly Ripa & Ryan Seacrest	Yes	Joseph Fiennes, Daniel Cormier, Daphne Oz, Pentatonix, Barefoot Banana Battle	No

== Season 31 (2018–2019) ==
=== September 2018 ===
Date	Co-hosts	"Host chat"	Guests / segments	"Kelly and Ryan's Inbox"
September 3	Kelly Ripa & Ryan Seacrest	Yes	Howie Mandel, Derek Hough, Lance Ulanoff	No
September 4	Kelly Ripa & Ryan Seacrest	Yes	Maggie Gyllenhaal, Penn Badgley, LIVEtember – Facebook Pre-Show with LaurDIY	No
September 5	Kelly Ripa & Ryan Seacrest	Yes	Trevor Noah, Shay Mitchell, Troye Sivan, LIVEtember – Alisha Marie	No
September 6	Kelly Ripa & Ryan Seacrest	Yes	Rob Lowe, Why Don't We, LIVEtember – The Merrell Twins	No
September 7	Kelly Ripa & Ryan Seacrest	Yes	Jennifer Garner, David Muir, LIVEtember – Collins Key	Yes
September 10	Kelly Ripa & Ryan Seacrest	Yes	Novak Djokovic, Emma Thompson, Matt Czuchry, LIVEtember – Record Breaker Week	No
September 11	Kelly Ripa & Ryan Seacrest	Yes	Chris Harrison, Nia Franklin, Plain White T's, LIVEtember – Record Breaker Week	No
September 12	Kelly Ripa & Ryan Seacrest	Yes	Blake Lively, Hannahlei Cabanilla, LIVEtember – Record Breaker Week	Yes
September 13	Kelly Ripa & Ryan Seacrest	Yes	Henry Golding, Shannen Doherty, LIVEtember – Record Breaker Week	No
September 14	Kelly Ripa & Ryan Seacrest	Yes	Matthew McConaughey, LIVEtember – Record Breaker Week	No
September 17	Kelly Ripa & Andy Cohen	Yes	Michael Weatherly, Sanaa Lathan, Emergency Apps	No
September 18	Kelly Ripa & Ryan Seacrest	Yes	Queen Latifah, Jeremy Sisto, Tony Bennett & Diana Krall	No
September 19	Kelly Ripa & Ryan Seacrest	Yes	Chrissy Teigen, Taran Killam	Yes
September 20	Kelly Ripa & Ryan Seacrest	Yes	Jake Shears, Iain Armitage, Terrence Howard,	No
September 21	Kelly Ripa & Tiffany Haddish	Yes	Jack Black, Josh Groban, Jennifer Nettles	No
September 24	Kelly Ripa & Ryan Seacrest	Yes	Freddie Highmore, Colin Amazing, LIVEtember – Amazing Kids Week	No
September 25	Kelly Ripa & Ryan Seacrest	Yes	Ricky Gervais, LIVEtember – Amazing Kids Week	No
September 26	Kelly Ripa & Ryan Seacrest	Yes	Katy Mixon, Joe Morton, LIVEtember – Amazing Kids Week	Yes
September 27	Kelly Ripa & Ryan Seacrest	Yes	Kevin Hart, Faith Ford, LIVEtember – Amazing Kids Week	No
September 28	Kelly Ripa & Ryan Seacrest	Yes	Randall Park, Brynn Elliott, LIVEtember – Amazing Kids Week	No

=== October 2018 ===
Date	Co-hosts	"Host chat"	Guests / segments	"Kelly and Ryan's Inbox"
October 1	Kelly Ripa & Ryan Seacrest	Yes	Cuba Gooding Jr., Jensen Ackles, Dylan Scott	No
October 2	Kelly Ripa & Ryan Seacrest	Yes	Claire Foy, Jonathan & Drew Scott, Kelly's Birthday Surprise	No
October 3	Kelly Ripa & Ryan Seacrest	Yes	David Boreanaz, Halloween Decoration Ideas	Yes
October 4	Kelly Ripa & Ryan Seacrest	Yes	Michelle Williams, Common, How to Avoid Phone Scams	Yes
October 5	Kelly Ripa & Ryan Seacrest	Yes	Tom Selleck, Chelsea Clinton, Dr. Greg Yapalater	No
October 8	Kelly Ripa & Ryan Seacrest	Yes	Christina Aguilera, William Baldwin, Troye Sivan	No
October 9	Kelly Ripa & Ryan Seacrest	Yes	Anthony Anderson, Tom Payne, KT Tunstall	No
October 10	Kelly Ripa & Ryan Seacrest	Yes	Amanda Peet, Taye Diggs, Mike Posner	No
October 11	Kelly Ripa & Ryan Seacrest	Yes	Jennifer Hudson, Elsie Fisher, Creepy Crawly Cuisine	No
October 12	Kelly Ripa & Ryan Seacrest	Yes	Jeff Bridges, Rachel Bloom, Alice Merton	No
October 15	Kelly Ripa & Ryan Seacrest	Yes	Jimmy Kimmel, Ike Barinholtz, LIVE's Pump It Up Week	No
October 16	Kelly Ripa & Ryan Seacrest	Yes	Nathan Fillion, lovelytheband, LIVE's Pump It Up Week	No
October 17	Kelly Ripa & Ryan Seacrest	Yes	John Goodman, Amandla Stenberg, LIVE's Pump It Up Week	No
October 18	Kelly Ripa & Ryan Seacrest	Yes	John Stamos, Carson Kressley, Goo Goo Dolls, LIVE's Pump It Up Week	No
October 19	Kelly Ripa & Ryan Seacrest	Yes	Shaquille O'Neal, Kiernan Shipka, LIVE's Pump It Up Week	No
October 22	Kelly Ripa & Ryan Seacrest	Yes	Jada Pinkett Smith, Misty Copeland, DIY Halloween Crafts	No
October 23	Kelly Ripa & Ryan Seacrest	Yes	Scott Bakula, Juliette Lewis, Rosanna Pansino	Yes
October 24	Kelly Ripa & Ryan Seacrest	Yes	Greg Kinnear, Tracey Ullman, Elle King	No
October 25	Kelly Ripa & Ryan Seacrest	Yes	Gerard Butler, Kim Cattrall, Andrea & Mateo Bocelli	Yes
October 26	Kelly Ripa & Ryan Seacrest	Yes	Robin Wright, Sara Gilbert, Maddie Poppe, Extreme Pumpkin Carving	No
October 29	Kelly Ripa & Ryan Seacrest	Yes	Kerry Washington, Omari Hardwick, Dean Lewis	No
October 30	Kelly Ripa & Ryan Seacrest	Yes	Katy Perry, Luke Bryan & Lionel Richie, Tyler Perry	No
October 31	Kelly Ripa & Ryan Seacrest	Yes	LIVE's Best Halloween Show Ever: the ReBOOOOt	No

=== November 2018 ===
Date	Co-hosts	"Host chat"	Guests / segments	"Kelly and Ryan's Inbox"
November 1	Kelly Ripa & Ryan Seacrest	Yes	Diane Lane, Sam Heughan, Lukas Graham	No
November 2	Kelly Ripa & Ryan Seacrest	Yes	Sarah Jessica Parker, Rosamund Pike, Tips for Running	No
November 5	Kelly Ripa & Ryan Seacrest	Yes	Mary Keitany, Jude Law, Christopher Jackson, It's a Ruff Week	No
November 6	Kelly Ripa & Ryan Seacrest	Yes	Chrissy Metz, Kandi Burruss, Kane Brown, It's a Ruff Week	No
November 7	Kelly Ripa & Ryan Seacrest	Yes	Michael Consuelos, Coyote Peterson, It's a Ruff Week	No
November 8	Ryan Seacrest & Katie Lowes	Yes	Mark Wahlberg, LeAnn Rimes, It's a Ruff Week	No
November 9	Kelly Ripa & Ryan Seacrest	Yes	Benedict Cumberbatch, Josh Dallas, Sabrina Carpenter, It's a Ruff Week	No
November 12	Kelly Ripa & Ryan Seacrest	Yes	Michael B. Jordan, Kurt Russell, LIVE's Thanksgiving Feast Week – Joaquin Consuelos	No
November 13	Kelly Ripa & Ryan Seacrest	Yes	Jamie Foxx, LIVE's Thanksgiving Feast Week – Connie Seacrest	No
November 14	Kelly Ripa & Ryan Seacrest	Yes	Jussie Smollett, Big Apple Circus' Duo Fusion, LIVE's Thanksgiving Feast Week – Misha Gelman	No
November 15	Kelly Ripa & Ryan Seacrest	Yes	Michael Douglas, Brian Tyree Henry, LIVE's Thanksgiving Feast Week – Joe Ripa	No
November 16	Kelly Ripa & Ryan Seacrest	Yes	Alexander Skarsgard, Ryan Eggold, LIVE's Thanksgiving Feast Week – Meredith Seacrest	No
November 19	Kelly Ripa & Ryan Seacrest	Yes	Sarah Silverman, Taron Egerton, Ryan Goes on a Pizza Tour	No
November 20	Kelly Ripa & Ryan Seacrest	Yes	Michael Bublé, Patti LaBelle, Kelly Tours Central Park	No
November 21	Kelly Ripa & Ryan Seacrest	Yes	Mariah Carey, Emily Ratajkowski, Joey Logano	Yes
November 26	Kelly Ripa & Ryan Seacrest	Yes	Willem Dafoe, LIVE's Holiday Gift Guide – Meaghan Murphy	Yes
November 27	Kelly Ripa & Ryan Seacrest	Yes	Catherine Zeta-Jones, Ariel Winter, LIVE's Holiday Gift Guide – Liz Plosser	No
November 28	Kelly Ripa & Ryan Seacrest	Yes	Eric McCormack, Joan Allen, LIVE's Holiday Gift Guide – Dana Avidan Cohn	Yes
November 29	Kelly Ripa & Ryan Seacrest	Yes	Tyra Banks, Nick Kroll, LIVE's Holiday Gift Guide – Chris Byrne	Yes
November 30	Kelly Ripa & Ryan Seacrest	Yes	Garth Brooks, LIVE's Holiday Gift Guide – Lance Ulanoff	No

=== December 2018 ===
Date	Co-hosts	"Host chat"	Guests / segments	"Kelly and Ryan's Inbox"
December 3	Kelly Ripa & Ryan Seacrest	Yes	Jason Momoa, Joe Alwyn, Emily Mortimer, Just Kidding Around Week	No
December 4	Kelly Ripa & Ryan Seacrest	Yes	Colin Jost, Emma Bunton, Just Kidding Around Week	No
December 5	Kelly Ripa & Ryan Seacrest	Yes	J. K. Simmons, Amber Heard, A Great Big World, Just Kidding Around Week	No
December 6	Kelly Ripa & Ryan Seacrest	Yes	Kate Bosworth, Eden Grinshpan, Just Kidding Around Week	Yes
December 7	Kelly Ripa & Ryan Seacrest	Yes	Shania Twain, Patrick Wilson, Just Kidding Around Week	No
December 10	Kelly Ripa & Ryan Seacrest	Yes	Tony Goldwyn, Nick Cannon, LIVE's Holiday Hits Week – Maddie Poppe	Yes
December 11	Kelly Ripa & Ryan Seacrest	Yes	Milo Ventimiglia, Martina McBride, LIVE's Holiday Hits Week – JoJo Siwa	Yes
December 12	Kelly Ripa & Ryan Seacrest	Yes	Jennifer Lopez, Harlem Globetrotters, LIVE's Holiday Hits Week – Lindsey Stirling	No
December 13	Kelly Ripa & Ryan Seacrest	Yes	Leslie Mann, Regina King, LIVE's Holiday Hits Week – Ingrid Michaelson & Grace VanderWaal	Yes
December 14	Kelly Ripa & Ryan Seacrest	Yes	Kathryn Hahn, Lucas Hedges, LIVE's Holiday Hits Week – Michael Bublé	No
December 17	Kelly Ripa & Rita Ora	Yes	David Muir, Brit Morin, LIVE's Merry Money Games, LIVE's Countdown to Christmas	No
December 18	Kelly Ripa & Jeffrey Dean Morgan	Yes	Lin-Manuel Miranda, Saoirse Ronan, LIVE's Merry Money Games, LIVE's Countdown to Christmas	No
December 19	Kelly Ripa & Jeffrey Dean Morgan	Yes	Sandra Bullock, LIVE's Merry Money Games, LIVE's Countdown to Christmas	No
December 20	Kelly Ripa & Andy Cohen	Yes	Hailee Steinfeld, LIVE's Merry Money Games, LIVE's Countdown to Christmas	No
December 21	Kelly Ripa & Ryan Seacrest	Yes	LIVE's Holiday Sweater Party: Vanessa Hudgens, The Crafty Lumberjacks, LIVE's Merry Money Games, Audience Sweater Contest	No
December 24	Kelly Ripa & Ryan Seacrest	Yes	Kelly and Ryan's Christmas Eve: Seth MacFarlane, Martina McBride, Young People's Chorus of NYC, Santa, Honoring Everyday Heroes	No
December 27	Kelly Ripa & Ryan Seacrest	Yes	Jared Padalecki, Vicki Lawrence, Plain White T's, Whoopie Cushion Guinness World Record Attempt	No
December 31	Kelly Ripa & Ryan Seacrest	Yes	LIVE's Viewer's Choice Show 2018	No

=== January 2019 ===
Date	Co-hosts	"Host chat"	Guests / segments	"Kelly and Ryan's Inbox"
January 7	Kelly Ripa & Ryan Seacrest	Yes	Josh Hutcherson, Catriona, LIVE's Jan-YOU-ary – Bloating Food Swaps	No
January 8	Kelly Ripa & Ryan Seacrest	Yes	Allison Williams, Mark-Paul Gosselaar, LIVE's Jan-YOU-ary – Veggie Food Swaps	No
January 9	Kelly Ripa & Ryan Seacrest	Yes	Gwyneth Paltrow, Cobie Smulders, LIVE's Jan-YOU-ary – Heart Healthy Food Swaps	No
January 10	Kelly Ripa & Ryan Seacrest	Yes	Bryan Cranston, John David Washington, Jan-YOU-ary – Energy Boosting Food Swaps	No
January 11	Kelly Ripa & Ryan Seacrest	Yes	Keegan-Michael Key, Colton Underwood, Jan-YOU-ary – Healthy Greek Food Swaps	No
January 14	Kelly Ripa & Ryan Seacrest	Yes	James McAvoy, The Bella Twins, LIVE's Jan-YOU-ary – Bands Interval Workout	No
January 15	Kelly Ripa & Ryan Seacrest	Yes	Samuel L. Jackson, Noomi Rapace, LIVE's Jan-YOU-ary – Buff Yoga	Yes
January 16	Kelly Ripa & Ryan Seacrest	Yes	Howie Mandel, Molly Ringwald, LIVE's Jan-YOU-ary – Partner Workout	No
January 17	Kelly Ripa & Ryan Seacrest	Yes	Sarah Paulson, Regina Hall, LIVE's Jan-YOU-ary – Stress-Releasing Workout	No
January 18	Kelly Ripa & Ryan Seacrest	Yes	William H. Macy, LIVE's Jan-YOU-ary – No Excuses Home Workout, Elle King	No
January 21	Kelly Ripa & Ryan Seacrest	Yes	Viggo Mortensen, Jordan Fisher, Kane Brown	No
January 22	Kelly Ripa & Ryan Seacrest	Yes	Chris Pine, Madchen Amick, LIVE's Jan-YOU-ary – Baby and Toddler Basics	No
January 23	Kelly Ripa & Ryan Seacrest	Yes	Connie Britton, Shinedown, LIVE's Jan-YOU-ary – What to Feed Your Toddler	Yes
January 24	Kelly Ripa & Ryan Seacrest	Yes	Matt LeBlanc, Ilana Glazer, LIVE's Jan-YOU-ary – Your Baby and Germs	No
January 25	Ryan Seacrest & Katie Lowes	Yes	NeNe Leakes, Lecy Goranson, LIVE's Jan-YOU-ary – DIY Baby Safety	Yes
January 28	Kelly Ripa & Ryan Seacrest	Yes	Backstreet Boys, Victoria Beckham, LIVE's Jan-YOU-ary – Plant-Based Diet	No
January 29	Kelly Ripa & Ryan Seacrest	Yes	Matthew Broderick, Padma Lakshmi, LIVE's Jan-YOU-ary – The Dubrow Diet	No
January 30	Kelly Ripa & Ryan Seacrest	Yes	Abbi Jacobson, Mike Posner, Ben McKenzie, LIVE's Jan-YOU-ary – Benefits of Juicing	No
January 31	Kelly Ripa & Ryan Seacrest	Yes	Max Greenfield, Megan Mullally, LIVE's Jan-YOU-ary – Benefits of Stretching	Yes

=== February 2019 ===
Date	Co-hosts	"Host chat"	Guests / segments	"Kelly and Ryan's Inbox"
February 1	Kelly Ripa & Ryan Seacrest	Yes	Daniel Radcliffe, Keith Carradine, Super Bowl Pigs	No
February 4	Kelly Ripa & Ryan Seacrest	Yes	Taraji P. Henson, Rory Culkin, LIVE's FeBREWary – Coffee Quiz	No
February 5	Kelly Ripa & Ryan Seacrest	Yes	Liam Neeson, Kyle Richards, LIVE's FeBREWary – Coffee 101	Yes
February 6	Kelly Ripa & Ryan Seacrest	Yes	Chris Pratt, LIVE's FeBREWary – Unusual Uses for Coffee	Yes
February 7	Kelly Ripa & Ryan Seacrest	Yes	Donnie Wahlberg, Kate Walsh, LIVE's FeBREWary – Tea 101	No
February 8	Kelly Ripa & Ryan Seacrest	Yes	Liam Hemsworth, LIVE's FeBREWary – Brewing Beer at Home	No
February 11	Kelly Ripa & Ryan Seacrest	Yes	Missy Peregrym, Trevor Noah, LIVE's FeBREWary – Beer 101	No
February 12	Kelly Ripa & Ryan Seacrest	Yes	Craig Ferguson, Natasha Lyonne	Yes
February 13	Kelly Ripa & Ryan Seacrest	Yes	Kelsey Grammer, Lana Condor	Yes
February 14	Kelly Ripa & Ryan Seacrest	Yes	Jimmy Fallon, Lori Loughlin	No
February 15	Kelly Ripa & Ryan Seacrest	Yes	Morris Chestnut, Hottest Tech Gadgets, Trisha Yearwood	No
February 18	Kelly Ripa & Ryan Seacrest	Yes	Chandra Wilson, Lena Headey, Avril Lavigne, LIVE's Oscar Countdown Games	No
February 19	Kelly Ripa & Ryan Seacrest	Yes	America Ferrera, Denny Hamlin, Lukas Graham, LIVE's Oscar Countdown Games	Yes
February 20	Kelly Ripa & Ryan Seacrest	Yes	Anna Paquin, Hottest Toys 2019, LIVE's Oscar Countdown Games	Yes
February 21	Kelly Ripa & Ryan Seacrest	Yes	Alex Trebek, Lisa Rinna, LIVE's Oscar Countdown Games	No
February 22	Kelly Ripa & Ryan Seacrest	Yes	LIVE's Pre-Oscar Celebration: Rita Moreno, Carson Kressley, Oscar Memories and Flashbacks, LIVE's Oscar Countdown Games	No
February 25	Kelly Ripa & Ryan Seacrest	Yes	LIVE's After Oscar Show: Rami Malek, Bebe Rexha, Louise Roe & Jess Cagle	No
February 26	Kelly Ripa & Ryan Seacrest	Yes	Scott Foley, Derek Hough	Yes
February 27	Kelly Ripa & Ryan Seacrest	Yes	Tyler Perry, Christina Hendricks	Yes
February 28	Kelly Ripa & Ryan Seacrest	Yes	Annette Bening, Nina Dobrev, Flora Cash	Yes

=== March 2019 ===
Date	Co-hosts	"Host chat"	Guests / segments	"Kelly and Ryan's Inbox"
March 1	Kelly Ripa & Ryan Seacrest	Yes	Katy Perry, Luke Bryan & Lionel Richie, Kevin Nealon	No
March 4	Kelly Ripa & Ryan Seacrest	Yes	Kenan Thompson, Denise Richards	Yes
March 5	Kelly Ripa & Ryan Seacrest	Yes	Julianne Moore, Brandon Micheal Hall, Michael Ray	No
March 6	Kelly Ripa & Ryan Seacrest	Yes	Brie Larson, Barbara Eden	Yes
March 7	Kelly Ripa & Ryan Seacrest	Yes	Ricky Gervais, Dr. Mike Varshavski	Yes
March 8	Kelly Ripa & Ryan Seacrest	Yes	Charlie Hunnam, Jennifer Carpenter, New Kids on the Block	No
March 11	Kelly Ripa & Ryan Seacrest	Yes	Jon Cryer, Christian Siriano	Yes
March 12	Kelly Ripa & Ryan Seacrest	Yes	Christine Baranski, Maggie Siff	Yes
March 13	Kelly Ripa & Ryan Seacrest	Yes	Keira Knightley, Colton Underwood & Cassie Randolph	No
March 14	Kelly Ripa & Ryan Seacrest	Yes	Kate Beckinsale, Aidy Bryant	Yes
March 15	Kelly Ripa & Ryan Seacrest	Yes	Oscar Isaac, Winston Duke, Stephanie J. Block	No
March 18	Kelly Ripa & Ryan Seacrest	Yes	Christopher Meloni, Robin Givens, Spring Break Travel Tips	No
March 25	Ryan Seacrest & Lisa Rinna	Yes	Ruth Wilson, Corbin Bleu, Green Room Makeover Reveal	No
March 26	Ryan Seacrest & Lisa Rinna	Yes	Christie Brinkley, Tony Hale, Max Frost	Yes
March 27	Ryan Seacrest & Katie Lowes	Yes	Bridget Moynahan, Elizabeth McGovern, O.A.R.	Yes
March 28	Ryan Seacrest & Katie Lowes	Yes	Bear Grylls, Anna Chlumsky	Yes
March 29	Ryan Seacrest & Bebe Rexha	Yes	Kevin Costner, Bethenny Frankel	No

=== April 2019 ===
Date	Co-hosts	"Host chat"	Guests / segments	"Kelly and Ryan's Inbox"
April 1	Kelly Ripa & Mark Consuelos	Yes	Drew Barrymore, Sofia Carson	No
April 2	Kelly Ripa & Mark Consuelos	Yes	Tracy Morgan, Chris Sullivan, Chef Joseph Yoon	Yes
April 3	Kelly Ripa & Ryan Seacrest	Yes	Zachary Levi, Lauren Cohan, Abbie Cornish	No
April 4	Kelly Ripa & Mark Consuelos	Yes	Michelle Williams, Elle Fanning	Yes
April 5	Kelly Ripa & Mark Consuelos	Yes	Kelly Clarkson, Emilio Estevez, Jess Glynne	No
April 8	Kelly Ripa & Ryan Seacrest	Yes	Hugh Jackman, Chrissy Metz	No
April 9	Kelly Ripa & Ryan Seacrest	Yes	Kit Harington, Maria Menounos, Melissa Etheridge	No
April 10	Kelly Ripa & Ryan Seacrest	Yes	Hank Azaria, Justin Hartley	No
April 11	Kelly Ripa & Ryan Seacrest	Yes	Molly Shannon, Pauly D	No
April 12	Kelly Ripa & Ryan Seacrest	Yes	Kate Hudson, Gwendoline Christie, Dean Lewis	No
April 15	Kelly Ripa & Andy Cohen	Yes	Ed Helms, Ato Essandoh, LIVE's New York Auto Show Week – "Fun and Fast" Cars	Yes
April 16	Kelly Ripa & Ryan Seacrest	Yes	Mark Hamill, Lake Bell, LIVE's New York Auto Show Week – Sedans	No
April 17	Kelly Ripa & Ryan Seacrest	Yes	Taylor Schilling, Tracy Pollan, LIVE's New York Auto Show Week – Electric Cars	Yes
April 18	Kelly Ripa & Ryan Seacrest	Yes	Beth Behrs, James Brolin, SUVs and Crossovers	Yes
April 19	Kelly Ripa & Ryan Seacrest	Yes	David Muir, Asia Kate Dillon, LIVE's New York Auto Show Week – "Rugged Yet Refined" Cars	No
April 22	Kelly Ripa & Ryan Seacrest	Yes	Ralph Fiennes, Lorraine Toussaint, LIVE's Spring Has Sprung Week – Decluttering	No
April 23	Kelly Ripa & Ryan Seacrest	Yes	Uma Thurman, Pitbull, LIVE's Spring Has Sprung Week – Myron Mixon	No
April 24	Kelly Ripa & Ryan Seacrest	Yes	Tony Goldwyn, Ralph Macchio, LIVE's Spring Has Sprung Week – Spring Allergies	No
April 25	Kelly Ripa & Ryan Seacrest	Yes	Jeremy Renner, Michael Ealy, Peter Gros, LIVE's Spring Has Sprung Week	No
April 26	Kelly Ripa & Ryan Seacrest	Yes	Viola Davis, Sean Astin, LIVE's Spring Has Sprung Week	No
April 29	Kelly Ripa & Ryan Seacrest	Yes	Christina Applegate, Tiffani Thiessen, Kelly & Ryan's 2nd Anniversary Week	No
April 30	Kelly Ripa & Ryan Seacrest	Yes	Seth Rogen, Laura Carmichael, Kelly & Ryan's 2nd Anniversary Week	Yes

=== May 2019 ===
Date	Co-hosts	"Host chat"	Guests / segments	"Kelly and Ryan's Inbox"
May 1	Kelly Ripa & Ryan Seacrest	Yes	Kelly & Ryan's 2nd Anniversary Show: Charlize Theron, Linda Cardellini, David Garibaldi	No
May 2	Kelly Ripa & Ryan Seacrest	Yes	Diane Sawyer, Nicholas Hoult, Kelly & Ryan's 2nd Anniversary Week	Yes
May 3	Kelly Ripa & Ryan Seacrest	Yes	Ryan Reynolds, Retta, Kelly & Ryan's 2nd Anniversary Week	No
May 6	Kelly Ripa & Ryan Seacrest	Yes	Craig Ferguson, Cheslie Kryst, LIVE's Moms Know Best Week – Nutrition	Yes
May 7	Kelly Ripa & Ryan Seacrest	Yes	Will Smith, RuPaul, LIVE's Moms Know Best Week – Perfect Family Photo	Yes
May 8	Kelly Ripa & Ryan Seacrest	Yes	Amy Poehler, Anjelica Huston, LIVE's Moms Know Best Week – Kelly	Yes
May 9	Kelly Ripa & Ryan Seacrest	Yes	Keanu Reeves, Mena Massoud, LIVE's Moms Know Best Week – Laurie Gelman	No
May 10	Kelly Ripa & Ryan Seacrest	Yes	Naomi Scott, LIVE's Moms Know Best Week – Connie Seacrest	No
May 13	Kelly Ripa & Ryan Seacrest	Yes	Jimmy Kimmel, Bill Hader, LIVE's Broadway Week – Ali Stroker	Yes
May 14	Kelly Ripa & Ryan Seacrest	Yes	Jessica Alba, Shaggy, LIVE's Broadway Week – Backstage at King Kong	No
May 15	Kelly Ripa & Ryan Seacrest	Yes	Yara Shahidi, Margo Martindale, LIVE's Broadway Week – George Salazar	Yes
May 16	Kelly Ripa & Ryan Seacrest	Yes	Dennis Quaid, Hannah Brown, LIVE's Broadway Week – Backstage at Tootsie	No
May 17	Kelly Ripa & Ryan Seacrest	Yes	Gabrielle Union, Charles Melton, LIVE's Broadway Week – Hadestown	No
May 20	Kelly Ripa & Ryan Seacrest	Yes	Eric Stonestreet, Niecy Nash, Laine Hardy	Yes
May 21	Kelly Ripa & Ryan Seacrest	Yes	Julianna Margulies. Billie Lourd	Yes
May 22	Kelly Ripa & Ryan Seacrest	Yes	Kevin Hart, DJ Khaled, Chris Janson	Yes
May 23	Kelly Ripa & Mark Consuelos	Yes	Jamie Foxx, Richard Madden, Madison VanDenburg	Yes
May 24	Kelly Ripa & Mark Consuelos	Yes	Dana Carvey, Red Bull BC One Champions, Grillin'spiration Cook-Off	No
May 27	Kelly Ripa & Ryan Seacrest	Yes	Hilary Swank, Yvonne Strahovski, Lukas Graham	No
May 28	Kelly Ripa & Ryan Seacrest	Yes	Bryce Dallas Howard, Hot Summer Trends	Yes
May 29	Kelly Ripa & Ryan Seacrest	Yes	Tate Donovan, Jake Miller, Summer Dog Health Tips	No
May 30	Kelly Ripa & Ryan Seacrest	Yes	Jeff Daniels, Daniel Dae Kim, Hot Summer Toys	Yes
May 31	Kelly Ripa & Ryan Seacrest	Yes	Taron Egerton, Danielle Brooks, Grillin'spiration Cook-Off	No

=== June 2019 ===
Date	Co-hosts	"Host chat"	Guests / segments	"Kelly and Ryan's Inbox"
June 3	Kelly Ripa & Ryan Seacrest	Yes	Adam Scott, Behind-the-Scenes at Wango Tango, Lil' Champions Week – Scripps National Spelling Bee Winners	Yes
June 4	Kelly Ripa & Ryan Seacrest	Yes	Damian Lewis, Dan White, Lil' Champions Week – Kaitlyn Quinn	No
June 5	Kelly Ripa & Ryan Seacrest	Yes	Sienna Miller, Sanaa Lathan, Lil' Champions Week – Katelyn Abigania	No
June 6	Kelly Ripa & Ryan Seacrest	Yes	Vanessa Williams, MJ Rodriguez, Lil' Champions Week – Che Spiotta	Yes
June 7	Kelly Ripa & Ryan Seacrest	Yes	Kiefer Sutherland, Ellie Kemper, Grillin'spiration Cook-Off, Lil' Champions Week – Daniel Mai	Yes
June 10	Kelly Ripa & Ryan Seacrest	Yes	Carla Gugino, Billy Porter, NOTD feat. Georgia Ku	Yes
June 11	Kelly Ripa & Ryan Seacrest	Yes	Samuel L. Jackson, Juan Archuleta, Cup Stacking Twins	No
June 12	Kelly Ripa & Ryan Seacrest	Yes	Selena Gomez, Tessa Thompson, Apps for Dad	Yes
June 13	Ryan Seacrest & The Jonas Brothers	Yes	Chris Hemsworth, Bungee: Flow and Fly Workout	Yes
June 14	Ryan Seacrest & Robin Givens	Yes	Bill Pullman, Debi Mazar, Kate Gilman Williams, Grillin'spiration Cook-Off	No
June 17	Kelly Ripa & Mark Consuelos	Yes	Naomi Watts, John Leguizamo	Yes
June 18	Kelly Ripa & Mark Consuelos	Yes	Shania Twain, Cat Deeley	Yes
June 19	Kelly Ripa & Mark Consuelos	Yes	Keri Russell, Kim Raver, Chef Jorge Cruise	No
June 20	Kelly Ripa & Mark Consuelos	Yes	Cobie Smulders, Audra McDonald, Gary Woodland, Chef Tenney Flynn	No
June 21	Kelly Ripa & Mark Consuelos	Yes	Tracy Morgan, Drew Barrymore, Red Bull BC One Champions	No
June 24	Kelly Ripa & Ryan Seacrest	Yes	Anthony Anderson, Timbaland, Melissa Etheridge, Beat the Heat	No

=== July 2019 ===
Date	Co-hosts	"Host chat"	Guests / segments	"Kelly and Ryan's Inbox"
July 1	Kelly Ripa & Ryan Seacrest	Yes	Laura Linney, Alan Cumming, Myron Mixon, American Authors	No
July 4	Kelly Ripa & Ryan Seacrest	Yes	LIVE's Fourth of July Party: Finn Wolfhard, Noah Schnapp, Caleb McLaughlin & Gaten Matarazzo, O.A.R, Cornhole Competitors, LIVE's July 4 Games	No
July 8	Kelly Ripa & Ryan Seacrest	Yes	Kumail Nanjiani, Bernadette Peters	Yes
July 9	Kelly Ripa & Ryan Seacrest	Yes	Bethenny Frankel, Ingrid Michaelson, Healthy Summer Food Swaps	Yes
July 10	Kelly Ripa & Ryan Seacrest	Yes	Nicole "Snooki" Polizzi, James TW, Chef Mike Hauke	Yes
July 11	Kelly Ripa & Ryan Seacrest	Yes	David Muir, Science Bob	No
July 12	Kelly Ripa & Ryan Seacrest	Yes	David Bautista, Caroline Rhea, Grillin'spiration Cook-Off	No
July 15	Kelly Ripa & Ryan Seacrest	Yes	Joel McHale, Ryan Eggold, Gone West feat. Colbie Caillat	No
July 16	Kelly Ripa & Ryan Seacrest	Yes	Emily Deschanel, Ally Brooke, Gazillion Bubble Show	Yes
July 17	Kelly Ripa & Ryan Seacrest	Yes	Awkwafina, Joe Manganiello	Yes
July 18	Kelly Ripa & Ryan Seacrest	Yes	Diane Kruger, Billy Eichner	No
July 19	Kelly Ripa & Ryan Seacrest	Yes	Jake Gyllenhaal, Summer Survival Tips, Grillin'spiration Cook-Off	No
July 22	Kelly Ripa & Ryan Seacrest	Yes	Louie Anderson, Carson Kressley	Yes
July 23	Kelly Ripa & Ryan Seacrest	Yes	Laverne Cox, Isabela Moner	Yes
July 25	Kelly Ripa & Ryan Seacrest	Yes	Poppy Montgomery, Laura Prepon, MAX feat. Quinn XCII	Yes
July 26	Kelly Ripa & Ryan Seacrest	Yes	Uzo Aduba, Jamie Bell, Laurie Gelman, Grillin'spiration Cook-Off	No
July 29	Ryan Seacrest & Katie Lowes	Yes	Chace Crawford, Maya Hawke, Exotic Animals	Yes
July 30	Ryan Seacrest & Katie Lowes	Yes	Angela Bassett, Ekele Ukegbu	No
July 31	Ryan Seacrest & Maria Menounos	Yes	Ann Curry, Betty Gilpin, Maddie Poppe	Yes

=== August 2019 ===
Date	Co-hosts	"Host chat"	Guests / segments	"Kelly and Ryan's Inbox"
August 1	Ryan Seacrest & Maria Menounos	Yes	Dwayne Johnson, Cassidy Scheer, How to Grill Steak	No
August 2	Ryan Seacrest & Tamron Hall	Yes	Rosie Perez, Kelsey Van Waart, Tips for Summer Entertaining	No
August 5	Ryan Seacrest & Jenna Dewan	Yes	Shannen Doherty, Jacob Tremblay, Food Fluencers Week	Yes
August 6	Ryan Seacrest & Jenna Dewan	Yes	Julianne Moore, Marlon Wayans, Food Fluencers Week	No
August 7	Ryan Seacrest & Lisa Rinna	Yes	Milo Ventimiglia, Geena Davis, Food Fluencers Week	No
August 8	Ryan Seacrest & Vanessa Hudgens	Yes	Leslie Jones, Whitney Cummings, Food Fluencers Week	No
August 9	Kelly Ripa & Ryan Seacrest	Yes	Fred Savage, Eugenio Derbez, Food Fluencers Week	No
August 12	Kelly Ripa & Ryan Seacrest	Yes	Lucy Liu, Cary Elwes	No
August 19	Kelly Ripa & Ryan Seacrest	Yes	Jonathan Groff, Lela Loren, Chris Byrne	No
August 26	Kelly Ripa & Ryan Seacrest	Yes	Lucy Lawless, James Pickens Jr., Tips for Vacationing at Home	No

== Season 32 (2019–2020) ==
=== September 2019 ===
Date	Co-hosts	"Host chat"	Guests / segments	"Kelly and Ryan's Inbox"
September 2	Kelly Ripa & Ryan Seacrest	Yes	Curtis "50 Cent" Jackson, David Dobrik, LIVE's School of Life Week – Smartphone 101	No
September 3	Kelly Ripa & Ryan Seacrest	Yes	Maggie Gyllenhaal, LIVE's School of Life Week – Automotive 101	No
September 4	Kelly Ripa & Ryan Seacrest	Yes	Cara Delevingne, David Muir, LIVE's School of Life Week – Plumbing 101	No
September 5	Kelly Ripa & Ryan Seacrest	Yes	Constance Wu, Nicole Scherzinger, LIVE's School of Life Week – Photography 101	Yes
September 6	Kelly Ripa & Ryan Seacrest	Yes	Orlando Bloom, LIVE's School of Life Week – Cooking 101	No
September 9	Kelly Ripa & Ryan Seacrest	Yes	Bianca Andreescu, Ansel Elgort, Tamron Hall, LIVE's Record Breaker Week	No
September 10	Kelly Ripa & Ryan Seacrest	Yes	Ashton Kutcher, Bill Skarsgård, LIVE's Record Breaker Week	No
September 11	Kelly Ripa & Ryan Seacrest	Yes	Jennifer Lopez, Trisha Yearwood, LIVE's Record Breaker Week	No
September 12	Kelly Ripa & Ryan Seacrest	Yes	James McAvoy, Antoni Porowski, Goo Goo Dolls, LIVE's Record Breaker Week	No
September 13	Kelly Ripa & Ryan Seacrest	Yes	Kim Kardashian West, LIVE's Record Breaker Week	No
September 16	Kelly Ripa & Ryan Seacrest	Yes	Morris Chestnut, Taran Killam, LIVE's Bread Club Week	No
September 17	Kelly Ripa & Ryan Seacrest	Yes	Michelle Dockery, LIVE's Bread Club Week	Yes
September 18	Kelly Ripa & Ryan Seacrest	Yes	Sara Gilbert, Bailey Muñoz, LIVE's Bread Club Week	Yes
September 19	Ryan Seacrest	Yes	Taraji P. Henson, Iain Armitage, LIVE's Bread Club Week	Yes
September 20	Kelly Ripa & Ryan Seacrest	Yes	Sylvester Stallone, LIVE's Bread Club Week	No
September 23	Kelly Ripa & Ryan Seacrest	Yes	John Goodman, Bob Iger, Ryan at iHeart Radio Music Festival	Yes
September 24	Kelly Ripa & Ryan Seacrest	Yes	Forest Whitaker, Allison Tolman, New York 101 – Kelly's Bread Tour	No
September 25	Kelly Ripa & Ryan Seacrest	Yes	Cobie Smulders, Liza Koshy, New York 101 – Ryan's Pasta Tour	No
September 26	Kelly Ripa & Ryan Seacrest	Yes	Patricia Heaton, Carrie Ann Inaba, Why Don't We	No
September 27	Kelly Ripa & Ryan Seacrest	Yes	Alex Rodriguez, Brandon Micheal Hall, New York 101 – Steve Patterson	No
September 30	Kelly Ripa & Ryan Seacrest	Yes	Paris Hilton, Deborah Norville, Aaron Sanchez, LIVE's FAN-Tastic Family Face Off #1	Yes

=== October 2019 ===
Date	Co-hosts	"Host chat"	Guests / segments	"Kelly and Ryan's Inbox"
October 1	Kelly Ripa & Anderson Cooper	Yes	Rami Malek, Kristin Chenoweth, LIVE's FAN-Tastic Family Face Off #2	No
October 2	Kelly Ripa & Ryan Seacrest	Yes	Adam Lambert, Recipes with Apples, LIVE's FAN-Tastic Family Face Off #3	No
October 3	Kelly Ripa & Ryan Seacrest	Yes	Billy Bob Thornton, Andy Grammer, LIVE's FAN-Tastic Family Face Off #4	Yes
October 4	Ryan Seacrest & Lisa Rinna	Yes	Nick Kroll, Penelope Cruz, LIVE's FAN-Tastic Family Face Off #5	No
October 7	Kelly Ripa & Ryan Seacrest	Yes	Jenny McCarthy, Nina Dobrev	Yes
October 8	Kelly Ripa & Ryan Seacrest	Yes	Jimmy Fallon, Stephen Puth	No
October 9	Kelly Ripa & Josh Groban	Yes	Clive Owen, Conkarah feat. Shaggy	No
October 10	Kelly Ripa & Ryan Seacrest	Yes	Ted Danson, Elizabeth Olsen	No
October 11	Ryan Seacrest & Liza Koshy	Yes	Anne Hathaway, Alfre Woodard	No
October 14	Kelly Ripa & Ryan Seacrest	Yes	Edward Norton, Derren Brown, Live @ Home Week – Fall Decor	No
October 15	Kelly Ripa & Ryan Seacrest	Yes	Lupita Nyong'o, Alyssa Milano, Live @ Home Week – Green Cleaning	Yes
October 16	Kelly Ripa & Ryan Seacrest	Yes	Mariska Hargitay, Victoria Beckham, Live @ Home Week – Home Office Essentials	No
October 17	Kelly Ripa & Ryan Seacrest	Yes	Hailee Steinfeld, Debby Ryan, Natasha Bedingfield, Live @ Home Week – Fall Gardening	Yes
October 18	Kelly Ripa & Ryan Seacrest	Yes	Michelle Pfeiffer, Julie Andrews, Live @ Home Week – Home Bargains	No
October 21	Kelly Ripa & Ryan Seacrest	Yes	Jimmy Kimmel, Naomie Harris	No
October 22	Kelly Ripa & Ryan Seacrest	Yes	Kate Beckinsale, Anna Camp	Yes
October 23	Kelly Ripa & Ryan Seacrest	Yes	Aaron Paul, Camila Mendes	Yes
October 24	Kelly Ripa & Ryan Seacrest	Yes	Willem Dafoe, Cynthia Erivo, Lindsey Stirling	No
October 25	Kelly Ripa & Ryan Seacrest	Yes	Eddie Murphy, Holiday Travel Tips	No
October 28	Kelly Ripa & Ryan Seacrest	Yes	Queen Latifah, Randall Park, Halloween Decorations	No
October 29	Kelly Ripa & Ryan Seacrest	Yes	Henry Golding, Bear Grylls, Halloween Treats	No
October 30	Kelly Ripa & Ryan Seacrest	Yes	Emilia Clarke, Harry Connick Jr., Pump Up Your Pumpkins	No
October 31	Kelly Ripa & Ryan Seacrest	Yes	LIVE's Best Halloween Show Ever: Viral Edition, Kal Penn, Halloween Costume Contest	Yes

=== November 2019 ===
Date	Co-hosts	"Host chat"	Guests / segments	"Kelly and Ryan's Inbox"
November 1	Kelly Ripa & Ryan Seacrest	Yes	Emma Thompson, Ingrid Michaelson, Marathon Tips and Tricks	No
November 4	Kelly Ripa & Ryan Seacrest	Yes	Matt Czuchry, Renée Elise Goldsberry, Loud Luxury and Bryce Vine	No
November 5	Kelly Ripa & Ryan Seacrest	Yes	Tim McGraw, Bridget Moynahan	Yes
November 6	Kelly Ripa & Ryan Seacrest	Yes	Kristen Stewart, Vivica A. Fox, Public	Yes
November 7	Ryan Seacrest & Elizabeth Banks	Yes	John Cena, Holiday Drinks	Yes
November 8	Ryan Seacrest & Carrie Underwood	Yes	Maura Tierney, Brian Cox	No
November 11	Kelly Ripa & Ryan Seacrest	Yes	Helen Mirren, Kristen Davis	Yes
November 12	Kelly Ripa & Ryan Seacrest	Yes	Jeff Goldblum, Ben Platt	Yes
November 13	Kelly Ripa & Ryan Seacrest	Yes	Idina Menzel, Tony Hale	No
November 14	Kelly Ripa & Ryan Seacrest	Yes	Kevin McKidd, Sebastian Maniscalco	Yes
November 18	Kelly Ripa & Ryan Seacrest	Yes	LIVE! in Las Vegas: Chrissy Metz, Mat Franco, Kelly's Vegas Bachelorette Party	No
November 22	Kelly Ripa & Ryan Seacrest	Yes	LIVE! in Las Vegas: Howie Mandel, Cirque Du Soleil, Instagrammable Vegas	No
November 25	Kelly Ripa & Ryan Seacrest	Yes	Garth Brooks, Drew Carey, LIVE's Thanksgiving Cooking Week – Buddy Valastro	No
November 26	Kelly Ripa & Ryan Seacrest	Yes	Daisy Ridley, Hannah Brown & Alan Bersten, Kel Mitchell & Witney Carson, LIVE's Thanksgiving Cooking Week – Michael Symon	Yes
November 27	Kelly Ripa & Ryan Seacrest	Yes	John Boyega, Mark Cuban, LIVE's Thanksgiving Cooking Week – Alfred Portale	No

=== December 2019 ===
Date	Co-hosts	"Host chat"	Guests / segments	"Kelly and Ryan's Inbox"
December 2	Kelly Ripa & Ryan Seacrest	Yes	Scarlett Johansson, LIVE's Holiday Gift Guide	No
December 3	Kelly Ripa & Ryan Seacrest	Yes	Laura Linney, Aaron Taylor-Johnson, LIVE's Holiday Gift Guide	No
December 4	Kelly Ripa & Ryan Seacrest	Yes	Harry Hamlin, LIVE's Holiday Gift Guide	No
December 5	Kelly Ripa & Ryan Seacrest	Yes	Jimmy Smits, Lea Michele, LIVE's Holiday Gift Guide	No
December 6	Kelly Ripa & Ryan Seacrest	Yes	Laura Dern, Pentatonix, LIVE's Holiday Gift Guide	No
December 9	Kelly Ripa & Ryan Seacrest	Yes	Tony Goldwyn, Brandon Routh	Yes
December 10	Kelly Ripa & Ryan Seacrest	Yes	Saoirse Ronan, Zozibini Tunzi, LIVE's Holiday Entertaining Week – The Seacrests	No
December 11	Kelly Ripa & Ryan Seacrest	Yes	Wilmer Valderrama, AJ Mitchell, LIVE's Holiday Entertaining Week – The Consuelos'	Yes
December 12	Kelly Ripa & Ryan Seacrest	Yes	Jack Black, Monsta X, LIVE's Holiday Entertaining Week – Festive Table Decor	No
December 13	Kelly Ripa & Ryan Seacrest	Yes	Jon Hamm, Gone West ft. Colbie Caillat, LIVE's Holiday Entertaining Week – Holiday Hacks	No
December 16	Kelly Ripa & Mark Consuelos	Yes	Jennifer Hudson, Thomas Schumacher, Cooking with the Gelman Family	No
December 17	Kelly Ripa & Mark Consuelos	Yes	Brie Larson, Jason Derulo, Andrea Bocelli	No
December 18	Kelly Ripa & Andy Cohen	Yes	Michael B. Jordan, Paula Patton, Holiday Cupcakes	No
December 19	Kelly Ripa & Ryan Seacrest	Yes	Anna Kendrick, Kathleen Turner, Lewis Capaldi	No
December 20	Kelly Ripa & Ryan Seacrest	Yes	LIVE's Holiday Sweater Party: Julia Stiles, Scott Wolf, Audience Sweater Contest	No
December 23	Kelly Ripa & Ryan Seacrest	Yes	Kate Bosworth, Michael Sheen, Science Bob	No
December 24	Kelly Ripa & Ryan Seacrest	Yes	Kelly and Ryan's Christmas Eve: Ryan Reynolds, Lacey Chabert, Pentatonix, The Radio City Rockettes, Santa, Christmas Memories	No
December 26	Kelly Ripa & Ryan Seacrest	Yes	LIVE! in Las Vegas: Shania Twain, Vegas Food Tour, Le Rêve	No
December 27	Kelly Ripa & Ryan Seacrest	Yes	LIVE! in Las Vegas: Blue Man Group, Christina Aguilera, Carrot Top, LIVE's Vegas Adventure	No

=== January 2020 ===
Date	Co-hosts	"Host chat"	Guests / segments	"Kelly and Ryan's Inbox"
January 6	Kelly Ripa & Ryan Seacrest	Yes	Rose Byrne, James Holzhauer, LIVE's Jan-NEW-ary – Dry January	No
January 7	Kelly Ripa & Ryan Seacrest	Yes	Bobby Cannavale, Julian McMahon, LIVE's Jan-NEW-ary – How Not to Diet	Yes
January 8	Kelly Ripa & Ryan Seacrest	Yes	Penn Badgley, Jennifer Coolidge, LIVE's Jan-NEW-ary – Eat to Beat Disease	No
January 9	Kelly Ripa & Ryan Seacrest	Yes	Billy Porter, LIVE's Jan-NEW-ary – The Mediterranean Diet	Yes
January 10	Ryan Seacrest & Jonathan and Drew Scott	Yes	Martin Lawrence, Jason Biggs, LIVE's Jan-NEW-ary – Healthy Food Swaps	No
January 13	Kelly Ripa & Ryan Seacrest	Yes	Selena Gomez, Jay Hernandez, LIVE's Jan-NEW-ary – Foam Rolling 101	No
January 14	Kelly Ripa & Ryan Seacrest	Yes	Tyler Perry, Echosmith, LIVE's Jan-NEW-ary – Breathing 101	No
January 15	Kelly Ripa & Ryan Seacrest	Yes	Renee Zellweger, Finn Wolfhard, LIVE's Jan-NEW-ary – Skin Care Tips	No
January 16	Kelly Ripa & Ryan Seacrest	Yes	Jerry O'Connell, LIVE's Jan-NEW-ary – RESTolutions	Yes
January 17	Ryan Seacrest & Katie Lowes	Yes	Vanessa Hudgens, Omari Hardwick, LIVE's Jan-NEW-ary – Top Wellness Trends	Yes
January 20	Kelly Ripa & Ryan Seacrest	Yes	Daniel Radcliffe, David Alan Grier, New Hope Club, LIVE's Jan-NEW-ary – Wellness Bargains	No
January 21	Kelly Ripa & Ryan Seacrest	Yes	Tony Goldwyn, Brandon Routh, LIVE's Jan-NEW-ary – Meals for Kids	No
January 22	Kelly Ripa & Ryan Seacrest	Yes	Blair Underwood, LIVE's Jan-NEW-ary – Healthy Cooking	Yes
January 23	Kelly Ripa & Ryan Seacrest	Yes	Noah Centineo, Jason George, LIVE's Jan-NEW-ary – Get Off Your Acid	Yes
January 24	Kelly Ripa & Ryan Seacrest	Yes	LIVE's Viewer's Choice Show 2019	No
January 27	Kelly Ripa & Ryan Seacrest	Yes	Bill Pullman, Jordan Fisher, Stray Kids	No
January 28	Kelly Ripa & Ryan Seacrest	Yes	Matt Bomer, 2020 Oscars Preview	Yes
January 29	Kelly Ripa & Ryan Seacrest	Yes	Antonio Banderas, LIVE's Jan-NEW-ary – New Tech Gadgets	Yes
January 30	Kelly Ripa & Ryan Seacrest	Yes	Max Greenfield, LIVE's Jan-NEW-ary – Home Organization	Yes
January 31	Kelly Ripa & Ryan Seacrest	Yes	Blake Lively, Coyote Peterson, Little Big Town	Yes

=== February 2020 ===
Date	Co-hosts	"Host chat"	Guests / segments	"Kelly and Ryan's Inbox"
February 3	Kelly Ripa & Ryan Seacrest	Yes	Claire Danes, Derek Hough, LIVE's Oscar Countdown Games	No
February 4	Kelly Ripa & Ryan Seacrest	Yes	Edie Falco, Peter Weber, LIVE's Oscar Countdown Games	No
February 5	Kelly Ripa & Ryan Seacrest	Yes	Jeff Probst, Lana Condor, LIVE's Oscar Countdown Games	No
February 6	Kelly Ripa & Ryan Seacrest	Yes	James Cromwell, Olivia Rodrigo, LIVE's Oscar Countdown Games	No
February 7	Kelly Ripa & Ryan Seacrest	Yes	LIVE's Pre-Oscar Celebration: Dean-Charles Chapman, Chad Wood, Oscar Memories and Flashbacks, LIVE's Oscar Countdown Games	No
February 10	Kelly Ripa & Ryan Seacrest	Yes	LIVE's After Oscar Show: Matthew Cherry & Karen Toliver, Ke$ha, Jonathan Van Ness & Maria Menounos, Oscar Memories	No
February 11	Kelly Ripa & Ryan Seacrest	Yes	Constance Wu, Curtis "50 Cent" Jackson, LIVE's Love Week – LIVE's In-Love-Box	Yes
February 12	Kelly Ripa & Ryan Seacrest	Yes	Sam Heughan, Milo Manheim, LIVE's Love Week – Char Margolis	No
February 13	Kelly Ripa & Ryan Seacrest	Yes	James Marsden, Lucy Hale, LIVE's Love Week – Valentine's Day Crafts	Yes
February 14	Kelly Ripa & Ryan Seacrest	Yes	LIVE's Valentine's Day Special: Will Ferrell, Charlie Wilson, LIVE's Love Week – Jerry O'Connell	Yes
February 17	Kelly Ripa & Ryan Seacrest	Yes	RuPaul, Zoey Deutch, LIVE's Travel Week – Girls' Trip Tips	Yes
February 18	Kelly Ripa & Ryan Seacrest	Yes	Denny Hamlin, Anya Taylor-Joy, LIVE's Travel Week – Airport Tips	Yes
February 19	Kelly Ripa & Ryan Seacrest	Yes	Nathan Fillion, Cast of Impractical Jokers, Fitz and the Tantrums, LIVE's Travel Week – Avoiding Sickness While Traveling	Yes
February 20	Kelly Ripa & Ryan Seacrest	Yes	Bob Odenkirk, Darby Stanchfield, LIVE's Travel Week – Travel Hacks	No
February 21	Kelly Ripa & Ryan Seacrest	Yes	Caitriona Balfe, McKenzie Kurtz & Ciara Renée, LIVE's Travel Week – Travel Bargains	No
February 24	Kelly Ripa & Ryan Seacrest	Yes	Tyra Banks, Christopher Jackson, #instafoodie Winter Cooking Week – Feel Good Foodie	Yes
February 25	Kelly Ripa & Ryan Seacrest	Yes	Anthony Mackie, Joseph Benavidez, #instafoodie Winter Cooking Week – Geoffrey Zakarian	No
February 26	Kelly Ripa & Ryan Seacrest	Yes	Elisabeth Moss, #instafoodie Winter Cooking Week – Guy Fieri	Yes
February 27	Kelly Ripa & Ryan Seacrest	Yes	Kyle MacLachlan, Static & Ben El ft. Pitbull, #instafoodie Winter Cooking Week – Gaby Dalkin	Yes
February 28	Kelly Ripa & Ryan Seacrest	Yes	Juliette Lewis, Nik Wallenda, Chris Byrne, #instafoodie Winter Cooking Week – Andrea Rea	No

=== March 2020 ===
Date	Co-hosts	"Host chat"	Guests / segments	"Kelly and Ryan's Inbox"
March 2	Kelly Ripa & Ryan Seacrest	Yes	Winston Duke, Aaron Tveit, American Authors	Yes
March 3	Kelly Ripa & Ryan Seacrest	Yes	James Taylor, Sabrina Carpenter	Yes
March 4	Kelly Ripa & Ryan Seacrest	Yes	Tom Selleck, Elaine Welteroth	No
March 5	Kelly Ripa & Ryan Seacrest	Yes	NeNe Leakes, Richard Marx	No
March 6	Kelly Ripa & Ryan Seacrest	Yes	Whitney Cummings, Billy Gardell, Jaden Jefferson	No
March 9	Kelly Ripa & Ryan Seacrest	Yes	KJ Apa, Djimon Hounsou	Yes
March 10	Kelly Ripa & Ryan Seacrest	Yes	Nick Offerman, Katherine Schwarzenegger Pratt, Barry Sonnenfeld	No
March 11	Kelly Ripa & Ryan Seacrest	Yes	Kal Penn, Joan Lunden	Yes
March 12	Kelly Ripa & Ryan Seacrest	Yes	Angela Bassett, Charli D'Amelio, Fitz and the Tantrums	Yes
March 13	Kelly Ripa & Ryan Seacrest	Yes	Ariel Winter, Dave "Lil Dicky" Burd, New Hope Club	Yes
March 16	Kelly Ripa & Ryan Seacrest	Yes	John Krasinski, Jane Levy, The Goo Goo Dolls	No
March 23	Kelly Ripa & Ryan Seacrest	Yes	Mark Consuelos, Carson Kressley, Healthy Home Recipes	Yes
March 24	Kelly Ripa & Ryan Seacrest	Yes	Jerry O'Connell, Caroline Rhea, At Home Ballet Workout	Yes
March 25	Kelly Ripa & Ryan Seacrest	Yes	Josh Groban, Joshua Jackson, Dr. Jennifer Ashton	Yes
March 26	Kelly Ripa & Ryan Seacrest	Yes	Kevin Bacon, Sebastian Maniscalco, Science Bob	No
March 27	Kelly Ripa & Ryan Seacrest	Yes	Nicole Richie, Johnny Rzeznik, Health and Wellness Bargains	Yes
March 30	Kelly Ripa & Ryan Seacrest	Yes	Issa Rae, Leslie Odom Jr., Touching Up Your Roots at Home	Yes
March 31	Kelly Ripa & Ryan Seacrest	Yes	Josh Radnor, Colton Underwood, LIVE's Virtual Workout	Yes

=== April 2020 ===
Date	Co-hosts	"Host chat"	Guests / segments	"Kelly and Ryan's Inbox"
April 1	Kelly Ripa & Ryan Seacrest	Yes	Uzo Aduba, Bethenny Frankel, MAX, LIVE's Virtual Workout	Yes
April 2	Kelly Ripa & Ryan Seacrest	Yes	Michael Bublé, Kim Raver, LIVE's Virtual Workout	Yes
April 6	Kelly Ripa & Ryan Seacrest	Yes	Jon Cryer, Laura Prepon	Yes
April 7	Kelly Ripa & Ryan Seacrest	Yes	Tracy Morgan, Jewel, Dr. Jennifer Ashton	Yes
April 8	Kelly Ripa & Ryan Seacrest	Yes	Taraji P. Henson, Ty Burrell, Dr. Wendy Bazilian	Yes
April 9	Kelly Ripa & Ryan Seacrest	Yes	Max Greenfield, Victor Rasuk, David Foster, Self Gardening Tips	Yes
April 13	Kelly Ripa & Ryan Seacrest	Yes	Alessia Cara, Jeffrey Katzenberg, Laugh with LIVE Week – Ed Helms	No
April 14	Kelly Ripa & Ryan Seacrest	Yes	Dove Cameron, Denise Richards, Laugh with LIVE Week – Sebastian Maniscalco	Yes
April 15	Kelly Ripa & Ryan Seacrest	Yes	Kyle Richards, Laine Hardy, Laugh with LIVE Week – Whitney Cummings	Yes
April 16	Kelly Ripa & Ryan Seacrest	Yes	Cate Blanchett, Amy & Tyler Clites, Aloe Blacc, Laugh with LIVE Week – Wendi McLendon-Covey	Yes
April 20	Kelly Ripa & Mark Consuelos	Yes	Katy Mixon, Rob Gronkowski & Camille Kostek, Hand Washing Tips, LIVE Goes Green Week	No
April 21	Kelly Ripa & Mark Consuelos	Yes	Pitbull, Josh Hutcherson, Science Bob, LIVE Goes Green Week	Yes
April 22	Kelly Ripa & Ryan Seacrest	Yes	Jeffrey Dean Morgan, Natalie Dormer, LIVE Goes Green Week – Upcycling	Yes
April 23	Kelly Ripa & Ryan Seacrest	Yes	Ricky Gervais, Ali Wentworth, LIVE Goes Green Week – Green Bargains	No
April 24	Kelly Ripa & Ryan Seacrest	Yes	Mark Consuelos, Skylar Astin, Andy Grammer	Yes
April 27	Kelly Ripa & Ryan Seacrest	Yes	Jane Krakowski, Coping with COVID Week – Dr. Michael Breus	No
April 28	Kelly Ripa & Ryan Seacrest	Yes	David Boreanaz, Liza Koshy, Coping with COVID Week – Amy Nofziger	No
April 29	Kelly Ripa & Ryan Seacrest	Yes	Luke Bryan, Lionel Richie & Katy Perry, Coping with COVID Week – Dr. Belisa Vranich	No
April 30	Kelly Ripa & Ryan Seacrest	Yes	Jimmy Kimmel, Beth Behrs, Coping with COVID Week – Dr. Xavier Cruz	No

=== May 2020 ===
Date	Co-hosts	"Host chat"	Guests / segments	"Kelly and Ryan's Inbox"
May 4	Kelly Ripa & Ryan Seacrest	Yes	Anderson Cooper, Mandy Moore, LIVE's Cooking in Quarantine Week – Marie Haycox	No
May 5	Kelly Ripa & Ryan Seacrest	Yes	Christina Applegate, Jason Mraz, LIVE's Cooking in Quarantine Week – Sara Lynn Cauchon	No
May 6	Kelly Ripa & Ryan Seacrest	Yes	Dua Lipa, LIVE's Cooking in Quarantine Week – Feel Good Foodie	No
May 7	Kelly Ripa & Ryan Seacrest	Yes	Ashton Kutcher & Mila Kunis, Hilarie Burton Morgan, LIVE's Cooking in Quarantine Week – Tony Boloney	No
May 8	Kelly Ripa & Ryan Seacrest	Yes	Lin-Manuel Miranda, Marlo Thomas & Phil Donahue, LIVE's Cooking in Quarantine Week – Eric Ripert	Yes
May 11	Kelly Ripa & Ryan Seacrest	Yes	Daniel Radcliffe, LIVE's Conquering the Q Week – Homeschooling	No
May 12	Kelly Ripa & Ryan Seacrest	Yes	Michelle Dockery, LIVE's Conquering the Q Week – Video Conferencing	No
May 13	Kelly Ripa & Ryan Seacrest	Yes	James Marsden, LIVE's Conquering the Q Week – Quarantine Financial Advice	No
May 14	Kelly Ripa & Ryan Seacrest	Yes	Yara Shahidi, Daveed Diggs, LIVE's Conquering the Q Week – Minimizing COVID-19 Risk	No
May 15	Kelly Ripa & Ryan Seacrest	Yes	Glenn Close, Chase Stokes, LIVE's Conquering the Q Week – Navigating Re-Opening Fears	No
May 18	Kelly Ripa & Mark Consuelos	Yes	Laura Linney, Just Sam, LIVE's You in the Q Week – Self-Care Superfoods	No
May 19	Kelly Ripa & Ryan Seacrest	Yes	Debi Mazar, LIVE's You in the Q Week – Self-Care Skin Repair Tips	No
May 20	Kelly Ripa & Ryan Seacrest	Yes	Darren Criss, LIVE's You in the Q Week – DIY Relaxation & Meditation Crafts	No
May 21	Kelly Ripa & Ryan Seacrest	Yes	Debra Messing, Julia Gargano, LIVE's You in the Q Week – Self-Care Bargains	No
May 22	Kelly Ripa & Ryan Seacrest	Yes	Connie Britton, Steve Patterson, LIVE's You in the Q Week – Yoga in the Q!	No
May 25	Kelly Ripa & Mark Consuelos	Yes	David Spade, LeAnn Rimes, Myron Mixon	No
May 26	Kelly Ripa & Ryan Seacrest	Yes	Keegan-Michael Key, Madison Beer, LIVE's Summer Staycation Week – Vern Yip	No
May 27	Kelly Ripa & Ryan Seacrest	Yes	Josh Gad, Steve Patterson, LIVE's Summer Staycation Week – Backyard Summer Games	No
May 28	Kelly Ripa & Ryan Seacrest	Yes	Tracee Ellis Ross, LIVE's Summer Staycation Week – International Family Night	No
May 29	Kelly Ripa & Ryan Seacrest	Yes	LIVE's At-Home Prom: DJ Pauly D, Addison Rae, AJR, Prom Fashions at Home	No

=== June 2020 ===
Date	Co-hosts	"Host chat"	Guests / segments	"Kelly and Ryan's Inbox"
June 1	Kelly Ripa & Ryan Seacrest	Yes	Amanda Peet, LIVE's Summer Safety Week – Dr. Jennifer Ashton	No ′
June 2	Kelly Ripa & Ryan Seacrest	Yes	David Muir, LIVE's Summer Safety Week – Pet Safety	No
June 3	Kelly Ripa & Ryan Seacrest	Yes	Carson Kressley, LIVE's Summer Safety Week – Road Trip Safety	No
June 4	Kelly Ripa & Ryan Seacrest	Yes	Blair Underwood, LIVE's Summer Safety Week – Summer Recreation Safety	Yes
June 5	Kelly Ripa & Ryan Seacrest	Yes	Derek Luke, LIVE's Summer Safety Week – Safety While Grilling	No
June 8	Kelly Ripa & Ryan Seacrest	Yes	Josh Duhamel, Bugs of Summer	No
June 9	Kelly Ripa & Ryan Seacrest	Yes	Anderson Cooper, Curbing Financial Worries	No
June 10	Kelly Ripa & Ryan Seacrest	Yes	Judd Apatow, Medical Advice & First Aid Tips	Yes
June 11	Kelly Ripa & Ryan Seacrest	Yes	Steve Buscemi, Tips for Virtual Job Interview	Yes
June 12	Kelly Ripa & Ryan Seacrest	Yes	Andy Cohen, Jaden Jefferson, LIVE's Coast-to-Coast Hometown BBQ	No
June 15	Kelly Ripa & Ryan Seacrest	Yes	Kevin Costner, Sofia Carson, Flying After Quarantine	No
June 16	Kelly Ripa & Ryan Seacrest	Yes	Matt Bomer, Padma Lakshmi, DIY Father's Day Gifts	No
June 17	Kelly Ripa & Ryan Seacrest	Yes	Laverne Cox, Summer Skincare Bargains	Yes
June 18	Kelly Ripa & Ryan Seacrest	Yes	Bryce Dallas Howard, Rhett & Link	Yes
June 19	Kelly Ripa & Ryan Seacrest	Yes	Lonnie Chavis, Avril Lavigne, LIVE's Coast-to-Coast Hometown BBQ	No
June 22	Kelly Ripa & Ryan Seacrest	Yes	John Lithgow, Summer Parenting Tips	Yes
June 29	Kelly Ripa & Ryan Seacrest	Yes	Tamron Hall, Guilt-Free Summer Cookout	No

=== July 2020 ===
Date	Co-hosts	"Host chat"	Guests / segments	"Kelly and Ryan's Inbox"
July 3	Kelly Ripa & Ryan Seacrest	Yes	LIVE's Coast-to-Coast Fourth of July Show: Renée Elise Goldsberry, Hula Hoop Competition, LIVE's Coast-to-Coast Hometown BBQ	No
July 6	Kelly Ripa & Ryan Seacrest	Yes	Rob Lowe, LIVE's I in I Do Week – Meet the Bride and Groom	No
July 7	Kelly Ripa & Ryan Seacrest	Yes	Mandy Moore, LIVE's I in I Do Week – Wedding Cake Tasting	No
July 8	Kelly Ripa & Ryan Seacrest	Yes	Adam Scott, LIVE's I in I Do Week – Dancing Lessons	No
July 9	Kelly Ripa & Ryan Seacrest	Yes	Regina Hall, Gabby Barrett, LIVE's I in I Do Week – Behind-the-Scenes Wedding Prep	Yes
July 10	Kelly Ripa & Ryan Seacrest	Yes	LIVE's "I" in "I Do": Jerry O'Connell & Rebecca Romijn, Messages from Wedding Guests, Joe	No
July 13	Kelly Ripa & Ryan Seacrest	Yes	Luke Bryan, Plant-Based Eating Tips	No
July 14	Kelly Ripa & Ryan Seacrest	Yes	Christopher Jackson, Bernadette Peters	No
July 15	Kelly Ripa & Ryan Seacrest	Yes	Dakota Fanning, Dr. Jennifer Ashton	No
July 16	Kelly Ripa & Ryan Seacrest	Yes	Camila Mendes, Road Trip Bargains	No
July 17	Kelly Ripa & Ryan Seacrest	Yes	Maria Shriver & Patrick Schwarzenegger, LIVE's Coast-to-Coast Hometown BBQ	No
July 20	Kelly Ripa & Ryan Seacrest	Yes	Andy Cohen, LIVE's Virtual Living Week – Virtual Schooling Spaces	No
July 21	Kelly Ripa & Ryan Seacrest	Yes	Tony Hale, LIVE's Virtual Living Week – Virtual Schooling Apps	Yes
July 22	Kelly Ripa & Ryan Seacrest	Yes	Jane Curtin, LIVE's Virtual Living Week – Virtual Workout Tips	No
July 23	Kelly Ripa & Ryan Seacrest	Yes	Nia Long, Natasha Bedingfield, LIVE's Virtual Living Week – Virtual Movie Night	No
July 24	Kelly Ripa & Ryan Seacrest	Yes	Lisa Rinna, LIVE's Coast-to-Coast Hometown BBQ	No
July 27	Kelly Ripa & Ryan Seacrest	Yes	Remembering Regis, Kiefer Sutherland, Camp Live! – Michael Symon	No
July 28	Kelly Ripa & Mark Consuelos	Yes	Christopher Meloni, Camp Live! – Nature Crafts	No
July 29	Kelly Ripa & Ryan Seacrest	Yes	Katie Holmes, Ron Howard, Camp Live! – Water Safety Tips	No
July 30	Kelly Ripa & Mark Consuelos	Yes	Eva LaRue, Bob Behnken & Doug Hurley, Camp Live! – Wild Animal Encounter Tips	No

=== August 2020 ===
Date	Co-hosts	"Host chat"	Guests / segments	"Kelly and Ryan's Inbox"
August 3	Ryan Seacrest & Katie Lowes	Yes	Jai Courtney, LIVE's Coast-to-Coast Hometown BBQ	No
August 4	Ryan Seacrest & Katie Lowes	Yes	Jordan Fisher, Tips for Kids with Masks	No
August 5	Ryan Seacrest & Maria Menounos	Yes	Derek Hough, Bargains Under $20	Yes
August 6	Ryan Seacrest & Maria Menounos	Yes	Howie Mandel, Dr. Jennifer Ashton	Yes
August 7	Ryan Seacrest & Elaine Welteroth	Yes	Common, LIVE's Coast-to-Coast Hometown BBQ	No
August 10	Ryan Seacrest & Liza Koshy	Yes	Julie Chen Moonves, Shaggy, Cool Healthy Treats for Hot Days	No
August 11	Ryan Seacrest & Sisanie	Yes	Bryan Cranston, Staying Sane While Working from Home	No
August 12	Ryan Seacrest & Sisanie	Yes	Joe Manganiello, DIY Outdoor Activities	Yes
August 13	Kelly Ripa & Ryan Seacrest	Yes	Jake Johnson, Summer Cheese Plates	No
August 17	Kelly Ripa & Ryan Seacrest	Yes	Bear Grylls, Science Bob	Yes
August 24	Kelly Ripa & Ryan Seacrest	Yes	Joseph Gordon-Levitt, Boosting Your Immunity	No
August 31	Kelly Ripa & Ryan Seacrest	Yes	Kristin Chenoweth, Labor Day Cookout Hacks	No

== Season 33 (2020–2021) ==
=== September 2020 ===
Date	Co-hosts	"Host chat"	Guests / segments	"Kelly and Ryan's Inbox"
September 7	Kelly Ripa & Ryan Seacrest	Yes	LIVE's Labor Day Cookout: Hilary Swank, Brett Eldredge, Favorite Holiday Recipes	No
September 8	Kelly Ripa & Ryan Seacrest	Yes	John Leguizamo, LIVE's @Home Improvement Week – Creating an Outdoor Oasis	No
September 9	Kelly Ripa & Ryan Seacrest	Yes	Jessica Alba, David Muir, LIVE's @Home Improvement Week – Decluttering	No
September 10	Kelly Ripa & Ryan Seacrest	Yes	Tyra Banks, LIVE's @Home Improvement Week – Paint Like a Professional	Yes
September 11	Kelly Ripa & Ryan Seacrest	Yes	Drew Scott, LIVE's @Home Improvement Week – DIY Home Repairs	No
September 14	Kelly Ripa & Ryan Seacrest	Yes	Dominic Thiem, Lauren Cohan, LIVE's @Home Cooking School Week – Cooking Seafood	No
September 15	Kelly Ripa & Ryan Seacrest	Yes	Jimmy Kimmel, LIVE's @Home Cooking School Week – Basic Kitchen Knife Skills	No
September 16	Kelly Ripa & Ryan Seacrest	Yes	Josh Groban, LIVE's @Home Cooking School Week – Searing, Sautéing & Frying	No
September 17	Kelly Ripa	Yes	Bethenny Frankel, LIVE's @Home Cooking School Week – Meat 101	No
September 18	Kelly Ripa	Yes	Sarah Paulson, Caroline Rhea, LIVE's @Home Cooking School Week – Cooking with Herbs and Spices	No
September 21	Kelly Ripa & Ryan Seacrest	Yes	Ali Wentworth, Kim Cattrall, LIVE's @Home Money $avings Week – Save at the Supermarket	No
September 22	Kelly Ripa & Ryan Seacrest	Yes	Ken Jeong, LIVE's @Home Money $avings Week – Revamping Your Budget	Yes
September 23	Kelly Ripa & Ryan Seacrest	Yes	Chace Crawford, Sunny Hostin, LIVE's @Home Money $avings Week – Paying Off Debt	No
September 24	Kelly Ripa & Ryan Seacrest	Yes	Jeff Daniels, Carole Baskin, LIVE's @Home Money $avings Week – Saving for Emergencies	No
September 25	Kelly Ripa & Ryan Seacrest	Yes	Julianne Moore, Shaquille O'Neal, LIVE's @Home Money $avings Week – Sleep Easy at Home	Yes
September 28	Kelly Ripa & Ryan Seacrest	Yes	Rainn Wilson, Sara Bareilles, LIVE's @Home House Calls Week – First Aid Kit Essentials	No
September 29	Kelly Ripa & Ryan Seacrest	Yes	Matt Bomer, LIVE's @Home House Calls Week – First Aid for Your Skin	Yes
September 30	Kelly Ripa & Ryan Seacrest	Yes	Tim McGraw, LIVE's @Home House Calls Week – Common COVID-19 Questions	No

=== October 2020 ===
Date	Co-hosts	"Host chat"	Guests / segments	"Kelly and Ryan's Inbox"
October 1	Kelly Ripa & Ryan Seacrest	Yes	Lily Collins, Tim McGraw, LIVE's @Home House Calls Week – Relieving Quarantine Blues	No
October 2	Kelly Ripa & Ryan Seacrest	Yes	Anderson Cooper, Kathie Lee Gifford, Kelly's Birthday Celebration	No
October 5	Kelly Ripa & Ryan Seacrest	Yes	Shania Twain, Autumn Apple Recipes	Yes
October 6	Kelly Ripa & Ryan Seacrest	Yes	Kal Penn, DIY Fall Decor Tips	No
October 7	Kelly Ripa & Ryan Seacrest	Yes	Noah Schnapp, Guinness World Record Breaking Attempt, LIVE's Healthcare Hero Winner	Yes
October 8	Kelly Ripa & Ryan Seacrest	Yes	Uma Thurman, JP Saxe, Guinness World Record Breaking Attempt	Yes
October 9	Kelly Ripa & Ryan Seacrest	Yes	Robert De Niro, Theresa Caputo, Guinness World Record Breaking Attempt	Yes
October 12	Kelly Ripa & Ryan Seacrest	Yes	Joel McHale, LIVE's Virtual Science Week – Making a Volcano	No
October 13	Kelly Ripa & Ryan Seacrest	Yes	Andrew Cuomo, Clare Crawley, LIVE's Virtual Science Week – Making a Hovercraft	No
October 14	Kelly Ripa & Ryan Seacrest	Yes	Carrie Ann Inaba, LIVE's Virtual Science Week – Fun with Dry Ice	No
October 15	Kelly Ripa & Ryan Seacrest	Yes	Leslie Jones, Dr. Greg Yapalater, LIVE's Virtual Science Week – Halloween Inventions	Yes
October 16	Kelly Ripa & Ryan Seacrest	Yes	Vivica A. Fox, Elizabeth Marvel, Clean & Green Bargains, LIVE's Virtual Science Week – Scientist Party	No
October 19	Kelly Ripa	Yes	Sara Gilbert, Pumpkin Recipes	No
October 20	Kelly Ripa	Yes	Matthew McConaughey, Fun Fall Crafts	No
October 21	Kelly Ripa & Ryan Seacrest	Yes	Eddie Redmayne, Halloween Safety Tips	Yes
October 22	Kelly Ripa & Ryan Seacrest	Yes	Laverne Cox, Juan Archuleta	No
October 23	Kelly Ripa & Ryan Seacrest	Yes	Anthony Anderson, Gloria Steinem, Skincare Routines	No
October 26	Kelly Ripa & Ryan Seacrest	Yes	Anne Hathaway, LIVE's Countdown to Halloween Week – At Home Halloween Party	Yes
October 27	Kelly Ripa & Ryan Seacrest	Yes	Jimmy Fallon, Jessica Capshaw, LIVE's Countdown to Halloween Week – Pump Up Your Pumpkin	No
October 28	Kelly Ripa & Ryan Seacrest	Yes	Lorraine Bracco, LIVE's Countdown to Halloween Week – Halloween Look Back	Yes
October 29	Kelly Ripa & Ryan Seacrest	Yes	Sam Heughan, LIVE's Countdown to Halloween Week – DIY Halloween Costumes	Yes
October 30	Kelly Ripa & Ryan Seacrest	Yes	LIVE's Best Halloween Show Ever: Almost as Scary as Real Life	No

=== November 2020 ===
Date	Co-hosts	"Host chat"	Guests / segments	"Kelly and Ryan's Inbox"
November 2	Kelly Ripa & Ryan Seacrest	Yes	Freddie Highmore, Keeping the Peace with Family	No
November 3	Kelly Ripa & Ryan Seacrest	Yes	Chrissy Metz, Sleep and Election Stress Tips	No
November 4	Kelly Ripa & Ryan Seacrest	Yes	Chris O'Donnell, Darius Rucker, Election Aftermath Tips	No
November 5	Kelly Ripa & Ryan Seacrest	Yes	Kelly's 30th Disney Anniversary: All My Children Reunion, Hope & Faith Reunion, 30th Anniversary Surprise	No
November 6	Kelly Ripa & Ryan Seacrest	Yes	Diane Lane, Holiday Travel Tips	Yes
November 9	Kelly Ripa & Ryan Seacrest	Yes	Gillian Anderson, Tayshia Adams	No
November 10	Kelly Ripa & Ryan Seacrest	Yes	Kate Mara, Jonathan Scott, Winterizing Your Home	Yes
November 11	Kelly Ripa & Ryan Seacrest	Yes	Vince Vaughn	Yes
November 12	Kelly Ripa & Ryan Seacrest	Yes	Chandra Wilson, Ryan and Friends Do Lunch	Yes
November 13	Kelly Ripa & Ryan Seacrest	Yes	Lenny Kravitz, Jenny "JWoww" Farley, Self-Care & Fashion Bargains	No
November 16	Kelly Ripa & Ryan Seacrest	Yes	Curtis "50 Cent" Jackson, Thanksgiving 2020 – Tips for Safe Thanksgiving	No
November 17	Kelly Ripa & Ryan Seacrest	Yes	Ryan Phillippe, Thanksgiving 2020 – Saving Holiday Baking Fails	No
November 18	Kelly Ripa & Ryan Seacrest	Yes	Forest Whitaker, Thanksgiving 2020 – Hosting a Virtual Thanksgiving	No
November 19	Kelly Ripa & Ryan Seacrest	Yes	Tamron Hall, Susan Kelechi Watson, Thanksgiving 2020 – Making Cornucopias	No
November 20	Kelly Ripa & Ryan Seacrest	Yes	Chris Sullivan, Bridget Moynahan, Thanksgiving 2020 – Katie Brown	No
November 23	Kelly Ripa & Ryan Seacrest	Yes	Josh Groban, LIVE's Thanksgiving Family Cooking Week – Ryan	Yes
November 24	Kelly Ripa & Ryan Seacrest	Yes	Hugh Grant, Kaitlyn Bristowe & Artem Chigvintsev, Nev Schulman & Jenna Johnson, LIVE's Thanksgiving Family Cooking Week – Kelly	No
November 25	Kelly Ripa & Ryan Seacrest	Yes	Amy Adams, LIVE's Thanksgiving Family Cooking Week – Gelman	Yes
November 30	Kelly Ripa & Ryan Seacrest	Yes	Derek Hough, Rosie Perez, LIVE's Holiday Gift Guide 2020 – Budget-Friendly Tech Gifts	No

=== December 2020 ===
Date	Co-hosts	"Host chat"	Guests / segments	"Kelly and Ryan's Inbox"
December 1	Kelly Ripa & Ryan Seacrest	Yes	Jamie Dornan, LIVE's Holiday Gift Guide 2020 – Gifts that Give Back	Yes
December 2	Kelly Ripa & Ryan Seacrest	Yes	Riz Ahmed, LIVE's Holiday Gift Guide 2020 – DIY Personalized Gift Baskets	Yes
December 3	Ryan Seacrest & Tamron Hall	Yes	Heather Graham, LIVE's Holiday Gift Guide 2020 – Stocking Stuffers	Yes
December 4	Kelly Ripa & Ryan Seacrest	Yes	Aaron Eckhart, John Rzeznik, LIVE's Holiday Gift Guide 2020 – Chris Byrne	No
December 7	Kelly Ripa & Ryan Seacrest	Yes	Chris Pine, Christine Baranski, LIVE's Celebrate and $ave Week – Elevating Your Gift Wrap	Yes
December 8	Kelly Ripa & Ryan Seacrest	Yes	Sofia Carson, LIVE's Celebrate and $ave Week – DIY Holiday Cards	Yes
December 9	Kelly Ripa & Ryan Seacrest	Yes	Vanessa Hudgens, Shaggy, LIVE's Celebrate and $ave Week – DIY Holiday Ornaments	Yes
December 10	Kelly Ripa & Ryan Seacrest	Yes	James Marsden, LIVE's Celebrate and $ave Week – Luxury for Less Bargains	Yes
December 11	Kelly Ripa & Ryan Seacrest	Yes	Kerry Washington, LIVE's Celebrate and $ave Week – Upcycle Holiday Décor	Yes
December 14	Kelly Ripa & Andy Cohen	Yes	Mark Consuelos, LIVE's Family Cooking Week – David Mullen	No
December 15	Kelly Ripa & Andy Cohen	Yes	Gal Gadot, Tips for Zooming with Your Parents, LIVE's Family Cooking Week – Andrea Lizcano	No
December 16	Kelly Ripa & Anderson Cooper	Yes	Peyton Manning, LIVE's Family Cooking Week – Mia Rossi	No
December 17	Kelly Ripa & Anderson Cooper	Yes	Tessa Thompson, LIVE's Family Cooking Week – Angie Riley	No
December 18	Kelly Ripa & Ryan Seacrest	Yes	LIVE's Holiday Sweater Party: Goldie Hawn & Kurt Russell, Virtual Audience Sweater Pageant, LIVE's Family Cooking Week – Christine Connolly	No
December 21	Kelly Ripa & Ryan Seacrest	Yes	Ali Wentworth, KJ Apa, Michael Symon	No
December 22	Kelly Ripa & Ryan Seacrest	Yes	LIVE's @ Home for the Holidays Special: Mariah Carey, Alanis Morissette, Holiday Home Videos	No
December 28	Ryan Seacrest & Ali Wentworth	Yes	Billy Porter, The Bella Twins	No

=== January 2021 ===
Date	Co-hosts	"Host chat"	Guests / segments	"Kelly and Ryan's Inbox"
January 4	Kelly Ripa & Ryan Seacrest	Yes	Matt James, Lisa Edelstein, LIVE's JanuREADY – Superfoods	No
January 5	Kelly Ripa & Ryan Seacrest	Yes	Ralph Macchio, Ken Jennings, LIVE's JanuREADY – Regulating Blood Sugar	Yes
January 6	Kelly Ripa & Ryan Seacrest	Yes	Tim Allen, LIVE's JanuREADY – Plant-Based Diets	Yes
January 7	Kelly Ripa & Ryan Seacrest	Yes	Jaime Pressly, Vanna White, LIVE's JanuREADY – Anti-Inflammatory Diet	No
January 8	Kelly Ripa & Ryan Seacrest	Yes	Holly Hunter, Carson Kressley, Banners, LIVE's JanuREADY – The Hydration Challenge	No
January 11	Kelly Ripa & Ryan Seacrest	Yes	Carey Mulligan, Tom Payne, LIVE's JanuREADY – HIIT Workout	No
January 12	Kelly Ripa & Ryan Seacrest	Yes	Anne Hathaway, Dr. Jennifer Ashton, LIVE's JanuREADY – Kickboxing Boot Camp	No
January 13	Kelly Ripa & Ryan Seacrest	Yes	Kyra Sedgwick, LIVE's JanuREADY – Fusion Yoga Workout	No
January 14	Kelly Ripa & Ryan Seacrest	Yes	Jennifer Lopez, Katy Mixon, LIVE's JanuREADY – ATHLEAN-X Workout	No
January 15	Kelly Ripa & Ryan Seacrest	Yes	Angela Bassett, LIVE's JanuREADY – Torch'd Workout	No
January 18	Kelly Ripa & Ryan Seacrest	Yes	Max Greenfield, Ice-T, New Year Tech Resolutions	No
January 19	Kelly Ripa & Ryan Seacrest	Yes	Leslie Odom Jr., Viewer's Choice Show Preview	Yes
January 21	Kelly Ripa & Ryan Seacrest	Yes	Priyanka Chopra, Jared Padalecki, Wellness Bargains	No
January 22	Kelly Ripa & Ryan Seacrest	Yes	LIVE's Viewer's Choice Show 2020	No
January 25	Kelly Ripa & Ryan Seacrest	Yes	Nathan Fillion, LIVE's JanuREADY – Automate Your Finances	No
January 26	Kelly Ripa & Ryan Seacrest	Yes	Tika Sumpter, LIVE's JanuREADY – Money Mind Games	No
January 27	Kelly Ripa & Ryan Seacrest	Yes	Rosario Dawson, LIVE's JanuREADY – How to Raise Money-Conscious Kids	No
January 28	Kelly Ripa & Ryan Seacrest	Yes	Jared Leto, LIVE's JanuREADY – Total Credit Makeover	No
January 29	Kelly Ripa & Ryan Seacrest	Yes	Naomi Watts, Cicely Tyson, LIVE's JanuREADY – Ready to Save Week	No

=== February 2021 ===
Date	Co-hosts	"Host chat"	Guests / segments	"Kelly and Ryan's Inbox"
February 1	Kelly Ripa & Ryan Seacrest	Yes	Katherine Heigl, LIVE's Winter Wellness Week – Staying Mentally Healthy	Yes
February 2	Kelly Ripa & Ryan Seacrest	Yes	David Duchovny, LIVE's Winter Wellness Week – Winter Skin Savers	Yes
February 3	Kelly Ripa & Ryan Seacrest	Yes	Ricky Gervais, LIVE's Winter Wellness Week – Food to Boost Your Mood	Yes
February 4	Kelly Ripa & Ryan Seacrest	Yes	Zendaya, Theresa Caputo, LIVE's Winter Wellness Week – The Power of Rituals	No
February 5	Kelly Ripa & Ryan Seacrest	Yes	Robin Wright, LIVE's Winter Wellness Week – Sleep	No
February 8	Kelly Ripa & Ryan Seacrest	Yes	Katy Perry, Luke Bryan & Lionel Richie; LIVE's Valentine's Week	Yes
February 9	Kelly Ripa & Ryan Seacrest	Yes	Kal Penn, Dr. Jennifer Ashton, LIVE's Valentine's Week	Yes
February 10	Kelly Ripa	Yes	Jason Biggs, LIVE's Valentine's Week	Yes
February 11	Kelly Ripa & Ryan Seacrest	Yes	Lana Condor, LIVE's Valentine's Week – Valentine's Day at Home	Yes
February 12	Kelly Ripa & Ryan Seacrest	Yes	LIVE's Valentine's Day Special: Kate Hudson, Mariah Carey, LIVE's Valentine's Week	Yes
February 15	Kelly Ripa & Ryan Seacrest	Yes	Awkwafina, JP Saxe	Yes
February 16	Kelly Ripa & Ryan Seacrest	Yes	Kevin James, Michael McDowell	Yes
February 17	Kelly Ripa & Ryan Seacrest	Yes	Lauren Cohan, Making Jambalaya	Yes
February 18	Kelly Ripa & Ryan Seacrest	Yes	Leslie Mann, Bargains on Everyday Solutions for Life	Yes
February 19	Kelly Ripa & Ryan Seacrest	Yes	Chloe Grace Moretz, Dr. Holly Phillips, Healthy & Delicious Smoothies	No
February 22	Kelly Ripa & Ryan Seacrest	Yes	LIVE's Virtual Road Trip – Miami, Florida: Jane Krakowski, Chesca, Chef Michelle Bernstein	No
February 23	Kelly Ripa & Ryan Seacrest	Yes	LIVE's Virtual Road Trip – Austin, Texas: Evan Ross, Shawn Colvin, Chef Aaron Franklin	Yes
February 24	Kelly Ripa & Ryan Seacrest	Yes	LIVE's Virtual Road Trip – Puerto Rico: Kelly Marie Tran, Reggaeton Dance Lesson	Yes
February 25	Kelly Ripa & Ryan Seacrest	Yes	LIVE's Virtual Road Trip – Phoenix, Arizona: Michael Chiklis, Chef Beau MacMillan	Yes
February 26	Kelly Ripa & Ryan Seacrest	Yes	LIVE's Virtual Road Trip – Palm Springs: Constance Zimmer, Chef Andrew Copley	Yes

=== March 2021 ===
Date	Co-hosts	"Host chat"	Guests / segments	"Kelly and Ryan's Inbox"
March 1	Kelly Ripa & Ryan Seacrest	Yes	Steven Yeun, LIVE's Cooking School: Gadget Edition – Air-Fryers	No
March 2	Kelly Ripa & Ryan Seacrest	Yes	Catherine Zeta-Jones, LIVE's Cooking School: Gadget Edition – Pressure Cookers	No
March 3	Kelly Ripa & Ryan Seacrest	Yes	Arsenio Hall, LIVE's Cooking School: Gadget Edition – Cast Iron Skillets	No
March 4	Kelly Ripa & Ryan Seacrest	Yes	Stanley Tucci, LIVE's Cooking School: Gadget Edition – Sous-Vide	No
March 5	Kelly Ripa & Ryan Seacrest	Yes	Eddie Murphy, LIVE's Cooking School: Gadget Edition – Cooking with Small Gadgets	No
March 8	Kelly Ripa & Ryan Seacrest	Yes	Delroy Lindo, Ciara Bravo, LIVE's Happy Pets Week – Separation Anxiety	No
March 9	Kelly Ripa & Ryan Seacrest	Yes	Jennifer Garner, LIVE's Happy Pets Week – Puppy Socialization	No
March 10	Kelly Ripa & Ryan Seacrest	Yes	Kim Raver, LIVE's Happy Pets Week – Kittens 101	No
March 11	Kelly Ripa & Ryan Seacrest	Yes	Emmanuel Acho, LIVE's Happy Pets Week – Pet Health & Safety at Home	No
March 12	Kelly Ripa & Ryan Seacrest	Yes	Kelsea Ballerini, LIVE's Happy Pets Week – Ask the Vet	No
March 15	Kelly Ripa & Ryan Seacrest	Yes	Joel McHale, Spring Gardening Crafts	No
March 16	Kelly Ripa & Ryan Seacrest	Yes	Mark Cuban, Tie Dye Crafting	Yes
March 17	Kelly Ripa & Ryan Seacrest	Yes	Anthony Mackie, St. Patrick's Day Crafts	No
March 18	Kelly Ripa & Ryan Seacrest	Yes	Jenny McCarthy, Bargains Under $20	Yes
March 19	Kelly Ripa & Ryan Seacrest	Yes	Cynthia Erivo, Easy Easter Crafts	No
March 22	Ryan Seacrest & Maria Menounos	Yes	Joe Manganiello, LIVE's Trending in the Kitchen – Baked Feta Pasta	No
March 23	Ryan Seacrest & Maria Menounos	Yes	Jessica Simpson, Bear Grylls, LIVE's Trending in the Kitchen – Tortilla Wrap Hack	No
March 24	Ryan Seacrest & Ali Wentworth	Yes	Lauren Graham, LIVE's Trending in the Kitchen – Whipped Coffee	Yes
March 25	Ryan Seacrest & Ali Wentworth	Yes	Holly Robinson Peete, LIVE's Trending in the Kitchen – Cloud Bread	Yes
March 26	Ryan Seacrest & Harry Connick Jr.	Yes	Chandra Wilson, Fill Your Life with Joy	Yes

=== April 2021 ===
Date	Co-hosts	"Host chat"	Guests / segments	"Kelly and Ryan's Inbox"
April 5	Kelly Ripa & Ryan Seacrest	Yes	Jeffrey Dean Morgan, Buddy Valastro	No
April 6	Kelly Ripa & Ryan Seacrest	Yes	Russell Brand, Homemade Wall Art	No
April 7	Kelly Ripa & Ryan Seacrest	Yes	Denis Leary, Dr. Jennifer Ashton	No
April 8	Kelly Ripa & Ryan Seacrest	Yes	Katey Sagal, National Empanada Day	Yes
April 9	Kelly Ripa & Ryan Seacrest	Yes	Topher Grace, National Fondue Day	No
April 12	Kelly Ripa & Ryan Seacrest	Yes	Dylan McDermott, LIVE's Spring Has Sprung Week – Spring Into Cleaning	No
April 13	Kelly Ripa & Ryan Seacrest	Yes	Vanessa Kirby, LIVE's Spring Has Sprung Week – Spring Back Into Travel	Yes
April 14	Kelly Ripa & Ryan Seacrest	Yes	John Corbett, LIVE's Spring Has Sprung Week – Spring into $avings	No
April 15	Kelly Ripa & Ryan Seacrest	Yes	John Stamos, LIVE's Spring Has Sprung Week – Spring Into Outdoor Fitness	Yes
April 16	Kelly Ripa & Ryan Seacrest	Yes	Morris Chestnut, LIVE's Spring Has Sprung Week – Spring Into Gardening	Yes
April 19	Kelly Ripa & Ryan Seacrest	Yes	Debi Mazar, LIVE's Countdown to the Oscars – Binging the Oscar Nominees	Yes
April 20	Kelly Ripa & Ryan Seacrest	Yes	Andra Day, LIVE's Countdown to the Oscars – Hosting a Virtual Screening Party	Yes
April 21	Kelly Ripa & Ryan Seacrest	Yes	Anderson Cooper, Dr. Vivek Murthy, LIVE's Countdown to the Oscars – Photos with the Stars	Yes
April 22	Kelly Ripa & Ryan Seacrest	Yes	Gal Gadot, Jonathan Tucker, Earth Day Bargains, LIVE's Countdown to the Oscars – After Oscar Show Memories	No
April 23	Kelly Ripa & Ryan Seacrest	Yes	LIVE's Pre-Oscar Celebration: Connie Britton, Know Your Oscars, Popcorn Hacks, Oscar Memories and Flashbacks, LIVE's Countdown to the Oscars – Taking Glam Photos	No
April 26	Kelly Ripa & Ryan Seacrest	Yes	LIVE's After Oscar Show: Daniel Kaluuya, Tyler Perry, Carson Kressley & Cheslie Kryst, Movie Memories	No
April 27	Kelly Ripa & Ryan Seacrest	Yes	Elisabeth Moss, Announcement of Top Teacher Search Semifinalists	Yes
April 28	Kelly Ripa & Ryan Seacrest	Yes	Bethenny Frankel, Next Level Salads	No
April 29	Kelly Ripa & Ryan Seacrest	Yes	Billy Porter, Spring Vegetable Recipes	No
April 30	Kelly Ripa & Ryan Seacrest	Yes	Mila Kunis, Callista Clark, Virtual Reality Tech	Yes

=== May 2021 ===
Date	Co-hosts	"Host chat"	Guests / segments	"Kelly and Ryan's Inbox"
May 3	Kelly Ripa & Ryan Seacrest	Yes	Julianna Margulies, LIVE's Top Teacher Week	No
May 4	Kelly Ripa & Ryan Seacrest	Yes	Patricia Heaton, Jon Batiste, LIVE's Top Teacher Week	No
May 5	Kelly Ripa & Ryan Seacrest	Yes	David Oyelowo, Cinco De Mayo Recipes, LIVE's Top Teacher Week	No
May 6	Kelly Ripa & Ryan Seacrest	Yes	Channing Tatum, Building a Mother's Day Bouquet, LIVE's Top Teacher Week	No
May 7	Kelly Ripa & Ryan Seacrest	Yes	Jennifer Hudson, Katheryn Winnick, LIVE's Top Teacher Week	Yes
May 10	Kelly Ripa & Ryan Seacrest	Yes	Andrew McCarthy, Curing Spring Ailments	No
May 11	Kelly Ripa & Ryan Seacrest	Yes	Josh Duhamel, Dr. Jennifer Ashton	No
May 12	Kelly Ripa & Ryan Seacrest	Yes	Hank Azaria, Summer Travel Tips	Yes
May 13	Kelly Ripa & Ryan Seacrest	Yes	Chris Rock, Jillian Michaels	Yes
May 14	Kelly Ripa & Ryan Seacrest	Yes	Denise Richards, Chef Kwame Onuachi	Yes
May 17	Kelly Ripa & Ryan Seacrest	Yes	Scott Foley, LIVE's Sleep Week – Getting Back to Sleep	Yes
May 18	Kelly Ripa & Ryan Seacrest	Yes	Derek Hough, Miss Universe, LIVE's Sleep Week – Getting a Sleep Divorce	Yes
May 19	Kelly Ripa & Ryan Seacrest	Yes	Wilmer Valderrama, LIVE's Sleep Week – Creating a Restful Sleep Environment	Yes
May 20	Kelly Ripa & Ryan Seacrest	Yes	Uzo Aduba, Spring Into Summer Bargains, LIVE's Sleep Week – Bedtime Foods for Better Sleep	No
May 21	Kelly Ripa & Ryan Seacrest	Yes	Jesse Williams, Bernadette Peters, LIVE's Sleep Week	No
May 24	Kelly Ripa & Ryan Seacrest	Yes	Omari Hardwick, Chayce Beckham	Yes
May 25	Kelly Ripa & Ryan Seacrest	Yes	Emma Stone, Cooking with Bugs	Yes
May 26	Kelly Ripa & Mark Consuelos	Yes	Michael Douglas, Dr. Mike Dow	Yes
May 27	Kelly Ripa & Ryan Seacrest	Yes	Shania Twain, Tony Hale, Willie Spence	No
May 28	Kelly Ripa & Mark Consuelos	Yes	Elizabeth Banks, Grace Kinstler, LIVE's Hometown Chefs Summer Cooking	No
May 31	Kelly Ripa & Ryan Seacrest	Yes	Lisa Rinna, Beach Workout	No

=== June 2021 ===
Date	Co-hosts	"Host chat"	Guests / segments	"Kelly and Ryan's Inbox"
June 1	Kelly Ripa & Ryan Seacrest	Yes	Kathleen Turner, Summer Skin Care	Yes
June 2	Ryan Seacrest & Ali Wentworth	Yes	Julianne Moore, Forest Blakk, Summer Outdoor Cleaning Hacks	Yes
June 3	Kelly Ripa & Ryan Seacrest	Yes	Patrick Wilson, Olivia Holt, Summer Food Swaps	No
June 4	Ryan Seacrest & Ali Wentworth	Yes	Jenna Elfman, Tom Jones, LIVE's Hometown Chefs Summer Cooking	No
June 7	Kelly Ripa & Ryan Seacrest	Yes	Jill Biden & Anthony Fauci, Anthony Ramos, Katie Thurston	No
June 8	Kelly Ripa & Ryan Seacrest	Yes	Bill Clinton & James Patterson, LIVE at Home Week – Home Hacks for Less	No
June 9	Kelly Ripa & Ryan Seacrest	Yes	Helen Hunt, LIVE at Home Week – Pandemic-Proof Home Improvement	Yes
June 10	Kelly Ripa & Ryan Seacrest	Yes	Jimmy Smits, Caroline Rhea, LIVE at Home Week – Affordable Outdoor Solutions	No
June 11	Kelly Ripa & Ryan Seacrest	Yes	Zooey Deschanel, Daphne Rubin-Vega, LIVE's Hometown Chefs Summer Cooking, LIVE at Home Week – Makeovers	No
June 14	Kelly Ripa & Ryan Seacrest	Yes	Tyrese Gibson, Avoiding Summer Travel Scams	Yes
June 15	Kelly Ripa & Ryan Seacrest	Yes	Salma Hayek, Annie Murphy, Chris Byrne	No
June 16	Kelly Ripa & Ryan Seacrest	Yes	Josh Gad, Wilson Cruz, Laundry Stain Removal Tips	No
June 17	Kelly Ripa & Ryan Seacrest	Yes	James Corden, Summer Fun Bargains, Freshen Up Your Home with Spray Paint	No
June 18	Kelly Ripa & Ryan Seacrest	Yes	Ilana Glazer, LIVE's Hometown Chefs Summer Cooking	No

=== July 2021 ===
Date	Co-hosts	"Host chat"	Guests / segments	"Kelly and Ryan's Inbox"
July 5	Kelly Ripa & Ryan Seacrest	Yes	LIVE's Stars and Stripes Celebration: Scarlett Johansson, Michael Symon, American Authors	No
July 6	Kelly Ripa & Ryan Seacrest	Yes	Riley Keough, LIVE's Summer Sun & Fun Week – Summer Travel Tips	Yes
July 7	Kelly Ripa & Ryan Seacrest	Yes	Vivica A. Fox, LIVE's Summer Sun & Fun Week – Water Safety	Yes
July 8	Kelly Ripa & Ryan Seacrest	Yes	Kelsey Grammer, LIVE's Summer Sun & Fun Week – Foods to Keep You Cool	Yes
July 9	Kelly Ripa & Ryan Seacrest	Yes	Daniel Radcliffe, LIVE's Hometown Chefs Summer Cooking, LIVE's Summer Sun & Fun Week – Planning a Family Staycation	No
July 12	Kelly Ripa & Ryan Seacrest	Yes	Kristin Chenoweth, LIVE's Amazing Kids Week – Marvin Mao	Yes
July 13	Kelly Ripa & Ryan Seacrest	Yes	Carla Gugino, Laurie Gelman, LIVE's Amazing Kids Week – Zalia Avant-Garde	No
July 14	Kelly Ripa & Ryan Seacrest	Yes	Sir Richard Branson, Curtis "50 Cent" Jackson, Maitreyi Ramakrishnan, LIVE's Amazing Kids Week – Akayla Gunn	Yes
July 15	Kelly Ripa & Ryan Seacrest	Yes	Emily Blunt, Bargains to Beat the Summer Heat, LIVE's Amazing Kids Week – Brigette Xie	No
July 16	Kelly Ripa & Ryan Seacrest	Yes	Keegan-Michael Key, LIVE's Hometown Chefs Summer Cooking, LIVE's Amazing Kids Week – Kashe Quest	No
July 19	Kelly Ripa & Ryan Seacrest	Yes	Henry Golding, LIVE @ Home Week – How to Pick the Right Paint for Your Project	Yes
July 20	Kelly Ripa & Ryan Seacrest	Yes	Mark Wahlberg, Finola Hughes, LIVE @ Home Week – Easy Bathroom Makeovers	Yes
July 21	Kelly Ripa & Ryan Seacrest	Yes	Emilia Clarke, Alessia Cara, LIVE @ Home Week – How to Create the Perfect Tablescape	Yes
July 22	Kelly Ripa & Ryan Seacrest	Yes	Zach Braff, Michael Consuelos, LIVE @ Home Week – Create Your Own Backyard Movie Theater	No
July 23	Kelly Ripa & Ryan Seacrest	Yes	Kate Beckinsale, LIVE's Hometown Chefs Summer Cooking, LIVE @ Home Week – Landscaping Made Easy	Yes
July 26	Ryan Seacrest & Tamron Hall	Yes	Allison Tolman, Craig Ferguson, LIVE's Fitfluencer Week – Full Body Workout	No
July 27	Ryan Seacrest & Sisanie	Yes	Robin Roberts, LIVE's Fitfluencer Week – Upper Body Workout	Yes
July 28	Ryan Seacrest & Maria Menounos	Yes	Minnie Driver, LIVE's Fitfluencer Week – Booty Burn Workout	Yes
July 29	Ryan Seacrest & Maria Menounos	Yes	Emily Mortimer, A Great Big World, LIVE's Fitfluencer Week – Pop Pilates Workout	Yes
July 30	Ryan Seacrest & Maria Menounos	Yes	Jay Pharoah, LIVE's Hometown Chefs Summer Cooking, LIVE's Fitfluencer Week – Ab Workout	No

=== August 2021 ===
Date	Co-hosts	"Host chat"	Guests / segments	"Kelly and Ryan's Inbox"
August 2	Ryan Seacrest & Katie Lowes	Yes	Idris Elba, Josh Peck, New York Auto Show Preview	Yes
August 3	Ryan Seacrest & Katie Lowes	Yes	Joseph Gordon-Levitt, Dr. Sandra Lee, Andy Grammer	Yes
August 4	Ryan Seacrest & Katie Lowes	Yes	Ryan Reynolds, Sean Kingston, Gelman's Birthday Surprise	Yes
August 5	Ryan Seacrest & Katie Lowes	Yes	Daveed Diggs, Bargains to Upgrade Your Life, STIHL Timber Sports Champion Martha King	No
August 6	Ryan Seacrest & Katie Lowes	Yes	Luke Bryan, Sign Spinning Champion Jacob Mitchell, LIVE's Hometown Chefs Summer Cooking	No
August 9	Ryan Seacrest & Ali Wentworth	Yes	Whitney Cummings, LIVE's Back in Business: Restaurant Food Made Easy Week – Melba Wilson	No
August 10	Ryan Seacrest & Ali Wentworth	Yes	Jennifer Hudson, LIVE's Back in Business: Restaurant Food Made Easy Week – Eric Ripert	No
August 11	Ryan Seacrest & Ali Wentworth	Yes	Sanaa Lathan, LIVE's Back in Business: Restaurant Food Made Easy Week – Maria Loi	No
August 12	Ryan Seacrest & Sebastian Maniscalco	Yes	Susan Kelechi Watson, Billy Ray Cyrus & Firerose, LIVE's Back in Business: Restaurant Food Made Easy Week – Anthony Scotto	No

== Season 34 (2021–2022) ==
=== September 2021 ===
Date	Co-hosts	"Host chat"	Guests / segments	"Kelly and Ryan's Inbox"
September 6	Kelly Ripa & Ryan Seacrest	Yes	LIVE's Labor Day Backyard Party: Bethenny Frankel, Dove Cameron, Michael Symon, Isaac Boots	No
September 7	Kelly Ripa & Ryan Seacrest	Yes	Jason Biggs, Addison Rae, LIVE Loves New York Week – Bagels	No
September 8	Kelly Ripa & Ryan Seacrest	Yes	Regina Hall, Blue Man Group, LIVE Loves New York Week – Entertainment Look Back & Pizza	No
September 9	Kelly Ripa & Ryan Seacrest	Yes	Amanda Peet, Padma Lakshmi, LIVE Loves New York Week – Tasty Travels & Chinese Food	No
September 10	Kelly Ripa & Ryan Seacrest	Yes	Jeff Daniels, Rachael Harris, LIVE Loves New York Week – 67th Street Look Back & Soul Food	No
September 13	Kelly Ripa & Ryan Seacrest	Yes	Gabrielle Union, Anastasia Pagonis, Daniil Medvedev, LIVE's Dinner on a Dime Week – Quiche Lorraine	No
September 14	Kelly Ripa & Ryan Seacrest	Yes	Ben Platt, Simone Biles, LIVE's Dinner on a Dime Week – Chicken Vaca Frita	Yes
September 15	Kelly Ripa & Ryan Seacrest	Yes	Diane Lane, LIVE's Dinner on a Dime Week – Kugel	Yes
September 16	Kelly Ripa & Ryan Seacrest	Yes	Jessica Chastain, LIVE's Dinner on a Dime Week – Warm Kale & Chicken Salad	Yes
September 17	Kelly Ripa & Ryan Seacrest	Yes	Ray Liotta, LIVE's Dinner on a Dime Week – Grilled Zucchini "Ravioli"	Yes
September 20	Kelly Ripa & Mark Consuelos	Yes	Scott Foley, LIVE's Record Breaker Week – Heaviest Vehicle Pulled	Yes
September 21	Kelly Ripa & Ryan Seacrest	Yes	Jeremy Sisto, CAM, LIVE's Record Breaker Week – Most Pencils in a Beard	Yes
September 22	Kelly Ripa & Ryan Seacrest	Yes	Anderson Cooper, Dulé Hill, LIVE's Record Breaker Week – Tallest Toilet Paper Tower	No
September 23	Kelly Ripa & Ryan Seacrest	Yes	Vanessa Hudgens, LIVE's Record Breaker Week – Most Effervescent Tablet Rockets Launched	Yes
September 24	Kelly Ripa & Ryan Seacrest	Yes	Liza Koshy, Fall Bargains, LIVE's Record Breaker Week – Fastest Time to Tape a Person to a Wall	No
September 27	Kelly Ripa & Mark Consuelos	Yes	Leslie Odom Jr., Vanessa Lachey, LIVE's Health Check Week – Heart Health	Yes
September 28	Kelly Ripa & Mark Consuelos	Yes	Jake Gyllenhaal, LIVE's Health Check Week – Women's Health	Yes
September 29	Kelly Ripa & Mark Consuelos	Yes	Chandra Wilson, MAX, LIVE's Health Check Week – Kid's Health	Yes
September 30	Kelly Ripa & Mark Consuelos	Yes	Demi Lovato, LIVE's Health Check Week – Men's Health	Yes

=== October 2021 ===
Date	Co-hosts	"Host chat"	Guests / segments	"Kelly and Ryan's Inbox"
October 1	Kelly Ripa & Mark Consuelos	Yes	Sarah Paulson, LIVE's Health Check Week – Cancer Prevention Tips	Yes
October 4	Kelly Ripa & Mark Consuelos	Yes	Rami Malek, Andy Grammer, DIY Fall Decor	No
October 5	Kelly Ripa & Mark Consuelos	Yes	Maura Tierney, Dr. Greg Yapalater, Laundry Tips	No
October 6	Kelly Ripa & Ryan Seacrest	Yes	Morris Chestnut, Dog Training Questions	Yes
October 7	Kelly Ripa & Ryan Seacrest	Yes	Anthony Anderson, Calum Scott, Pumpkin Cream Cold Brew Recipe	Yes
October 8	Kelly Ripa & Ryan Seacrest	Yes	Julianna Margulies, Ali Wentworth, Pickleball Lesson	No
October 11	Kelly Ripa & Ryan Seacrest	Yes	LIVE's Virtual Road Trip – Denver, Colorado: Beanie Feldstein, Chef Jen Jasinski	Yes
October 12	Kelly Ripa & Ryan Seacrest	Yes	LIVE's Virtual Road Trip – Nashville, Tennessee: Chelsea Handler, Brett Young, Chef Lakendra Davis	No
October 13	Kelly Ripa & Ryan Seacrest	Yes	LIVE's Virtual Road Trip – Montreal, Canada: Victoria Beckham, Caroline Rhea, Chef Annie Barsalou	No
October 14	Kelly Ripa & Ryan Seacrest	Yes	LIVE's Virtual Road Trip – Boston, Massachusetts: Anthony Michael Hall, Chef Jason Santos	No
October 15	Kelly Ripa & Ryan Seacrest	Yes	LIVE's Virtual Road Trip – Seattle, Washington: Rosario Dawson, Chef Renee Erickson	No
October 18	Kelly Ripa & Ryan Seacrest	Yes	Jamie Foxx, Hilarie Burton Morgan, Korean Black Bean Burger Recipe	No
October 19	Kelly Ripa & Ryan Seacrest	Yes	Eve, Michelle Young	Yes
October 20	Kelly Ripa & Ryan Seacrest	Yes	Mariska Hargitay, SISQO	Yes
October 21	Kelly Ripa & Ryan Seacrest	Yes	Bill Pullman, Tips for Travel	No
October 22	Kelly Ripa & Ryan Seacrest	Yes	Ricky Gervais, Bargains for a Better Night's Sleep	No
October 25	Kelly Ripa & Ryan Seacrest	Yes	Aidan Quinn, Darby Stanchfield, LIVE's Countdown to Halloween – DIY Face Mask Costumes	No
October 26	Kelly Ripa & Ryan Seacrest	Yes	Benedict Cumberbatch, Derek Hough, LIVE's Countdown to Halloween – Halloween Fun & Games	Yes
October 27	Kelly Ripa & Ryan Seacrest	Yes	Alan Cumming, LIVE's Countdown to Halloween – DIY Last-Minute Costumes	No
October 28	Kelly Ripa & Ryan Seacrest	Yes	John Leguizamo, Jorja Fox, LIVE's Countdown to Halloween – No Carve Pumpkins	Yes
October 29	Kelly Ripa & Ryan Seacrest	Yes	LIVE's Out of This World Halloween	No

=== November 2021 ===
Date	Co-hosts	"Host chat"	Guests / segments	"Kelly and Ryan's Inbox"
November 1	Kelly Ripa & Ryan Seacrest	Yes	Kumail Nanjiani, Anika Noni Rose	No
November 2	Kelly Ripa & Ryan Seacrest	Yes	Andy Cohen, Annaleigh Ashford	Yes
November 3	Kelly Ripa & Ryan Seacrest	Yes	Paula Patton, Freestyle Love Supreme	No
November 4	Kelly Ripa & Ryan Seacrest	Yes	Salma Hayek, Creative Alternatives for Holiday Shopping Shortages	No
November 5	Kelly Ripa & Ryan Seacrest	Yes	Fisher Stevens, Ryan Eggold, Dr. Jennifer Ashton	No
November 8	Ryan Seacrest & Ali Wentworth	Yes	Juliette Davis, Jordan Davis, LIVE's Fall Into Wellness Week – Mobility Moves	No
November 9	Ryan Seacrest & Ali Wentworth	Yes	Scottie Pippin, LIVE's Fall Into Wellness Week – Hydration Tips	Yes
November 10	Ryan Seacrest & Ali Wentworth	Yes	Lucy Hale, John Batiste, LIVE's Fall Into Wellness Week – Improving Air Quality	Yes
November 11	Ryan Seacrest & Ali Wentworth	Yes	Uzo Aduba, LIVE's Fall Into Wellness Week – Heat Therapy	Yes
November 12	Ryan Seacrest & Ali Wentworth	Yes	Jeff Goldblum, LIVE's Fall Into Wellness Week – Hygge	Yes
November 15	Kelly Ripa & Ryan Seacrest	Yes	Ellie Kemper, Kelsea Ballerini, LIVE's Holiday Gift Guide – DIY Gift Baskets	No
November 16	Kelly Ripa & Ryan Seacrest	Yes	Jamie Dornan, Dwyane Wade, LIVE's Holiday Gift Guide – Gifts that Give Back	Yes
November 17	Kelly Ripa & Ryan Seacrest	Yes	Brooke Shields, Kathleen Turner, LIVE's Holiday Gift Guide – Tech Gifts Under $50	Yes
November 18	Kelly Ripa & Ryan Seacrest	Yes	Andrew Garfield, LIVE's Holiday Gift Guide – Chris Byrne	Yes
November 19	Kelly Ripa & Ryan Seacrest	Yes	Kevin Hart, Lea Michele, LIVE's Holiday Gift Guide – Holiday Gift Bargains	No
November 22	Kelly Ripa & Ryan Seacrest	Yes	Halle Berry, David Muir, LIVE's Thanksgiving Family Cooking Week – Ryan, Meredith & Flora	No
November 23	Kelly Ripa & Ryan Seacrest	Yes	Tony Goldwyn, Kristin Chenoweth, LIVE's Thanksgiving Family Cooking Week – Kelly & Michael	Yes
November 24	Kelly Ripa & Ryan Seacrest	Yes	Jeremy Renner, LIVE's Thanksgiving Family Cooking Week – Gelman & Misha	Yes
November 29	Kelly Ripa & Ryan Seacrest	Yes	Ansel Elgort, Harry Hamlin	Yes
November 30	Kelly Ripa & Ryan Seacrest	Yes	Vanessa Williams, Ariana DeBose	Yes

=== December 2021 ===
Date	Co-hosts	"Host chat"	Guests / segments	"Kelly and Ryan's Inbox"
December 1	Kelly Ripa & Ryan Seacrest	Yes	Rita Moreno, Nicholas Braun, Jelly Doughnut Recipe	Yes
December 2	Kelly Ripa & Ryan Seacrest	Yes	Nicole Kidman, Holly Robinson Peete, Outdoor Holiday Decorating Tips	Yes
December 3	Kelly Ripa & Ryan Seacrest	Yes	Rachel Zegler, Dr. Alok Patel, Holiday Gift Bargains	No
December 6	Kelly Ripa & Ryan Seacrest	Yes	Joey Fatone, Jordan Fisher	Yes
December 7	Kelly Ripa & Ryan Seacrest	Yes	Kristin Davis, Carson Kressley	Yes
December 8	Kelly Ripa & Ryan Seacrest	Yes	Cynthia Nixon, Heather Graham, Avoiding Holiday Scams	No
December 9	Kelly Ripa & Ryan Seacrest	Yes	Michael B. Jordan, Bridget Moynahan	Yes
December 10	Kelly Ripa & Ryan Seacrest	Yes	Elton John, Katie Couric, Holiday Wreaths	No
December 13	Kelly Ripa & Mark Consuelos	Yes	Jonathan Groff, LIVE's Holiday Cooking Dream Team Week – Michael Symon	No
December 14	Kelly Ripa & Mark Consuelos	Yes	Henry Cavill, LIVE's Holiday Cooking Dream Team Week – Melba Wilson	No
December 15	Kelly Ripa & Mark Consuelos	Yes	Matthew McConaughey, LIVE's Holiday Cooking Dream Team Week – Eric Ripert	No
December 16	Kelly Ripa & Dondré Whitfield	Yes	Keanu Reeves, LIVE's Holiday Cooking Dream Team Week – Maria Loi	Yes
December 17	Kelly Ripa & Ryan Seacrest	Yes	LIVE's Holiday Sweater Party: Method Man, Shaggy, Virtual Audience Sweater Pageant	No
December 20	Kelly Ripa & Ryan Seacrest	Yes	Jason Biggs, Kristin Chenoweth, DIY Gift Wrapping	No
December 21	Kelly Ripa & Ryan Seacrest	Yes	Fred Savage, Steve Patterson, Coping with Holiday Stress	No
December 22	Kelly Ripa & Ryan Seacrest	Yes	LIVE's A Very New York Christmas Special: Josh Groban, Steve Patterson, The Northwell Health Nurse Choir, Radio City Rockettes, Santa	No
December 27	Kelly Ripa & Ryan Seacrest	Yes	Kal Penn, Naturi Naughton, Chef Scott Conant	No

=== January 2022 ===
Date	Co-hosts	"Host chat"	Guests / segments	"Kelly and Ryan's Inbox"
January 3	Kelly Ripa & Ryan Seacrest	Yes	Ralph Macchio, Clayton Echard, LIVE's New You in '22 – Getting Organized	No
January 4	Kelly Ripa & Ryan Seacrest	Yes	Tracee Ellis Ross, Mayim Bialik, LIVE's New You in '22 – Cutting Down on Screen Time	No
January 5	Kelly Ripa & Ryan Seacrest	Yes	David Arquette, Oliver Hudson, LIVE's New You in '22 – Restolutions	No
January 6	Kelly Ripa & Ryan Seacrest	Yes	Anthony Anderson, Quinta Brunson, LIVE's New You in '22 – Dry January	No
January 7	Kelly Ripa & Ryan Seacrest	Yes	Brandy, Ana Gasteyer, LIVE's New You in '22 – Getting Financially Fit	No
January 10	Kelly Ripa & Ryan Seacrest	Yes	Selena Gomez, Ginger Zee, LIVE's New You in '22 – Healthy Take-Out Food Swaps	No
January 11	Kelly Ripa & Ryan Seacrest	Yes	Jamie Dornan, Maggie Q, LIVE's New You in '22 – Simple Swaps for Junk Food	No
January 12	Kelly Ripa & Ryan Seacrest	Yes	Denzel Washington, Lindsey Vonn, LIVE's New You in '22 – Sugar Swaps	No
January 13	Kelly Ripa & Ryan Seacrest	Yes	Isla Fisher, Ginnifer Goodwin, LIVE's New You in '22 – Vegan Food Swaps	No
January 14	Kelly Ripa & Ryan Seacrest	Yes	Steve Harvey, Ming-Na Wen, LIVE's New You in '22 – Healthy Drink Swaps	No
January 17	Kelly Ripa & Ryan Seacrest	Yes	Ricky Gervais, LIVE's New You in '22 – At Home Fat Burning Workout	Yes
January 18	Kelly Ripa & Ryan Seacrest	Yes	Hilary Duff, Brian Cox, LIVE's New You in '22 – Full Body Workout	No
January 19	Kelly Ripa & Ryan Seacrest	Yes	Jenna Dewan, Sydney Sweeney, LIVE's New You in '22 – Core Workout	No
January 20	Kelly Ripa & Ryan Seacrest	Yes	David Boreanaz, Rest and Wellness Bargains, LIVE's New You in '22 – Kickboxing Bootcamp	Yes
January 21	Kelly Ripa & Ryan Seacrest	Yes	Andy Samberg, Edi Patterson, LIVE's New You in '22 – Booty Workout	No
January 24	Kelly Ripa & Ryan Seacrest	Yes	Kristen Stewart, Lacey Chabert, LIVE's New You in '22 – Recognizing Mental Health Problems	No
January 25	Kelly Ripa & Ryan Seacrest	Yes	Curtis "50 Cent" Jackson, Sonia Sotomayor, LIVE's New You in '22 – Learning About Forgetfulness	No
January 26	Kelly Ripa & Ryan Seacrest	Yes	John Goodman, Henry Lundqvist, LIVE's New You in '22 – Recognizing Signs of Addiction	No
January 27	Kelly Ripa & Ryan Seacrest	Yes	Tom Selleck, LIVE's New You in '22 – Recognizing Depression vs. Anxiety	No
January 28	Kelly Ripa & Ryan Seacrest	Yes	LIVE's Viewer's Choice Show 2021	No
January 31	Kelly Ripa & Ryan Seacrest	Yes	Matt Czuchry, LIVE's New You in '22 – Keep Your Heart Healthy	Yes

=== February 2022 ===
Date	Co-hosts	"Host chat"	Guests / Segments	"Kelly and Ryan's Inbox"
February 1	Kelly Ripa & Ryan Seacrest	Yes	Lisa Edelstein, Recipes for Lunar New Year	Yes
February 2	Kelly Ripa & Ryan Seacrest	Yes	Laura Linney, Supporting Your Immune System	Yes
February 3	Kelly Ripa & Ryan Seacrest	Yes	Jennifer Lopez, Green Goddess Salad Recipe	No
February 4	Kelly Ripa & Ryan Seacrest	Yes	David Oyelowo, Dr. Jennifer Ashton, Calum Scott	No
February 7	Kelly Ripa	Yes	Laverne Cox, LIVE's Game Day Grub Week – Kung Pao Chicken Wings	No
February 8	Kelly Ripa & Ryan Seacrest	Yes	Wendi McLendon-Covey, LIVE's Game Day Grub Week – Beef Skewers	Yes
February 9	Kelly Ripa & Ryan Seacrest	Yes	Daveed Diggs, LIVE's Game Day Grub Week – Creole Shrimp Toast	Yes
February 10	Kelly Ripa & Ryan Seacrest	Yes	Dennis Haysbert, LIVE's Game Day Grub Week – Baby Back Ribs	No
February 11	Kelly Ripa & Ryan Seacrest	Yes	Maddy Brum, Dr. Sandra Lee, LIVE's Game Day Grub Week – Chicken Parm Bites	No
February 14	Kelly Ripa & Ryan Seacrest	Yes	LIVE's Valentine's Day Special: Ali Wentworth & George Stephanopoulos, Steve Patterson	Yes
February 15	Kelly Ripa & Ryan Seacrest	Yes	Anna Chlumsky, At-Home Stretching Workout	Yes
February 16	Kelly Ripa & Mark Consuelos	Yes	Channing Tatum, Shaun White, Tips for Managing Empty Nest Syndrome	No
February 17	Kelly Ripa & Ryan Seacrest	Yes	Jesse Williams, Winter Travel Tips	Yes
February 18	Kelly Ripa & Ryan Seacrest	Yes	Tom Holland, Trendy Crafts	No
February 21	Kelly Ripa & David Muir	Yes	Jesse Palmer, Hands-Only CPR Techniques, A Great Big World	Yes
February 22	Kelly Ripa & Ryan Seacrest	Yes	Katy Perry, Luke Bryan & Lionel Richie; Food IQ	No
February 23	Kelly Ripa & Ryan Seacrest	Yes	Sophia Bush, Alana Haim	Yes
February 24	Kelly Ripa & Ryan Seacrest	Yes	Mark Cuban, Satisfying Crafts	Yes
February 25	Kelly Ripa & Ryan Seacrest	Yes	Anderson Cooper, Problem-Solving Bargains	No
February 28	Ryan Seacrest & Ali Wentworth	Yes	Morris Chestnut, Molly Sims, Avoiding Romance Scams	Yes

=== March 2022 ===
Date	Co-hosts	"Host chat"	Guests / Segments	"Kelly and Ryan's Inbox"
March 1	Ryan Seacrest & Ali Wentworth	Yes	Nikolaj Coster-Waldau, Functional Endurance Workout	Yes
March 2	Ryan Seacrest & Carson Kressley	Yes	Omari Hardwick, Ben Rector, Caffeine Quiz	Yes
March 3	Ryan Seacrest & Maria Menounos	Yes	Clayton Echard, Sheryl Lee Ralph, How to Beat Inflation	Yes
March 4	Ryan Seacrest & Maria Menounos	Yes	Sam Heughan, Norm Lewis, How to Unplug	Yes
March 7	Kelly Ripa & Mark Consuelos	Yes	Jeffrey Wright, LIVE's Recipe Rewind – Peanut Butter & Jelly	Yes
March 8	Ryan Seacrest & Bethenny Frankel	Yes	Brittany Snow, LIVE's Recipe Rewind – Cheesecake	Yes
March 9	Ryan Seacrest & Melba Wilson	Yes	Naveen Andrews, Caroline Rhea, LIVE's Recipe Rewind – Chicken & Waffles	No
March 10	Ryan Seacrest & Shay Mitchell	Yes	Jeremy Sisto, Justin Bruening, LIVE's Recipe Rewind – Caesar Salad	No
March 11	Kelly Ripa & Ryan Seacrest	Yes	Ally Sheedy, LIVE's Recipe Rewind – Chili con Carne	No
March 14	Kelly Ripa & Ryan Seacrest	Yes	Kim Raver, Laundry Tips	No
March 21	Kelly Ripa & Ryan Seacrest	Yes	Michael Chiklis, Katheryn Winnick, LIVE's Hollyword Game Week – Movie Word Search	No
March 22	Kelly Ripa & Ryan Seacrest	Yes	Sandra Bullock, Jane Krakowski, LIVE's Hollyword Game Week – A Word Too Many	No
March 23	Kelly Ripa & Ryan Seacrest	Yes	Lily Collins, Emmanuel Acho, LIVE's Hollyword Game Week – No "Live" at the Oscars	No
March 24	Kelly Ripa & Ryan Seacrest	Yes	Jesse Tyler Ferguson, Simone Ashley, LIVE's Hollyword Game Week – Oscar Word Jumble	Yes
March 25	Kelly Ripa & Ryan Seacrest	Yes	LIVE's Pre-Oscar Celebration: Maria Menounos, Adrien Brody, Sandy Kenyon, Know Your Oscars, Oscar Moments and Memories, LIVE's Hollyword Game Week – Movie Crossword Puzzle	No
March 28	Kelly Ripa & Ryan Seacrest	Yes	LIVE's After Oscar Show: Maria Menounos, Jessica Chastain, Finneas & Billie Eilish, Troy Kotsur, Ariana DeBose, Cast of CODA, Carson Kressley & Eva Chen, Oscar Memories	No
March 29	Kelly Ripa & Ryan Seacrest	Yes	Elle Fanning, Raven-Symoné, LIVE's New You in '22 – Skincare at Any Age	No
March 30	Kelly Ripa & Ryan Seacrest	Yes	Leslie Mann, LIVE's New You in '22 – Self-Care During COVID-19	Yes
March 31	Kelly Ripa & Ryan Seacrest	Yes	Wilmer Valderrama, Happy At-Home Bargains, LIVE's New You in '22 – Managing Diabetes Risk	Yes

=== April 2022 ===
Date	Co-hosts	"Host chat"	Guests / Segments	"Kelly and Ryan's Inbox"
April 1	Kelly Ripa & Ryan Seacrest	Yes	Ethan Hawke, LIVE's New You in '22 – Maintaining Gut Health	Yes
April 4	Kelly Ripa & Ryan Seacrest	Yes	Oscar Isaac, Rupert Friend, LIVE's Spring Has Sprung Week – DIY Spring Decor	No
April 5	Kelly Ripa & Ryan Seacrest	Yes	Matthew Broderick, LIVE's Spring Has Sprung Week – Springtime Cooking Ideas	Yes
April 6	Kelly Ripa & Ryan Seacrest	Yes	Eddie Redmayne, LIVE's Spring Has Sprung Week – Tips to Manage Allergies	Yes
April 7	Kelly Ripa & Ryan Seacrest	Yes	Mark Wahlberg, LIVE's Spring Has Sprung Week – Spring Gardening Tips	Yes
April 8	Kelly Ripa & Ryan Seacrest	Yes	Michelle Pfeiffer, LIVE's Spring Has Sprung Week – Decluttering and Organizing Tips	Yes
April 11	Kelly Ripa & Ryan Seacrest	Yes	Idris Elba, LIVE's Auto Week – Fuel Efficiency Tips	Yes
April 12	Kelly Ripa & Ryan Seacrest	Yes	Dylan McDermott, Robin Roberts, LIVE's Auto Week – DIY Car Washing Tips	No
April 13	Kelly Ripa & Ryan Seacrest	Yes	Hugh Laurie, LIVE's Auto Week – Electric Cars	Yes
April 14	Kelly Ripa & Ryan Seacrest	Yes	Josh Brolin, Aya Cash, LIVE's Auto Week – Rugged and Refined Cars	No
April 15	Kelly Ripa & Ryan Seacrest	Yes	Kim Kardashian, Laundry Tips, LIVE's Auto Week – Steve Patterson at the New York Auto Show	No
April 18	Kelly Ripa & Ryan Seacrest	Yes	Diane Kruger, Quincy Isaiah, LIVE's Go Green Week – Green Week Bargains	Yes
April 19	Kelly Ripa & Ryan Seacrest	Yes	Janelle Monáe, Marlon Wayans, LIVE's Go Green Week – Recycling Tips	No
April 20	Kelly Ripa & Ryan Seacrest	Yes	Rosie Perez, Niecy Nash, LIVE's Go Green Week – Green Cleaning Tips	Yes
April 21	Kelly Ripa & Ryan Seacrest	Yes	Alexander Skarsgård, LIVE's Go Green Week – Composting 101	Yes
April 22	Kelly Ripa & Ryan Seacrest	Yes	Nathan Fillion, LIVE's Go Green Week – Don't Waste Your Waste	Yes
April 25	Kelly Ripa & Ryan Seacrest	Yes	Debra Messing, Chef Eric Ripért	Yes
April 26	Kelly Ripa & Mark Consuelos	Yes	Miles Teller, Jamie-Lynn Sigler, Rhett & Link	No
April 27	Kelly Ripa & Ryan Seacrest	Yes	Elisabeth Moss, Choosing Sleep Supplements	Yes
April 28	Kelly Ripa & Ryan Seacrest	Yes	Dulé Hill, Spring Dog Safety Tips	No
April 29	Kelly Ripa & Ryan Seacrest	Yes	David Spade, Growing Your Money Tips	Yes

=== May 2022 ===
Date	Co-hosts	"Host chat"	Guests / Segments	"Kelly and Ryan's Inbox"
May 2	Kelly Ripa & Ryan Seacrest	Yes	Jenna Dewan, LIVE's I Love Mom Week – Mother's Day Gift for Yourself	Yes
May 3	Kelly Ripa & Ryan Seacrest	Yes	Chris O'Donnell, Jennifer Grey, LIVE's I Love Mom Week – Mom's Inbox	Yes
May 4	Kelly Ripa & Ryan Seacrest	Yes	Benedict Cumberbatch, LIVE's I Love Mom Week – DIY Mother's Day Bouquets	Yes
May 5	Kelly Ripa & Ryan Seacrest	Yes	Rebel Wilson, LIVE's I Love Mom Week – DIY Mother's Day Gift Baskets	Yes
May 6	Kelly Ripa & Ryan Seacrest	Yes	LIVE's I Love Mom Special: Elizabeth Olsen, Steve Patterson	Yes
May 9	Kelly Ripa & Ryan Seacrest	Yes	LIVE's Virtual Road Trip – Houston: Norman Reedus, Chef Evelyn Garcia	Yes
May 10	Ryan Seacrest & Ali Wentworth	Yes	LIVE's Virtual Road Trip – New Orleans: Melissa Gilbert, Ken Jeong, Chef Mason Hereford	No
May 11	Ryan Seacrest & Ali Wentworth	Yes	LIVE's Virtual Road Trip – Washington, D.C.: Mike Myers, Chef Joancarlo Parkhurst	Yes
May 12	Ryan Seacrest & Maria Menounos	Yes	LIVE's Virtual Road Trip – Charleston: Jean Smart, Howie Mandel, Chef Mike Lata	No
May 13	Ryan Seacrest & Maria Menounos	Yes	LIVE's Virtual Road Trip – Sacramento: Julianne Hough, Chef Chris Barnum-Dann	No
May 16	Ryan Seacrest & Bethenny Frankel	Yes	Hugh Dancy, LIVE's Beat the Heat Week – Swim Safety	No
May 17	Ryan Seacrest & Jane Krakowski	Yes	Jenna Fischer & Angela Kinsey; Freddie Highmore, LIVE's Beat the Heat Week – Summer Travel Tips	No
May 18	Ryan Seacrest & Caroline Rhea	Yes	Ricky Gervais, Quinta Brunson, LIVE's Beat the Heat Week – Creating an Outdoor Living Space	Yes
May 19	Ryan Seacrest & Emmy Rossum	Yes	Judd Apatow, LIVE's Beat the Heat Week – Ultimate Beach Survival Kit	Yes
May 20	Ryan Seacrest & Vanessa Lachey	Yes	Josh Gad, Colton Underwood, LIVE's Beat the Heat Week – Hottest Summer Toys	Yes
May 23	Kelly Ripa & Ryan Seacrest	Yes	Seth Meyers, Behind the Scenes of American Idol, Noah Thompson	Yes
May 24	Kelly Ripa & Ryan Seacrest	Yes	Jennifer Connelly, Ewan McGregor, Laundry Tips	No
May 25	Kelly Ripa & Ryan Seacrest	Yes	Camilla Luddington, Gaten Matarazzo	Yes
May 26	Kelly Ripa & Ryan Seacrest	Yes	Jon Hamm, Summer Bargains, HunterGirl	No
May 27	Kelly Ripa & Ryan Seacrest	Yes	Blair Underwood, John Salley, Fritz Hager, LIVE's Foodfluencer Friday Face-Off	No
May 30	Ryan Seacrest & Ali Wentworth	Yes	Debi Mazar, Sunny Anderson, Pia Toscano	No
May 31	Kelly Ripa & Ryan Seacrest	Yes	Eric Dane, Katrina Lenk, Mental Health Blueprint	Yes

=== June 2022 ===
Date	Co-hosts	"Host chat"	Guests / Segments	"Kelly and Ryan's Inbox"
June 1	Kelly Ripa & Ryan Seacrest	Yes	Bowen Yang, Summer Cleaning Tips	Yes
June 2	Kelly Ripa & Ryan Seacrest	Yes	Jane Lynch, Anika Noni Rose, Katharine McPhee & David Foster	No
June 3	Kelly Ripa & Ryan Seacrest	Yes	Marilu Henner, Noah Reid, LIVE's Foodfluencer Friday Face-Off	No
June 6	Kelly Ripa & Ryan Seacrest	Yes	James Patterson, Behind the Scenes at Wango Tango, LIVE's Summer School Week – Harini Logan	Yes
June 7	Kelly Ripa & Ryan Seacrest	Yes	Jensen Ackles, Max Frost, LIVE's Summer School Week – All About Feet	Yes
June 8	Ryan Seacrest & Ali Wentworth	Yes	Laura Dern, Iman Vellani, LIVE's Summer School Week – WiFi Tech Tips	Yes
June 9	Ryan Seacrest & Déjà Vu	Yes	Simu Liu, Allan Yuan, LIVE's Summer School Week – Mexican Recipes	No
June 10	Kelly Ripa & Ryan Seacrest	Yes	Patina Miller, Michael Cimino, LIVE's Foodfluencer Friday Face-Off	No
June 13	Kelly Ripa & Ryan Seacrest	Yes	Amy Brenneman, Constance Wu, Train feat. Sofia Reyes, LIVE's Pawfect Match Week – Basic Training Tips	No
June 14	Kelly Ripa & Ryan Seacrest	Yes	Bryan Cranston, James Brolin, LIVE's Pawfect Match Week – LIVE Staff Dog Adoptions	No
June 15	Kelly Ripa & Ryan Seacrest	Yes	Rainn Wilson, Hailey Bieber, LIVE's Pawfect Match Week – Steve Patterson Meets the Dogs of Central Park	No
June 16	Kelly Ripa & Ryan Seacrest	Yes	Andy Garcia, Keke Palmer, LIVE's Pawfect Match Week – Doggie Makeovers	Yes
June 17	Kelly Ripa & Ryan Seacrest	Yes	Vanessa Williams, LIVE's Foodfluencer Friday Face-Off, LIVE's Pawfect Match Week – Beat the Heat	No
June 20	Kelly Ripa & Ryan Seacrest	Yes	Antonio Banderas, Nutrition and Oral Health Tips	Yes
June 27	Kelly Ripa & Ryan Seacrest	Yes	Chelsea Handler, Summer Made Easy Bargains, Summer Crafts for Kids	Yes

=== July 2022 ===
Date	Co-hosts	"Host chat"	Guests / Segments	"Kelly and Ryan's Inbox"
July 4	Kelly Ripa & Ryan Seacrest	Yes	LIVE's Fourth of July Party: Janelle James, The Goo Goo Dolls, LIVE's Fourth of July Games	No
July 5	Kelly Ripa & Ryan Seacrest	Yes	Vivica A. Fox, How to Money	Yes
July 6	Kelly Ripa & Ryan Seacrest	Yes	Rachel Dratch, Bernadette Peters, Upgrade Your Home for Under $100	Yes
July 7	Kelly Ripa & Ryan Seacrest	Yes	Gabby Windey & Rachel Recchia; Meg Donnelly, Trending Summer Fun Activities	No
July 8	Kelly Ripa & Ryan Seacrest	Yes	Sutton Foster, Summer Bargains, LIVE's Foodfluencer Friday Face-Off	No
July 11	Kelly Ripa & Ryan Seacrest	Yes	Dave Coulier, Kevin & Frankie Jonas	Yes
July 12	Kelly Ripa & Ryan Seacrest	Yes	Wanda Sykes, Daisy Edgar-Jones	Yes
July 13	Kelly Ripa & Ryan Seacrest	Yes	Matthew Modine, Jeremy Allen White	Yes
July 14	Kelly Ripa & Ryan Seacrest	Yes	Jenny Mollen, Avoiding Kid Scams	Yes
July 15	Kelly Ripa & Ryan Seacrest	Yes	Milo Manheim, The Bella Twins, LIVE's Foodfluencer Friday Face-Off	No
July 18	Kelly Ripa & Ryan Seacrest	Yes	Andy Cohen, Joe Keery, LIVE's Guide to a Healthy Summer – Summertime Food Swaps	Yes
July 19	Kelly Ripa & Ryan Seacrest	Yes	Cat Deeley, Christina Perri, LIVE's Guide to a Healthy Summer – Summer Dangers	Yes
July 20	Kelly Ripa & Ryan Seacrest	Yes	David Muir, Bailee Madison, LIVE's Guide to a Healthy Summer – The Benefits of Sun	No
July 21	Kelly Ripa & Ryan Seacrest	Yes	Kate McKinnon, Joshua Bassett	Yes
July 22	Kelly Ripa & Ryan Seacrest	Yes	Amanda Seyfried, Summer Skin and Beauty Bargains, LIVE's Foodfluencer Friday Face-Off	No
July 25	Kelly Ripa & Ryan Seacrest	Yes	Sofia Carson, Retta, LIVE's Ready or Not Week – Prepare Your Emergency Car Kit	Yes
July 26	Kelly Ripa & Ryan Seacrest	Yes	Whitney Cummings, Sarah Drew, LIVE's Ready or Not Week – Sewing Kit Essentials	Yes
July 27	Kelly Ripa & Ryan Seacrest	Yes	Lisa Rinna, Jenny Slate, LIVE's Ready or Not Week – First Aid Kit Essentials	Yes
July 28	Kelly Ripa & Ryan Seacrest	Yes	Cara Delevingne, Tisha Campbell, LIVE's Ready or Not Week – Outdoor Survival Kit Essentials	Yes
July 29	Kelly Ripa & Ryan Seacrest	Yes	Renée Elise Goldsberry, LIVE's Foodfluencer Friday Face-Off, LIVE's Ready or Not Week – Emergency Evacuation Kit Essentials	No

=== August 2022 ===
Date	Co-hosts	"Host chat"	Guests / Segments	"Kelly and Ryan's Inbox"
August 1	Ryan Seacrest & Luke Bryan	Yes	Diego Luna, LIVE's Cooked to Perfection Week – Michael Symon	Yes
August 2	Ryan Seacrest & Carson Kressley	Yes	Joel McHale, Laurie Gelman, LIVE's Cooked to Perfection Week – Gaby Dalkin	Yes
August 3	Ryan Seacrest & Ali Wentworth	Yes	Maria Bakalova, LIVE's Cooked to Perfection Week – Melba Wilson	Yes
August 4	Ryan Seacrest & Tamron Hall	Yes	Gavin Casalegno, Jesse Williams, O. A. R.	Yes
August 5	Ryan Seacrest & Déjà Vu	Yes	Isabella Rossellini, Maia Mitchell, LIVE's Foodfluencer Friday Face-Off	No
August 8	Ryan Seacrest & Katie Lowes	Yes	William Jackson Harper, LIVE's Back 2 Back Bargains, Steve Patterson Visits the Edge	Yes
August 9	Ryan Seacrest & Katie Lowes	Yes	Julia Stiles, Danielle Brooks, LIVE's Back 2 Back Bargains, Steve Patterson Visits the High Line	No
August 10	Ryan Seacrest & Lisa Rinna	Yes	Michaela Jaé Rodriguez, Gugu Mbatha-Raw, Steve Patterson Visits the Museum of Ice Cream	Yes
August 11	Ryan Seacrest & Caroline Rhea	Yes	Maya Hawke, Ben Rector, Summer Phobias	Yes
August 12	Ryan Seacrest & Ali Wentworth	Yes	Zazie Beetz, Summer Fruits & Vegetables	Yes
August 15	Kelly Ripa & Ryan Seacrest	Yes	Dr. Sandra Lee, Aasif Mandvi, Ayo Edebiri	No
August 22	Kelly Ripa & Ryan Seacrest	Yes	Mark Wahlberg, Ginger Gonzaga, Tips for Better Back-to-School Lunches	No
August 29	Kelly Ripa & Ryan Seacrest	Yes	Yara Shahidi, Kal Penn, Tips for Back-to-School Conversations with Kids	Yes

== Season 35 (2022–2023) ==
=== September 2022 ===
Date	Co-hosts	"Host chat"	Guests / segments	"Kelly and Ryan's Inbox"
September 5	Kelly Ripa & Ryan Seacrest	Yes	Justin Long, Caroline Rhea, Travel Tips and Tricks, Steve Patterson Visits Art Moore's Closet	Yes
September 6	Kelly Ripa & Ryan Seacrest	Yes	Regina Hall, Betty Gilpin, LIVE's Favorite Firsts Week – Ryan's First Show	No
September 7	Kelly Ripa & Ryan Seacrest	Yes	Susan Sarandon, Jesse Palmer, LIVE's Favorite Firsts Week – First Out-of-Studio Assignment	Yes
September 8	Kelly Ripa & Ryan Seacrest	Yes	Keegan-Michael Key, Jane Krakowski, LIVE's Favorite Firsts Week – Ryan's First Fall	No
September 9	Kelly Ripa & Ryan Seacrest	Yes	5ive with Kelly and Ryan	No
September 12	Kelly Ripa & Ryan Seacrest	Yes	Lorraine Braco, Marcus Scribner, LIVE's Record Breaker Week	No
September 13	Kelly Ripa & Ryan Seacrest	Yes	Derek Hough, Jenny Mollen, LIVE's Record Breaker Week	Yes
September 14	Kelly Ripa & Ryan Seacrest	Yes	Naomi Watts, Tamron Hall, LIVE's Record Breaker Week	Yes
September 15	Kelly Ripa & Ryan Seacrest	Yes	Topher Grace, Jimmy Chin, LIVE's Record Breaker Week	No
September 16	Kelly Ripa & Ryan Seacrest	Yes	Ryan Reynolds, LeAnn Rimes, LIVE's Record Breaker Week	No
September 20	Kelly Ripa & Ryan Seacrest	Yes	Omar Epps, Billy Eichner	Yes
September 21	Kelly Ripa & Ryan Seacrest	Yes	Tyler Perry; Gabby Windey & Rachel Recchia	Yes
September 22	Kelly Ripa & Ryan Seacrest	Yes	Reba McEntire, Lou Diamond Phillips, Fall Home Bargains	No
September 23	Kelly Ripa & Ryan Seacrest	Yes	Niecy Nash-Betts, Paul Walter Hauser	Yes
September 26	Kelly Ripa & Ryan Seacrest	Yes	Kim Kardashian, How to Make the Perfect Brisket	No
September 27	Kelly Ripa & Mark Consuelos	Yes	Lauren Graham, Idina Menzel	Yes
September 28	Kelly Ripa & Ryan Seacrest	Yes	Jimmy Kimmel, Mark Cuban, Behind-the-Scenes at iHeartRadio Music Festival	No
September 29	Kelly Ripa & Ryan Seacrest	Yes	Jimmy Smits, Alfonso Ribiero	Yes
September 30	Kelly Ripa & Ryan Seacrest	Yes	Tyra Banks, Anderson Cooper	No

=== October 2022 ===
Date	Co-hosts	"Host chat"	Guests / segments	"Kelly and Ryan's Inbox"
October 3	Kelly Ripa & Ryan Seacrest	Yes	Jerry O'Connell & Rebecca Romijn; Colin Hanks	No
October 4	Kelly Ripa & Ryan Seacrest	Yes	Jimmy Fallon, Carne Asada Taco Recipe	No
October 5	Kelly Ripa & Ryan Seacrest	Yes	Hilary Swank, Lea Thompson	Yes
October 6	Kelly Ripa & Ryan Seacrest	Yes	Jenna Dewan, David Boreanaz, Steve Patterson Visits the Hudson	No
October 7	Kelly Ripa & Ryan Seacrest	Yes	George Stephanopoulos, Max Frost, Cornhole World Champions	No
October 10	Kelly Ripa & Ryan Seacrest	Yes	Henrik Lundqvist, Michael Consuelos, LIVE's Common Cents Finance Week – Grocery Store Savings	No
October 11	Kelly Ripa & Mark Consuelos	Yes	Geena Davis, Kaitlyn Dever, LIVE's Common Cents Finance Week – Financial Etiquette	No
October 12	Kelly Ripa & Mark Consuelos	Yes	Marlon Wayans, John Stamos, LIVE's Common Cents Finance Week – Saving Strategies for Inflation	No
October 13	Kelly Ripa & Mark Consuelos	Yes	Noah Centineo, Charlie Puth, LIVE's Common Cents Finance Week – Holiday Savings	No
October 14	Kelly Ripa & Mark Consuelos	Yes	Dwayne Johnson, LIVE's Common Cents Finance Week – Home Buying Tips	No
October 17	Kelly Ripa & Ryan Seacrest	Yes	Michael Bublé, Ralph Macchio	Yes
October 18	Kelly Ripa & Ryan Seacrest	Yes	Jesse Tyler Ferguson, Katheryn Winnick, Flu Season Tips	Yes
October 19	Kelly Ripa & Ryan Seacrest	Yes	Dale Earnhardt, Jr., Double Apple Dutch Baby Recipe	Yes
October 20	Kelly Ripa & Ryan Seacrest	Yes	Ali Wentworth, Tyler James Williams, Comfort Bargains, New York's Largest Pumpkin	No
October 21	Kelly Ripa & Ryan Seacrest	Yes	Quinta Brunson, Trending Tips for Halloween, Train	Yes
October 24	Kelly Ripa & Ryan Seacrest	Yes	John David Washington, LIVE's Countdown to Halloween Week – No Carve Pumpkins	Yes
October 25	Kelly Ripa & Ryan Seacrest	Yes	Randall Park, Ncuti Gatwa, LIVE's Countdown to Halloween Week – DIY Outdoor Halloween Décor	No
October 26	Kelly Ripa & Ryan Seacrest	Yes	Alan Cumming, Tony Hale, LIVE's Countdown to Halloween Week – Halloween Party Tips	Yes
October 27	Kelly Ripa & Ryan Seacrest	Yes	Michael Imperioli, LIVE's Countdown to Halloween Week – Last Minute Halloween Costumes	Yes
October 28	Kelly Ripa & Ryan Seacrest	Yes	Henry Cavill, Jaime Pressly, LIVE's Countdown to Halloween Week	No
October 31	Kelly Ripa & Ryan Seacrest	Yes	LIVE's Multiverse Halloween: The Best in the Universe	No

=== November 2022 ===
Date	Co-hosts	"Host chat"	Guests / segments	"Kelly and Ryan's Inbox"
November 1	Kelly Ripa & Ryan Seacrest	Yes	Lupita Nyong'o, Sheryl Lee Ralph	Yes
November 2	Kelly Ripa & Ryan Seacrest	Yes	Daniel Radcliffe, Carrie Ann Inaba	Yes
November 3	Kelly Ripa & Ryan Seacrest	Yes	Danai Gurira, Jake Lacy	Yes
November 4	Kelly Ripa & Ryan Seacrest	Yes	Evan Rachel Wood, Luke Grimes	No
November 7	Kelly Ripa & Ryan Seacrest	Yes	LIVE's Virtual Road Trip – Atlanta, Georgia: Laverne Cox, Sara Gilbert, Chef Kelli Farrell	No
November 8	Kelly Ripa & Ryan Seacrest	Yes	LIVE's Virtual Road Trip – Tampa, Florida: Constance Zimmer, Chef Andrea Gonzmart Williams	Yes
November 9	Kelly Ripa & Ryan Seacrest	Yes	LIVE's Virtual Road Trip – Cleveland, Ohio: Sylvester Stallone, Judd Hirsch, Chef Michael Symon	No
November 10	Kelly Ripa & Ryan Seacrest	Yes	LIVE's Virtual Road Trip – San Francisco, California: Caroline Rhea, Gaten Matarazzo, Back 2 Back Bargains, Chef Francis Ang	No
November 11	Kelly Ripa & Ryan Seacrest	Yes	LIVE's Virtual Road Trip – Dallas, Texas: Justin Hartley, Lindsay Lohan, Back 2 Back Bargains, Chef Dean Fearing	No
November 14	Kelly Ripa & Ryan Seacrest	Yes	Linda Cardellini, Louis Tomlinson, Soleil Moon Frye	No
November 15	Kelly Ripa & Ryan Seacrest	Yes	Anya Taylor-Joy, Freddie Highmore	Yes
November 16	Kelly Ripa & Ryan Seacrest	Yes	Jessica Chastain, Shangela	Yes
November 17	Kelly Ripa & Ryan Seacrest	Yes	Chris Hemsworth, Fitz and the Tantrums	Yes
November 18	Kelly Ripa & Ryan Seacrest	Yes	Michelle Williams, Tituss Burgess, Thanksgiving Entertaining Tips, LIVE's @ Home Thanksgiving – Déjà Vu	No
November 21	Kelly Ripa & Déjà Vu	Yes	David Duchovny, Brian Tyree Henry	Yes
November 22	Kelly Ripa & Déjà Vu	Yes	Jake Gyllenhaal; Charli D'Amelio & Mark Ballas, LIVE's @ Home Thanksgiving – Kelly & Mark	No
November 23	Kelly Ripa & Déjà Vu	Yes	Gabrielle Union; Gabby Windey & Val Chmerkovskiy, LIVE's @ Home Thanksgiving – Gelman	No
November 28	Kelly Ripa & Ryan Seacrest	Yes	Zoe Saldaña, David Harbour, LIVE's Holiday Gift Bargains Week – Affordable Tech Gifts	No
November 29	Kelly Ripa & Ryan Seacrest	Yes	Paul Dano, Sigourney Weaver, LIVE's Holiday Gift Bargains Week – Luxury Gifts for Less	Yes
November 30	Kelly Ripa & Ryan Seacrest	Yes	Jim Parsons, Sam Worthington, LIVE's Holiday Gift Bargains Week – Family Fun Gifts	Yes

=== December 2022 ===
Date	Co-hosts	"Host chat"	Guests / segments	"Kelly and Ryan's Inbox"
December 1	Kelly Ripa & Ryan Seacrest	Yes	Common, LIVE's Holiday Gift Bargains Week – Gifts for the Home	Yes
December 2	Kelly Ripa & Ryan Seacrest	Yes	Carson Kressley, LIVE's Holiday Gift Bargains Week – Gifts for the Traveler	Yes
December 5	Kelly Ripa & Ryan Seacrest	Yes	Claire Foy, Gabourey Sidibe	Yes
December 6	Kelly Ripa & Josh Groban	Yes	Sebastian Maniscalco, Janelle James	No
December 7	Kelly Ripa & Ryan Seacrest	Yes	Emma Thompson, Zoey Deutch	No
December 8	Kelly Ripa & Ryan Seacrest	Yes	Catherine Zeta-Jones, Matthew Macfadyen	No
December 9	Kelly Ripa & Ryan Seacrest	Yes	H. E. R., Sadie Sink, Holiday Toys	No
December 12	Kelly Ripa & Mark Consuelos	Yes	Edward Norton, Naomi Ackie, LIVE's Holiday Bake it Easy Week – Chef Millie Peartree	Yes
December 13	Kelly Ripa & Mark Consuelos	Yes	Antonio Banderas, Ashanti, LIVE's Holiday Bake it Easy Week – Shannen Doherty	Yes
December 14	Kelly Ripa & Mark Consuelos	Yes	Kate Hudson, Holly Robinson Peete, LIVE's Holiday Bake it Easy Week – Tieghan Gerard	No
December 15	Kelly Ripa & Mark Consuelos	Yes	Salma Hayek Pinault, RuPaul, Andrea Bocelli & Family, LIVE's Holiday Bake it Easy Week – Chef Eden Grinshpan	No
December 16	Kelly Ripa & Ryan Seacrest	Yes	LIVE's Holiday Sweater Party: Harry Connick, Jr., Maria Menounos, American Authors	No
December 19	Kelly Ripa & Ryan Seacrest	Yes	LIVE's Home for the Holidays Special: David Foster & Katharine McPhee, Radio City Rockettes, Steve Patterson, Sing Harlem, Santa	No
December 26	Kelly Ripa & Ryan Seacrest	Yes	Luke Evans, Naveen Andrews, O. A. R.	Yes

=== January 2023 ===
Date	Co-hosts	"Host chat"	Guests / segments	"Kelly and Ryan's Inbox"
January 2	Kelly Ripa & Déjà Vu	Yes	Annaleigh Ashford, Colin Quinn, How to Keep Your New Year's Resolutions	Yes
January 3	Kelly Ripa & Ryan Seacrest	Yes	Ana Gasteyer, Scott Caan, LIVE's Best Me in '23 – Managing Post-Holiday Blues	No
January 4	Kelly Ripa & Ryan Seacrest	Yes	Winston Duke, Carson Kressley, LIVE's Best Me in '23 – Anxiety and Stress Relievers	Yes
January 5	Ryan Seacrest & Déjà Vu	Yes	Allison Williams, LIVE's Best Me in '23 – Strategies to Decompress	Yes
January 6	Ryan Seacrest & Déjà Vu	Yes	Lacey Chabert, LIVE's Best Me in '23 – Alternative Treatments for Depression	Yes
January 9	Kelly Ripa & Ryan Seacrest	Yes	Malcolm-Jamal Warner, Theo James, LIVE's Best Me in '23 – Bodyweight Exercise	No
January 10	Kelly Ripa & Ryan Seacrest	Yes	Jane Krakowski, Jeremy Sisto, LIVE's Best Me in '23 – Resistance Band Workout	No
January 11	Ryan Seacrest & Carson Kressley	Yes	Gerard Butler, LIVE's Best Me in '23 – Pain Prevention	Yes
January 12	Ryan Seacrest & Déjà Vu	Yes	Rosie Perez, Feel Better Bargains, LIVE's Best Me in '23 – Yoga	Yes
January 13	Ryan Seacrest & Jenny Mollen	Yes	Morris Chestnut, LIVE's Best Me in '23 – HIIT Workout	Yes
January 16	Kelly Ripa & Ryan Seacrest	Yes	Nathan Fillion, Heidi Gardner, Alvin Ailey Dance Theater Performance, LIVE's Best Me in '23 – Brain Foods	Yes
January 17	Kelly Ripa & Ryan Seacrest	Yes	Kristin Chenoweth, Harry Hamlin, LIVE's Best Me in '23 – Heart Healthy Foods	Yes
January 18	Kelly Ripa & Ryan Seacrest	Yes	David Muir, Mel B, LIVE's Best Me in '23 – Healing Foods	No
January 19	Kelly Ripa & Ryan Seacrest	Yes	Emma Roberts, Brad Goreski, LIVE's Best Me in '23 – Simple Strategies to Boost Nutrition	No
January 20	Kelly Ripa & Ryan Seacrest	Yes	LIVE's Viewer's Choice Show 2022	No
January 23	Kelly Ripa & Ryan Seacrest	Yes	Sarah Michelle Gellar, Zach Shallcross, LIVE's Best Me in '23 – Easy Ways to Save for Retirement	Yes
January 24	Kelly Ripa & Ryan Seacrest	Yes	Josh Duhamel, Brianne Howey, LIVE's Best Me in '23 – Investing and Budgeting	Yes
January 25	Kelly Ripa & Ryan Seacrest	Yes	Nia Long, Chase Elliott, Linsey Davis, LIVE's Best Me in '23 – Repairing Bad Credit and Getting Out of Debt	Yes
January 26	Kelly Ripa & Ryan Seacrest	Yes	Hilary Duff, LIVE's Best Me in '23 – Building True Wealth	Yes
January 27	Kelly Ripa & Ryan Seacrest	Yes	Rachel Bilson, LIVE's Best Me in '23 – Mini Money Makeover	Yes
January 30	Kelly Ripa & Mark Consuelos	Yes	Dave Bautista, LIVE's Travel & Me in '23 – Traveling with Your Family	Yes
January 31	Kelly Ripa & Ryan Seacrest	Yes	Kal Penn, LIVE's Travel & Me in '23 – Vacation Planning Tips	Yes

=== February 2023 ===
Date	Co-hosts	"Host Chat"	Guests/Segments	"Kelly and Ryan's Inbox"
February 1	Kelly Ripa & Ryan Seacrest	Yes	Alan Cumming, Antonia Gentry, LIVE's Travel & Me in '23 – Debunking Travel Myths	No
February 2	Kelly Ripa & Déjà Vu	Yes	Skylar Astin, LIVE's Travel & Me in '23 – Hidden Travel Gems	Yes
February 3	Kelly Ripa & Ryan Seacrest	Yes	Harrison Ford, Wendell Pierce, LIVE's Travel & Me in '23 – Packing for Travel	No
February 6	Kelly Ripa & Ryan Seacrest	Yes	Ashton Kutcher, Beth Behrs	Yes
February 7	Kelly Ripa & Ryan Seacrest	Yes	Maria Menounos, Diego Boneta	Yes
February 8	Kelly Ripa & Ryan Seacrest	Yes	Penn Badgley, DIY Game Day Party Tips	No
February 9	Kelly Ripa & Ryan Seacrest	Yes	Jordan Fisher, Back 2 Back Bargains, National Pizza Day	No
February 10	Kelly Ripa & Ryan Seacrest	Yes	Maude Apatow, Back 2 Back Bargains, Relieving & Repairing Back Pain	Yes
February 13	Kelly Ripa & Mark Consuelos	Yes	Rita Ora, The Love Games, LIVE's Love Week – Last-Minute Valentine Ideas	Yes
February 14	Kelly Ripa & Ryan Seacrest	Yes	LIVE's Love Show: Love Look Back, Jenny Mollen & Jason Biggs, The Love Games, Lovin' Luv Memories	Yes
February 15	Kelly Ripa & Ryan Seacrest	Yes	Kelsey Grammer, The Love Games, LIVE's Love Week	Yes
February 16	Kelly Ripa & Ryan Seacrest	Yes	Camryn Manheim, Elizabeth Debicki, The Love Games, LIVE's Love Week	Yes
February 17	Kelly Ripa & Ryan Seacrest	Yes	Milo Ventimiglia, Mark Consuelos, The Love Games, LIVE's Love Week	Yes
February 20	Kelly Ripa & Ryan Seacrest	Yes	Benjamin Bratt, Madelyn Cline, Behind the Scenes of American Idol, Winner Winner Winter Dinner Week – Chef Maria Loi	No
February 21	Kelly Ripa & Ryan Seacrest	Yes	Eugene Levy, Jonathan Majors, Winner Winner Winter Dinner Week – Guy Fieri	No
February 22	Kelly Ripa & Ryan Seacrest	Yes	Taye Diggs, Daymond John, Winner Winner Winter Dinner Week – Alex Guarnaschelli	No
February 23	Kelly Ripa & Ryan Seacrest	Yes	Whitney Cummings, Winner Winner Winter Dinner Week – Chef Eitan Bernath	Yes
February 24	Kelly Ripa & Ryan Seacrest	Yes	Tessa Thompson, Winner Winner Winter Dinner Week – Chef Jocelyn Delk Adams	Yes
February 27	Kelly Ripa & Ryan Seacrest	Yes	Riley Keough, Cristo Fernández	Yes
February 28	Kelly Ripa & Ryan Seacrest	Yes	Marlon Wayans, Jordan Davis	Yes

=== March 2023 ===
Date	Co-hosts	"Host Chat"	Guests/Segments	"Kelly and Ryan's Inbox"
March 1	Kelly Ripa & Ryan Seacrest	Yes	Michelle Yeoh, National Peanut Butter Lovers' Day	Yes
March 2	Kelly Ripa & Ryan Seacrest	Yes	Willem Dafoe, Lea Michele, National Old Stuff Day	No
March 3	Kelly Ripa & Ryan Seacrest	Yes	Woody Harrelson, Jennifer Nettles, National Unplugging Day	Yes
March 6	Kelly Ripa & Ryan Seacrest	Yes	Katie Holmes, Tips for Movie Night at Home, LIVE's Oscar Countdown Games	Yes
March 7	Kelly Ripa & Ryan Seacrest	Yes	Margo Martindale, Sarah Ferguson, LIVE's Oscar Countdown Games	Yes
March 8	Kelly Ripa & Ryan Seacrest	Yes	Idris Elba, Padma Lakshmi, LIVE's Oscar Countdown Games	No
March 9	Kelly Ripa & Ryan Seacrest	Yes	Courteney Cox, Adam Brody, LIVE's Oscar Countdown Games	No
March 10	Kelly Ripa & Ryan Seacrest	Yes	LIVE's Pre-Oscar Celebration: F. Murray Abraham, Oscar Memories and Flashbacks, Know Your Oscars, LIVE's Oscar Countdown Games	No
March 13	Kelly Ripa & Ryan Seacrest	Yes	LIVE's After Oscar Show: Ke Huy Quan & Jamie Lee Curtis, Jimmy Kimmel, Jason Mraz, Carson Kressley, Elaine Welteroth	No
March 14	Kelly Ripa & Ryan Seacrest	Yes	Christina Ricci, LIVE's Sleep Week – Adjusting to Daylight Saving Time	Yes
March 15	Kelly Ripa & Ryan Seacrest	Yes	Keira Knightley, Nicholas Braun, LIVE's Sleep Week – Tips to Help Kids Fall Asleep	No
March 16	Kelly Ripa & Ryan Seacrest	Yes	Bob Odenkirk, Carrie Coon, LIVE's Sleep Week – Sleep Questions from Viewers	No
March 17	Kelly Ripa & Ryan Seacrest	Yes	Hannah Waddingham, Melanie Lynskey, LIVE's Sleep Week – Food & Drinks That Disrupt Sleep	No
March 20	Kelly Ripa & Ryan Seacrest	Yes	Keanu Reeves, Regé-Jean Page, Spring Bargains	No
March 21	Kelly Ripa & Ryan Seacrest	Yes	Zach Braff, Finola Hughes, The New Menudo	No
March 22	Kelly Ripa & Ryan Seacrest	Yes	Jennifer Aniston, Mae Whitman	Yes
March 23	Kelly Ripa & Ryan Seacrest	Yes	Kiefer Sutherland, Dove Cameron	Yes
March 24	Kelly Ripa & Ryan Seacrest	Yes	Toni Collette, Brian Cox	Yes
March 27	Ryan Seacrest & Lionel Richie	Yes	Dennis Quaid, Lauren Ambrose, LIVE's Spring Has Sprung Week – Spring Gardening Tips	Yes
March 28	Ryan Seacrest & Ali Wentworth	Yes	Luke Bryan, Katy Perry & Lionel Richie, LIVE's Spring Has Sprung Week – Spring Cleaning Your Kitchen	Yes
March 29	Ryan Seacrest & Ali Wentworth	Yes	Zach Shallcross & Kaity Biggar, Jabari Banks, LIVE's Spring Has Sprung Week – Spring Cleaning Your Tech	No
March 30	Ryan Seacrest & Katie Lowes	Yes	Kyra Sedgwick, Harry Shum, Jr., LIVE's Spring Has Sprung Week – Spring Allergy Tips	Yes
March 31	Ryan Seacrest & Katie Lowes	Yes	Taron Egerton, Heather Graham, LIVE's Spring Has Sprung Week – Spring Crafts	Yes

=== April 2023 ===
Date	Co-hosts	"Host Chat"	Guests/Segments	"Kelly and Ryan's Inbox"
April 3	Ryan Seacrest & Jenny Mollen	Yes	Lorraine Bracco, Jeremy Jordan, Freezer Foods 101	Yes
April 10	Kelly Ripa & Ryan Seacrest	Yes	Janelle James, Reid Scott, LIVE's Favorite Food Farewell Week – Chef Maria Loi	No
April 11	Kelly Ripa & Ryan Seacrest	Yes	Jennifer Garner, Jesse Metcalfe, LIVE's Favorite Food Farewell Week – Chef Eric Ripert	Yes
April 12	Kelly Ripa & Ryan Seacrest	Yes	Chrissy Metz, Derek Luke, LIVE's Favorite Food Farewell Week – Chef Michael Symon	No
April 13	Kelly Ripa & Ryan Seacrest	Yes	Rachel Brosnahan, LIVE's Favorite Food Farewell Week – In-Studio Pizza Tour	Yes
April 14	Kelly Ripa & Ryan Seacrest	Yes	Ryan's Last Show: Dr. Jill Biden, Ryan Moments & Memories	No
