= 2024 United States presidential debates =

Part of the 2024 U.S. presidential election

- First 2024 United States presidential debate
- June 27, 2024

Nominee	Joe Biden (then-presumptive)	Donald Trump (then-presumptive)
Party	Democratic	Republican
Home state	Delaware	Florida
- Second 2024 United States presidential debate
- September 10, 2024 (Note: The Biden and Trump campaigns both agreed to a September 10 debate prior to Biden's withdrawing from the race.)

Nominee	Kamala Harris (Note: Joe Biden ultimately withdrew from the race on July 21 and immediately endorsed Kamala Harris, who became the Democratic presidential nominee afterwards.)	Donald Trump
Party	Democratic	Republican
Home state	California	Florida
- 2024 United States vice presidential debate
- October 1, 2024
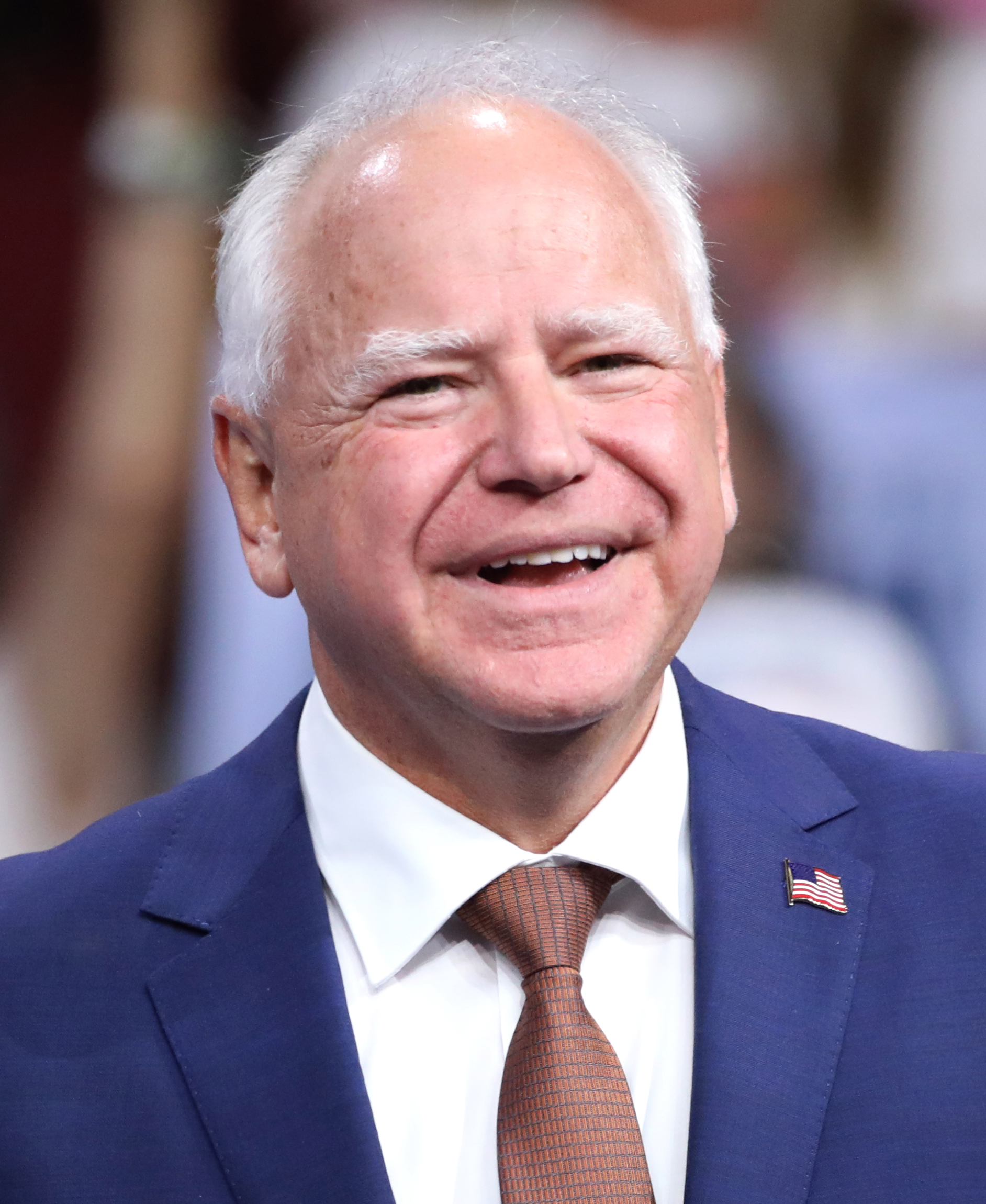

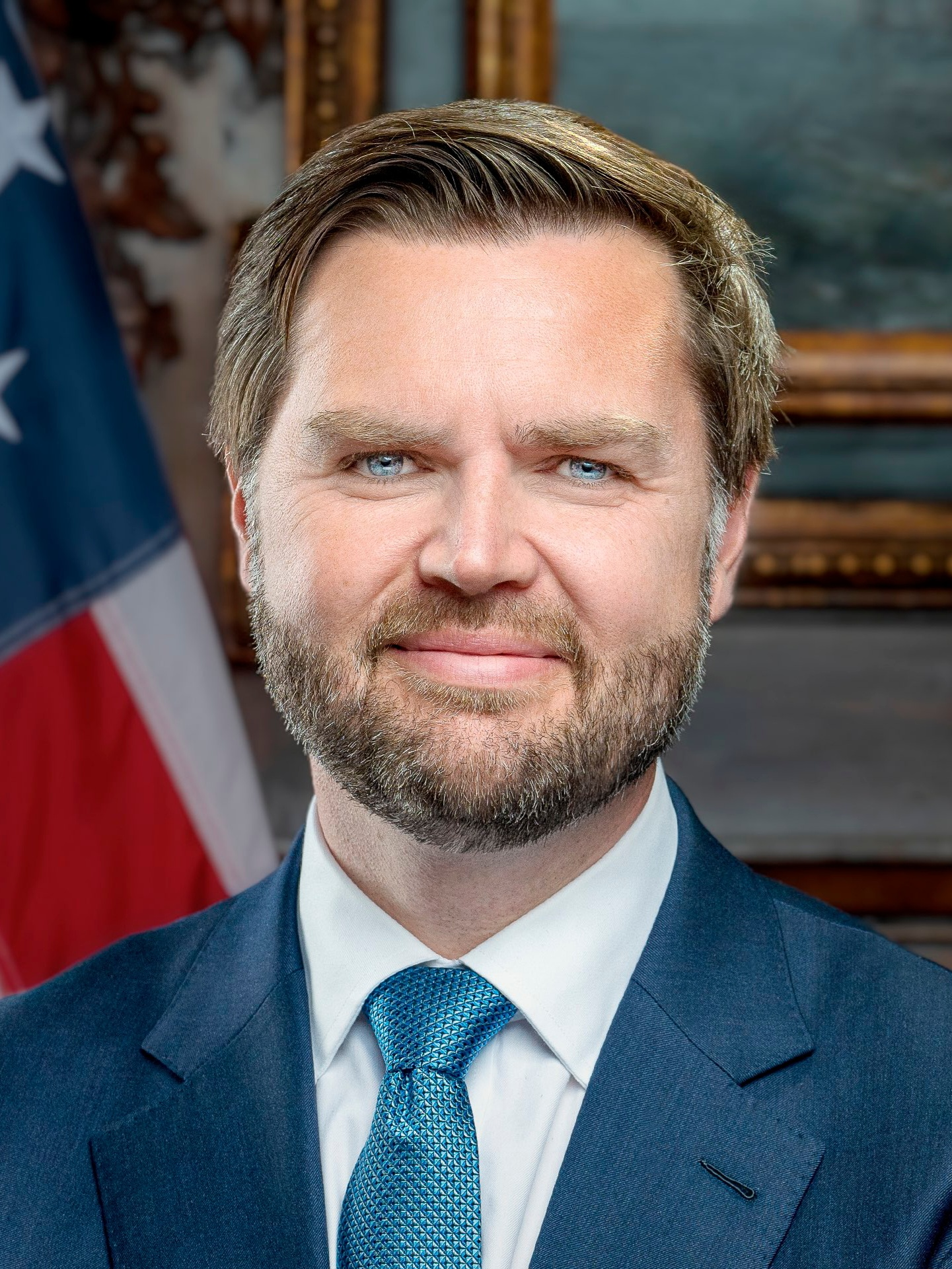
Nominee	Tim Walz	JD Vance
Party	Democratic	Republican
Home state	Minnesota	Ohio

Two presidential debates for major candidates in the general election were held in connection with the 2024 presidential election. The first general election debate between the major candidates was sponsored by CNN and attended by then-presumptive Democratic nominee Joe Biden and then-presumptive Republican nominee Donald Trump on June 27, 2024. Biden was widely considered to have performed poorly during the first debate, with many commentators and Democrats calling for him to drop out of the race. He ultimately withdrew from the race on July 21. A second debate, sponsored by ABC, was held on September 10, 2024 between Trump and Democratic nominee Kamala Harris. A vice presidential debate between Trump's running mate JD Vance and Harris's running mate Tim Walz was held on October 1, hosted by CBS.

== Background ==
=== Commission on Presidential Debates ===
In April 2022, the Republican National Committee (RNC) voted unanimously to withdraw from the Commission on Presidential Debates (CPD); committee chair Ronna McDaniel called the organization "biased" and stated that they would find "newer, better debate platforms" for future Republican nominees. This announcement came after years of tension between the organizations, including a threat made earlier in the year by the RNC to change its rules to prohibit nominees from participating in CPD debates. In response, the commission stated that "[its] plans for 2024 will be based on fairness, neutrality and a firm commitment to help the American public learn about the candidates and the issues".

Former president Donald Trump, the frontrunner for the Republican nomination, did not attend any primary debates, describing them as unnecessary to his campaign and claiming unfair treatment by organizers. The DNC did not support hosting any official primary debates, and Biden did not participate in the 2024 Democratic Party presidential debates and forums unsanctioned by the DNC. Trump has previously accused the CPD of unfair treatment in the 2016 and 2020 debates. Despite this, Trump told Fox News host Bret Baier in a June 2023 interview that he was interested in debating incumbent president Joe Biden should he become the Democratic nominee. At that time, Biden had not committed to attending the debate either, as his campaign was also in conflict with the commission for failing to enforce its rules against Trump, though in April 2024 he confirmed he planned to debate Trump.

Biden and Trump became the presumptive nominees of their respective parties in March 2024, setting up the first presidential rematch since 1956. On April 14, 2024, a number of major news organizations signed an open letter to the presumptive nominees urging them to attend the debates, arguing for its "rich tradition in our American democracy" and that the "exceptionally high" stakes require debates to be held. Signatories include ABC News, CBS News, CNN, NBC News, and Fox News, among others.

Chris LaCivita and Susie Wiles, campaign managers for Trump, pushed the CPD to hold more debates and to hold them earlier than the planned September date; the commission refused to accede. Throughout his 2024 campaign, Trump confirmed his intention to cooperate with the CPD repeatedly and challenged Biden to debate "anywhere, anytime, anyplace".

The CPD announced the schedule for its four debates on November 20, 2023. All debates would have started at 9 p.m. ET and would have run for 90 minutes uninterrupted. In order to qualify for the CPD-sponsored debates, presidential candidates would have needed to meet the following criteria: (vice presidential candidates would have qualified by being the running mate of a qualifying presidential candidate)

- Be constitutionally eligible to hold the presidency.
- Appear on a sufficient number of ballots to have a mathematical possibility of winning a majority vote in the Electoral College.
- Have a level of support of at least 15% of the national electorate as determined by five national public opinion polling organizations selected by the commission, using the average of those organizations' most recently reported results at the time of determination.

On June 24, 2024, the CPD announced that it was releasing the sites it had selected for its 2024 debates from their contracts, adding that "CPD stands ready to sponsor 2024 debates should circumstances change."

Both Biden and Trump opposed the CPD's debate format and schedule.

=== Potential Biden–Trump debates ===
On May 15, 2024, the Biden campaign announced that it would not participate in the CPD-hosted debates and instead invited Trump to participate in two alternative debates to take place in June and September, each hosted in a TV news studio without an audience. Jen O'Malley Dillon, the Biden campaign manager, laid out three reasons for sidelining the CPD, indicating that the debates were not completed until early voting started, that the debates had become "a spectacle" and that the CPD could not "enforce its own rules". Frank Fahrenkopf, the head of the CPD, pushed back against the claims in an interview with Politico, indicating that the September 16 debate date was the best date, as the "key date" to secure ballot access for independents is September 6. Fahrenkopf also noted that the general election debates are "not like the primary debates" and that Trump himself had not followed the debate rules during the 2020 general election debate moderated by Chris Wallace. Biden and Trump accepted an offer from CNN to hold the first of these debates on June 27 and from ABC to hold the second on September 10.

Trump indicated the same day that he had accepted a Fox News debate to be hosted on October 2, 2024, though the Biden campaign dismissed the prospect of a third debate. Robert F. Kennedy Jr. accused the two candidates of colluding to exclude him from televised debates "because they are afraid I would win"; both CNN and ABC had decided on eligibility criteria that were similar to those that had been used by the CPD, with Kennedy not appearing on a sufficient number of state ballots at that time. The Biden campaign had unsuccessfully proposed that third-party candidates be excluded from the debates. A May poll taken by the Harvard University Center for American Political Studies/Harris indicated that 71% of the people surveyed were in favor of allowing a third-party candidate to debate. Kennedy's campaign filed a complaint with the Federal Election Commission, maintaining that neither Biden nor Trump meet the ballot access threshold as they have not been nominated by their parties.

Trump announced on May 17 that he would be willing to hold another debate with Biden that would be hosted by NBC News and Telemundo.

On July 9, Trump challenged Biden to a debate with no moderators that would be done that week, as well as an 18-hole golf match.

== Republican primary debates ==
Five candidates' debates took place during the campaign for the Republican Party's nomination for president of the United States in 2024.

== General election debate list ==
2024 United States presidential election debates
No.	Date and time	Host	Location	Moderators	Participants		
Key: P Participant I Invitee A Absent W Withdrawn N/A Not Applicable					Democratic	Democratic	Republican
Key: P Participant I Invitee A Absent W Withdrawn N/A Not Applicable					President Joe Biden from Delaware	Vice President Kamala Harris from California	President Donald Trump from Florida
1	Thursday, June 27, 2024; 9:00 p.m. EDT	CNN	Atlanta, Georgia	Jake Tapper, Dana Bash	P	N/A	P
2	Tuesday, September 10, 2024; 9:00 p.m. EDT	ABC	Philadelphia, Pennsylvania	David Muir, Linsey Davis	W	P	P
–	~~Monday, September 16, 2024~~; ~~9:00 p.m.–10:30 p.m. EDT~~	~~Texas State University~~	~~San Marcos, Texas~~	Canceled			
–	~~Tuesday, October 1, 2024~~; ~~9:00 p.m.–10:30 p.m. EDT~~	~~Virginia State University~~	~~Petersburg, Virginia~~	Canceled			
–	~~Wednesday, October 9, 2024~~; ~~9:00 p.m.–10:30 p.m. EDT~~	~~University of Utah~~	~~Salt Lake City, Utah~~	Canceled			

2024 United States vice presidential election debate
No.	Date and time	Host	Location	Moderator	Participants		
Key: P Participant I InviteeA Absent N/A Not Applicable					Democratic	Democratic	Republican
Key: P Participant I InviteeA Absent N/A Not Applicable					Vice President Kamala Harris from California	Governor Tim Walz of Minnesota	Senator JD Vance from Ohio
–	~~Wednesday, September 25, 2024~~; ~~9:00 p.m.–10:30 p.m. EDT~~	~~Lafayette College~~	~~Easton, Pennsylvania~~	Canceled			
VP	Tuesday, October 1, 2024; 9:00 p.m. EDT	CBS	Manhattan, New York City, New York	Margaret Brennan, Norah O'Donnell	N/A	P	P

== June 27: First presidential debate (CNN, Atlanta) ==
The first presidential debate of the 2024 general election was held on Thursday, June 27, 2024, when Joe Biden debated Donald Trump.

American writer and political consultant Tim Miller called Biden's performance the "worst performance in the history of televised presidential debates", a sentiment also shared by Jeff Greenfield of Politico and NewsNation chief political analyst Chris Stirewalt. Journalist Jake Sherman reported that several congressional Democrats thought that Biden "didn't even clear the lowest bar", and that Biden was not even able to articulate what his policies are even if they agreed on them. Some Democrats were unsure whether he should continue his campaign and be the Democratic nominee. CNN's chief national correspondent John King reported that there was "a deep, a wide, and a very aggressive panic" in the Democratic Party that started a few minutes into the debate. During the debate, unnamed elected officials, party strategists, and fundraisers were reported to have discussed replacing Biden as the party's candidate due to fears about him potentially hurting other Democrats' public perceptions, and deciding if prominent Democrats should make a public statement about asking Biden to step down.

=== Democratic Party response ===
"I know I'm not a young man, to state the obvious. I don't walk as easily as I used to. I don't talk as smoothly as I used to. I don't debate as well as I used to, but I know what I do know: I know how to tell the truth. I know right from wrong. And I know how to do this job, I know how to get things done. And I know what millions of Americans know: When you get knocked down, you get back up."

— Joe Biden, responding to criticism of his debate performance during a speech in North Carolina the following day (June 28, 2024).

President Biden stated to reporters at a Waffle House after the debate: "I think we did well" and said he did not have any concerns about his performance or calls for him to drop out of the presidential race, stating that it was difficult to debate "a liar." Biden was congratulated by his wife, First Lady Jill Biden, on his performance at a post-debate gathering. She told him on stage that he did "such a great job. You answered every question." On May 27, 2026, Jill would go on to say that she thought Joe was having a stroke during the debate as "[She] had never ever seen Joe like that before or since." Biden's running mate, Vice President Kamala Harris, claimed that while Biden "started off slow", he still managed to have a strong finish. Biden-Harris 2024 campaign manager Jen O'Malley Dillon praised Biden's debate performance, saying that he presented a "positive and winning vision" for the future.

=== Calls for President Biden to drop out ===
On December 23, 2023, Democratic U.S. Congressman Dean Phillips of Minnesota argued while campaigning for the Democratic nomination for president that Biden should "thoughtfully exit" the 2024 presidential race. Democrats such as Julian Castro and Phillips had hurt their careers for publicly saying that Biden was too old before the debate, but immediately following the debate, some in the party began calling for President Biden to drop out of the presidential race. Democratic strategist James Carville and former 2020 Democratic presidential primary candidate Andrew Yang were among the first to make those calls. On July 2, 2024, U.S. Congressman Lloyd Doggett of Texas became the first Democrat in Congress to publicly call for Biden to step aside as the party's nominee after the debate. He was joined by various Congressmembers in the following days. On July 7, four more House Democrats called for Biden to exit the race during a private call, including Adam Smith, Jerry Nadler, Mark Takano, and Joe Morelle. Smith went on the record the following day and called for Biden to withdraw.

Biden stated in an ABC News interview with George Stephanopoulos on July 5 that he would not end his candidacy. The president again refused to drop out on July 8. That day Biden appeared on Morning Joe on MSNBC by telephone, advising the "elites in the party" against his nomination to "run against me. Announce for president. Challenge me at the convention". He sent a letter to Congressional Democrats before Morning Joe explaining his decision, stating that "The question of how to move forward has been well-aired for over a week now. And it's time for it to end". In an attempt to show voters and Democratic politicians that he was capable of facing Donald Trump in the 2024 election, he held a solo press conference on July 11, 2024, following the NATO 2024 Washington summit.

Biden suspended his re-election campaign on July 21, 2024, and endorsed Vice President Kamala Harris.

On August 3, the Minnesota Star Tribune reported that 2024 Democratic presidential primary challenger Representative Dean Phillips said, “If people write anything, I just hope that they might write if [Biden] had debated me then and he had been on one stage, unscripted, with a national audience, and he demonstrated that decline then, this would have been very different circumstances.” He continued, “And that’s what I was trying to do.”

== September 10: Second presidential debate (ABC, Philadelphia) ==
Second presidential debate
- Date(s): September 10, 2024
- Duration: 100 minutes
- Venue: National Constitution Center
- Location: Philadelphia, Pennsylvania
- Participants: Kamala Harris; Donald Trump
- Footage: C-SPAN on YouTube
- Moderator(s): David Muir and Linsey Davis of ABC News
- Transcript: Transcript on ABC
- Fact checking: Fact checking

The second presidential debate was held on Tuesday, September 10, 2024, at 9:00 p.m. EDT at the National Constitution Center in Philadelphia, Pennsylvania.

=== Prelude ===
The Biden and Trump campaigns had agreed to a September 10 debate hosted by ABC, but after Biden suspended his re-election campaign, it became unclear whether Trump would debate a new rival candidate. In late July, after Harris secured enough support to become the presumptive nominee, Trump said he would debate her repeatedly, though he said he preferred not to do so on ABC.

Fox News extended invitations to Harris and Trump for a proposed debate to place on September 17 in Pennsylvania. Harris indicated on July 25 she was willing to debate Trump on ABC. Trump's communications director, Steven Cheung, remarked the same day that the Trump campaign would not commit to any debate until the Democratic Party formally nominated its candidate. On August 2, Trump stated that the planned September 10 debate would be "terminated" since Biden would no longer be a participant and instead he had "agreed with Fox News" to a September 4 debate with a live audience, which Harris never accepted. In an August 8 press conference, Trump announced he would rejoin the September 10 debate, though he made it contingent on Harris agreeing to two other proposed debates, stating that if Harris only agrees to the ABC debate, "I don't know how that's gonna work out. We'd like to do three debates."

Harris and Trump verbally sparred over attending the debates. On August 15, the Harris campaign said a second debate would be contingent on Trump "actually showing up" to the September 10 debate. On August 27, Trump recommitted to the September 10 debate.

==== Qualifications ====
In order to qualify for the September 10 ABC debate, presidential candidates needed to meet the following criteria:

- Be constitutionally eligible to hold the presidency
- File with the Federal Election Commission
- Appear on a sufficient number of ballots to have a mathematical possibility of winning a majority vote in the Electoral College
- Agree to the rules of the debate
- Have a level of support of at least 15% in four national public polls of registered or likely voters selected by ABC, with such polls dating between August 1 and September 3, 2024.

Harris and Trump were invited to the debate in early August.

Five polls met ABC's criteria for inclusion, with Harris and Trump meeting the 15% threshold in every poll. Kennedy peaked at 6% in a Fox News poll. West, Stein, and Oliver all peaked at 1% support, and no other candidate was tested.

Qualified candidates for the second debate
Candidate	Meets polling criterion	Meets EV criteria	Meets both criteria/ invited	Refs
Harris	Yes; 5 qualifying polls	Yes; 538 EVs	Yes	
Trump	Yes; 5 qualifying polls	Yes; 538 EVs	Yes	
Oliver	No; 0 qualifying polls	Yes; 461 EVs	No	
Stein	No; 0 qualifying polls	Yes; 396 EVs	No	
West	No; 0 qualifying polls	No; 141 EVs	No	
Kennedy	No; 0 qualifying polls	Yes; 287 EVs (Note: Kennedy also withdrew his name from the ballot in 11 states totaling 171 additional electoral votes)	No	
Withdrawn candidate

==== Preparations ====
Harris prepared for the debate in Pittsburgh. Karen Dunn and Rohini Kosoglu were in charge of the preparations and Philippe Reines played Trump.

Trump prepared for the debate with a small team of advisers, including Matt Gaetz and Tulsi Gabbard.

=== Format ===
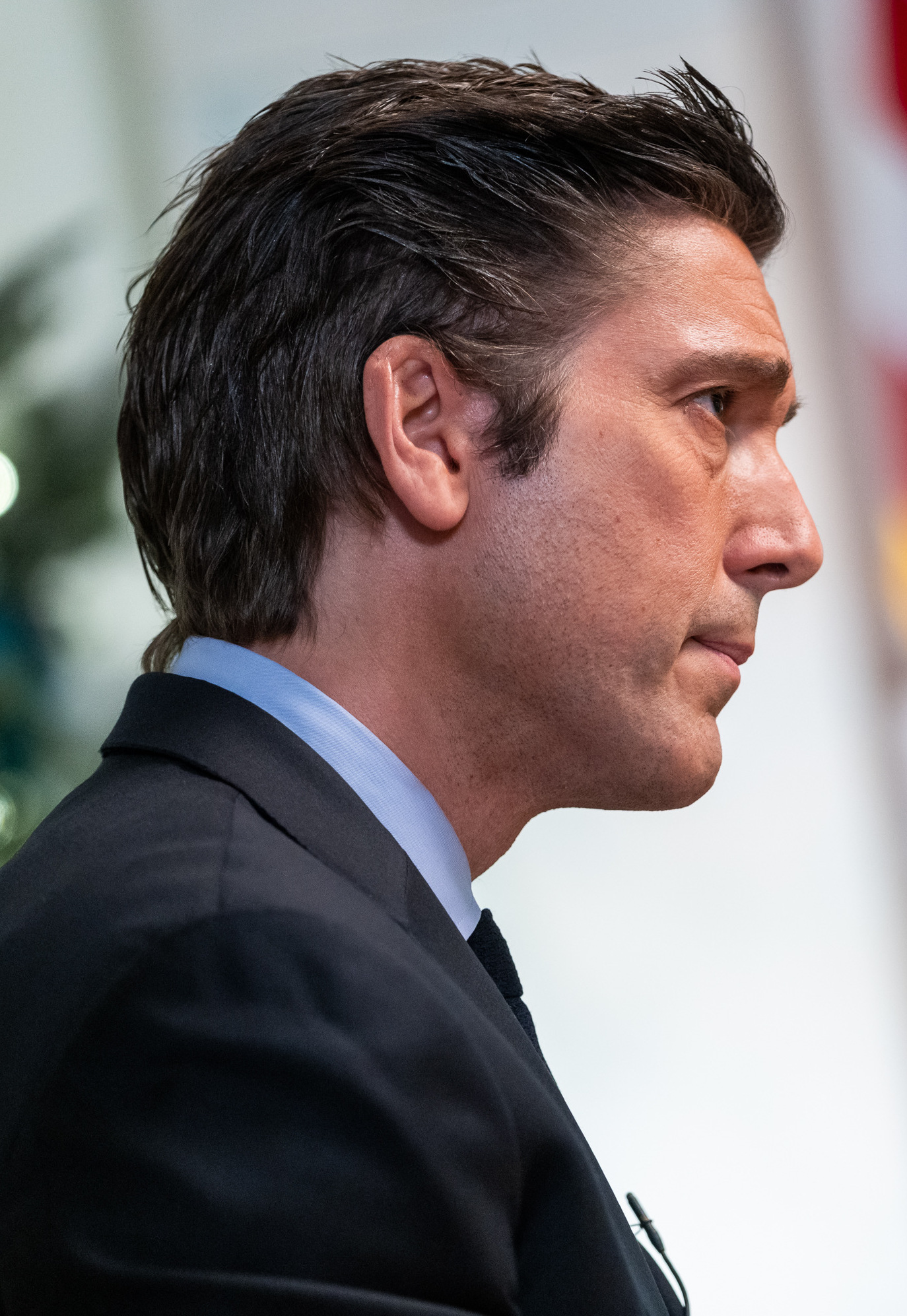
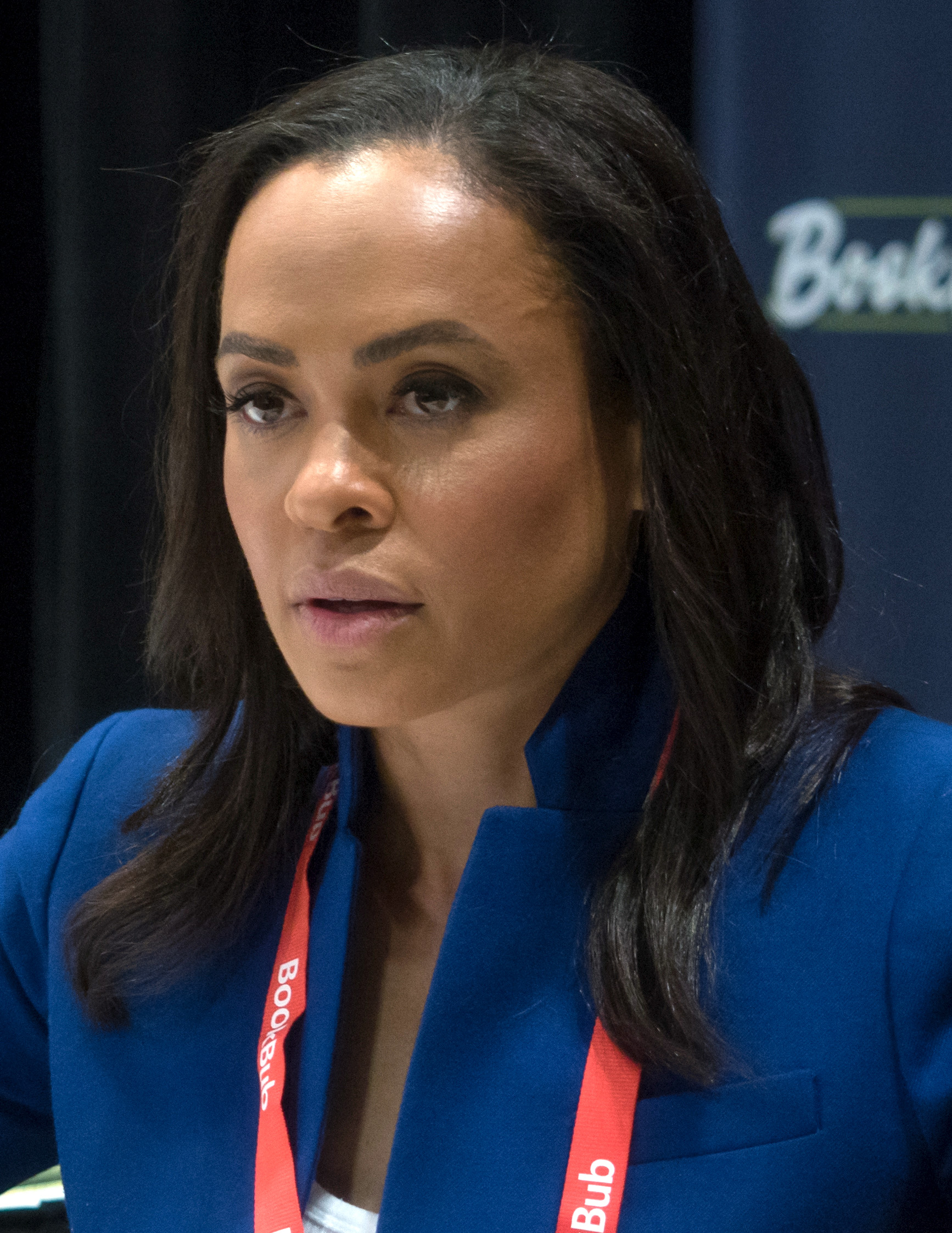
Moderators David Muir and Linsey Davis

The debate was hosted on ABC, ABC News Live, Disney+ and Hulu, and was simulcast on CNN, Fox News, MSNBC, NBC News and other networks.

The debate rules remained the same as the one prior, with no audience being present and muted microphones.

=== Debate ===
At the start of the debate, Trump moved behind his lectern, but Harris approached him and extended her hand. It was the first presidential debate to begin with a handshake in eight years.

External videos
- Pet-eating remarks during the Trump-Harris debate on September 10, 2024

In the hours leading up to the debate, social media was flooded with reports of baseless allegations—echoed by JD Vance, Trump's running mate, and Trump himself—that Haitian migrants in Springfield, Ohio, were stealing and eating cats and dogs. Despite city officials stating there were no credible reports to substantiate these claims, Trump raised the issue during the debate. He said: "In Springfield, they're eating the dogs. The people that came in, they're eating the cats. They're eating—they're eating the pets of the people that live there." He cited nothing but claimed he heard it on television. Harris laughed as Trump made those statements.

Harris accused Trump of repeatedly exploiting the issue of race to "divide the American people". The remark came after a question from the moderators about a July remark in which he said Harris "became a Black person".

Trump argued that the Biden administration had "destroyed" the country, and falsely labelled Harris a Marxist and tried to portray Harris as a "radical liberal". He claimed: "She has a plan to defund the police. She has a plan to confiscate everyone's guns." Harris responded, stating: "Tim Walz and I are both gun owners. We're not taking anybody's guns away." Trump remarked, "Remember this, she is Biden." Harris responded: "Clearly, I am not Joe Biden."

Trump attacked Harris on inflation during his statement on the economy and said "Look, we've had a terrible economy because inflation has -- which is really known as a country buster. It breaks up countries. We have inflation like very few people have ever seen before. Probably the worst in our nation's history. We were at 21%. But that's being generous because many things are 50, 60, 70, and 80% higher than they were just a few years ago." Trump also attacked Harris on immigration saying "we have millions of people pouring into our country from prisons and jails, from mental institutions and insane asylums. And they're coming in and they're taking jobs that are occupied right now by African Americans and Hispanics and also unions."

Harris invited people to attend a Trump rally and observe the crowd. "People start leaving his rallies early out of exhaustion and boredom," she said. Trump responded by saying: "People don't go to her rallies. There's no reason to go. And the people that do go, she's busing them in and paying them to be there."

Some of Harris's sharpest criticisms of Trump occurred during their clash over abortion rights, a key issue for Democrats since the US Supreme Court overturned Roe v. Wade in 2022 with Dobbs v. Jackson Women's Health Organization. Harris said: "One does not have to abandon their faith or deeply held beliefs to agree the government—and Donald Trump, certainly—should not be telling a woman what to do with her body." She said she would restore women's rights to what they were under Roe, and Trump responded that she would not have the votes necessary in Congress. Trump supported the Dobbs decision to have each state decide whether to ban abortion, but did not answer whether he would veto a hypothetical bill to ban abortion nationwide.

Trump claimed that Harris supported "defunding the police", prompting Harris to interject with "That's not true" into her muted mic. In response to this perceived interruption, Trump lashed out at Harris with the line "I'm talking now (...) Does that sound familiar?", a reference to Harris's notable "I'm speaking" line from the 2020 vice presidential debate with Mike Pence.

Trump heavily criticized the Affordable Care Act, though he claimed to have "saved" it. When asked if he had a plan of how to replace the act, Trump claimed he had "concepts of a plan". "Concepts of a plan" ended up being one of the more frequently quoted lines in the debate's aftermath.

When moderators questioned him about any regrets regarding the January 6 Capitol attack, he denied responsibility and redirected the conversation to Black Lives Matter protests. He blamed then-Speaker of the House Nancy Pelosi for not accepting his alleged offer of sending the National Guard, which the Speaker does not control. He initially used "we" when referring to the January 6 protestors and then pivoted, saying: "This group of people that has been treated so bad."

Trump was repeatedly asked if he wanted Ukraine to win its war against Russia and if it was in the best interests of the U.S. for Kyiv to achieve victory. He did not address the question directly, stating instead that he wants the war to end in order to save lives. Harris told Trump, "[Putin] would eat you for lunch" and claimed that if he had been president when Russia invaded Ukraine, "Putin would be sitting in Kyiv right now." She alleged that Trump's claim that the war would be over in 24 hours was based on the idea that he would simply concede to Putin.

==== Fact-checking ====
The moderators were tasked with fact-checking the candidates during the debate, and multiple news outlets did so as well. CNN found that Trump made over 30 false claims during the debate and Harris made only one, along with several statements "that were misleading or lacking in key context."

When Trump repeated the debunked allegation that immigrants in Springfield were eating pets, the moderator David Muir responded that there had been no credible reports of pets being harmed. Trump countered by claiming he had seen TV interviews where people said their dogs had been taken and eaten. Trump claimed that there was virtually no inflation during his presidency. However, the consumer price index rose 7.1% during his first 45 months in office. Trump claimed that some babies were being subjected to "executions" after birth. Davis intervened to fact-check him, stating: "There is no state in this country where it is legal to kill a baby after it's born." Trump also said that "A lot of these illegal immigrants coming in, [Democrats] are trying to get them to vote"; however, it is illegal for noncitizens to vote in federal elections.

Harris also made misleading and false claims during the debate, including that Trump "exchanged love letters" with North Korean dictator Kim Jong Un. Trump had only said the two leaders had fallen "in love". Harris also falsely stated that "there is not one member of the United States military who is an active duty in a combat zone," with the United States military's Central Command shortly thereafter issuing a statement that it had engaged various Houthi targets in Yemen within the past 24 hours. Harris also denied Trump's claim, that she is in support of spending taxpayers' money on gender affirmation surgeries on prison inmates, as one of his "lies." However, a video from her unsuccessful 2020 Democratic Party presidential primaries surfaced of her pledging to provide gender affirming care to detained migrants.

=== Viewership ===
Nielsen Media Research reported that 67.1 million viewers across ABC and 16 other television networks watched the debate, up from the 51.3 million viewers who watched the June 27 presidential debate between Biden and Trump; an additional seven million viewed through Disney-owned streaming platforms.

=== Reception and aftermath ===
A Voice of America video covering early reactions to the debate

Harris was declared the winner of the debate by columnists from CNN, Politico, The New York Times, USA Today, Business Insider, Vox, The Guardian, MSNBC, and the Los Angeles Times.

Debate winner
Outlet	Harris	Trump	Not sure
CNN	63%	37%	Steady
YouGov	43%	28%	30%
Reuters/Ipsos	53%	24%	24%

According to a CNN flash poll, 63% of text message respondents believed Harris won the debate, while 37% felt Trump won. A poll from YouGov showed 43% of respondents saying that Harris won, 28% saying that Trump won, and 30% unsure. A poll from Reuters and Ipsos showed 53% of respondents saying that Harris won, as opposed to 24% saying that Trump won.

According to Amy Walter, editor of the nonpartisan The Cook Political Report, Harris won the debate by successfully turning it into a referendum on Trump, while Trump did not make a consistent or compelling case against Harris.

Muir and Davis's fact-checking approach to the debate received criticism from Republicans, who alleged they fact-checked and interrupted Trump excessively while not doing the same to Harris. Trump echoed those complaints and suggested ABC News should lose its license. Other journalists and Republican pollster Frank Luntz praised their moderation.

Trump received criticism from conservative commentators and lawmakers for what was described as "taking the bait" on comments Harris made regarding crowds at his rallies. Trump's campaign strategists had urged him to emphasize in the debates that he was a "changed man" who had survived an assassination attempt and would unite America, but they believed he had been unable to do so.

Facebook satire page "America - Love It Or Leave It" posted a claim that Harris was found to have made up to 17 false claims within the first ten minutes of the debate. This was widely circulated around social media after the debate.

Many of Trump's statements during the debate, such as "They're eating the dogs ... they're eating the cats ... they're eating the pets", "execution after birth", "transgender operations on illegal aliens in prison", "Abdul ... the head of the Taliban", and "I have concepts of a plan" became viral Internet memes in its aftermath, as did Harris's facial expressions in response to Trump's statements. (Note: Attributed to multiple sources:)

At one point, while criticizing Trump over inviting the Taliban to Camp David and the deal that would eventually lead to the Afghan withdrawal, Harris referred to Trump as "this former president", pausing between "this" and "former president". In media coverage of the debate, some commentators drew attention to the pause, suggesting that Harris was avoiding using an insult or an expletive.

After the debate, polls showed Harris still had a hard time conveying the perception that she would represent a "change" in policy, due to her being a part of the Biden administration.

ABC News won a special citation for the Harris-Trump debate at the 2026 Alfred I. duPont–Columbia University Awards.

== October 1: Vice presidential debate (CBS, New York City) ==
Vice presidential debate
- Date(s): October 1, 2024
- Duration: 90 minutes
- Venue: CBS Broadcast Center Studio 45
- Location: New York City, New York
- Participants: Tim Walz; JD Vance
- Footage: USA Today on YouTube
- Moderator(s): Margaret Brennan and Norah O'Donnell of CBS

The vice presidential debate was held on Tuesday, October 1, 2024, at 9:00 p.m. EDT at the CBS Broadcast Center in New York City.

=== Prelude ===
After Biden's withdrawal on July 21, 2024, doubt was cast over the vice presidential debate, as Harris began her own campaign for the presidency. Republican vice presidential candidate JD Vance initially expressed annoyance at losing the opportunity to debate Harris, but showed interest in debating Democratic vice presidential nominee Tim Walz. The day after he was selected as the Democratic vice presidential nominee, Walz spoke in favor of debating Vance.

On August 14, CBS offered four dates for a vice presidential debate: September 17 and 24 and October 1 and 8. Walz was the first to agree to an October 1 debate that same day, with Vance agreeing to the date the following day.

==== Preparations ====
Republican Minnesota Representative Tom Emmer played Walz in Vance's debate prep, which was directed by Jai Chabria and Jason Miller. Transportation Secretary Pete Buttigieg played Vance in Walz's prep, which was led by Zaym Siddique, Liz Allen, and Chris Schmitter.

=== Format ===
The debate was hosted on CBS and lasted for 90 minutes. Both candidates' microphones were left on while the other candidate spoke, unlike the previous 2024 presidential debates, though CBS had the right to turn off candidate microphones. Neither candidate was allowed to ask the other questions, with only the moderators allowed to do so. At the end of the debate, Walz delivered his closing remarks first, then Vance. Margaret Brennan and Norah O'Donnell were the moderators.

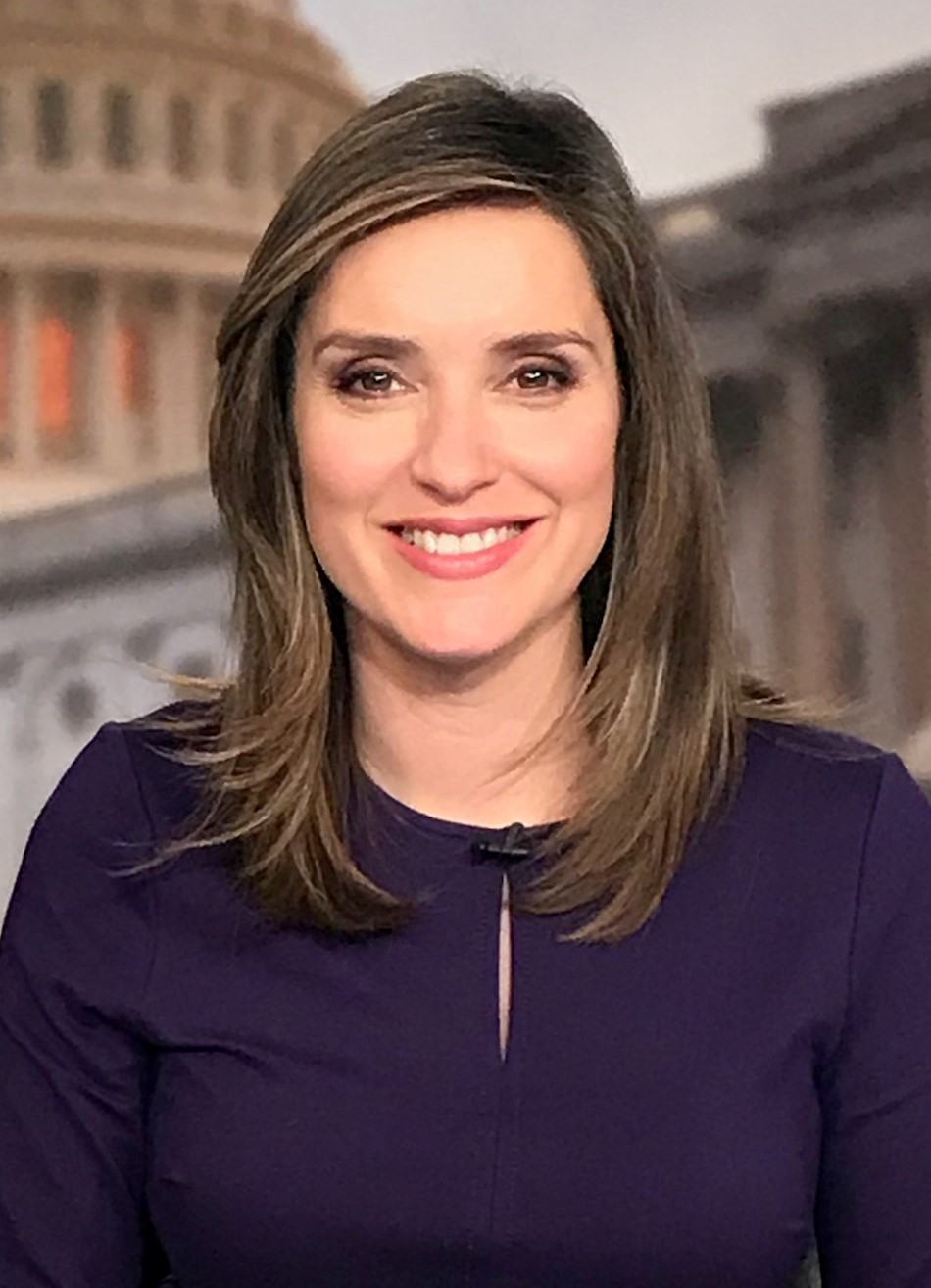
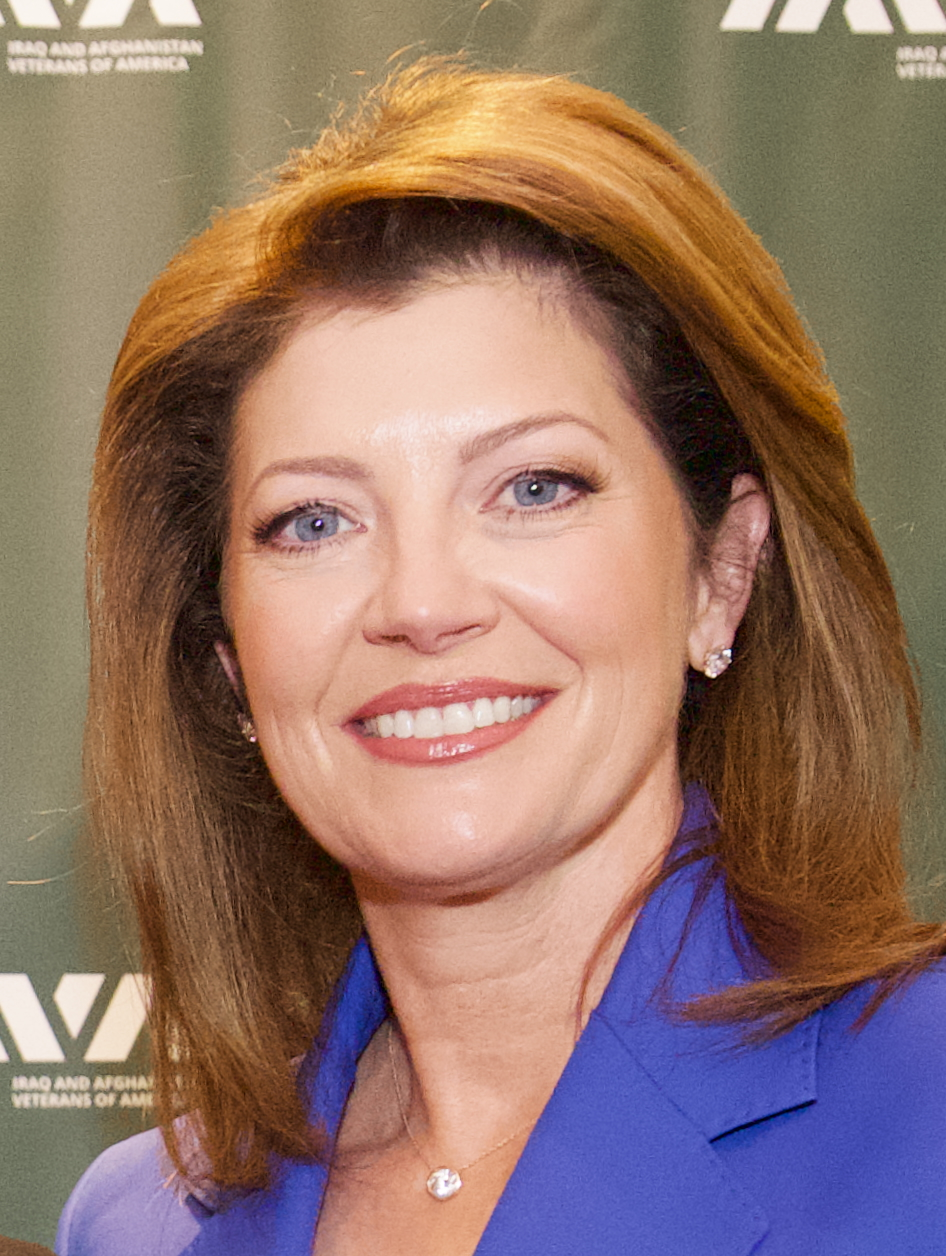
Moderators Margaret Brennan and Norah O'Donnell

=== Debate ===
During the debate, both candidates argued for the economic policies of their respective running mates. Walz argued that under the Harris economic proposals, costs for housing and prescription drugs would decrease. Vance said Harris's economic agenda "sounds pretty good", but stated she could have implemented it as vice president if she had chosen to, and he blamed her for many of the country's economic challenges, claiming more voters trust Trump on the economy.

When Walz brought up Amber Thurman, a Georgian woman who died after a delay in getting a procedure to clear fetal tissue from her body after a medical abortion, Vance said: "I agree with you. Amber Thurman should still be alive." Vance also asserted he did not support a national abortion ban, although he had supported a "minimum national standard" when he was running for Senate.

Reuters reported Vance's statement that the United States is “the cleanest economy in the entire world” is false. Vance had been responding to a question about climate change, saying he and Trump support "clean air and water”. He suggested the best response to climate change would be to "reshore as much American manufacturing as possible and you'd want to produce as much energy as possible" in the U.S. He also suggested building more nuclear power plants and said Harris has not invested enough in natural gas.

Walz responded by saying "climate change is real" and "reducing our impact is absolutely critical." In addition to clean energy and oil production, he said "we're producing more natural gas than we ever have." He then spoke about the need for climate mitigation, which he said the Bipartisan Infrastructure Law is helping with.

Vance refused to admit that Donald Trump lost the election, stating "Tim, I'm focused on the future”. Walz's response was "that's a damning non-answer." Vance also downplayed the severity of the January 6 United States Capitol attack and Trump's role in challenging the 2020 election results. Vance asked Walz if he supported social media censorship.

Vance was asked how the Trump administration would implement its campaign pledge to "carry out the largest mass deportation plan in American history and to use the U.S. military to do so" and whether parents who have entered the country illegally would be deported and separated from children born on U.S. soil. Vance responded that he would start with "about a million" immigrants who have committed crimes besides entering the country illegally and complained about "Kamala Harris's wide open southern border."

Walz responded by touting Harris's record as California attorney general prosecuting human trafficking and said Trump did not deliver on his 2016 campaign promise to build a border wall and get Mexico to pay for it. He also complained that Trump got the bipartisan Secure the Border Act scuttled in 2023, which would have funded additional border agents, drug detection, and faster adjudication.

Walz spoke slightly more than Vance during the debate, with CNN reporting that Walz spoke for approximately 40 minutes and 42 seconds, while Vance spoke for 38 minutes and 59 seconds.

==== Fact-checking ====
CBS stated in late September that the moderators would not fact-check the candidates during the debate, with fact-checking instead handled online and on-air only after the debate. When Vance was fact checked on the status of Haitian immigrants in Springfield, Ohio, he objected saying, "The rules were that you were not going to fact check", and argued that the immigrants should not be considered legal because the federal government decided their protected status after they had arrived in the United States. Walz rejected Vance's argument, and the microphones were muted as Vance continued speaking.

=== Viewership ===
Nielsen Media Research reported that 43 million viewers across CBS and 15 other television networks watched the debate, down from 57 million viewers during the 2020 vice presidential debate.

=== Reception ===
Debate winner
Outlet	Vance	Walz	Tie
CNN	51%	49%	Steady
CBS	42%	41%	17%
Politico/Focaldata	50%	50%	Steady

Vance's debate performance was praised by political pundits, and he was declared the winner by columnists from The New York Times, The Wall Street Journal, the Los Angeles Times, USA Today, the Financial Times, and Politico. The columnists from The Washington Post and Reuters commended both Vance and Walz for the high level of civility and focus on policy in the debate.

According to a flash poll by CBS News and YouGov, Vance was only slightly ahead with 42 percent of viewers thinking him to be the winner, followed closely by 41 percent believing Walz won it, while 17 percent said the debate was tied. The poll also reported that 88 percent of viewers found the tone of the debate was "generally positive".

Ross Douthat wrote in The New York Times that Vance delivered "one of the best debating performances by a Republican nominee for president or vice president in recent memory", making a strong case for Trump's record while also emphasizing his own personal biography, after facing weeks of attacks from the Democrats. Politico noted that Vance offered an effective critique of Biden-Harris administration, while managing to move past his controversial past statements about women and immigrants. However, he did face criticism for not acknowledging Trump's loss of the 2020 election.

The VP debate was broadly considered a polite and policy-focused event, in which Vance and Walz agreed with each other a lot; after the debate, they chatted and introduced their wives to each other. Vance also used the debate platform to remind viewers about his middle-class background and that he went to college with the help of the G.I. Bill after serving in Iraq.

== Other proposed debates ==
=== Proposed RFK Jr. vs Trump debate ===
On May 7, 2024, Robert F. Kennedy Jr. issued an open letter challenging former President Trump to debate him at the Libertarian National Convention, where both were already scheduled to speak from May 24–25, citing Trump's frequent and vocal claims that he would be willing to debate anywhere and Kennedy's own competitive polling with both major candidates. Trump did not respond to this challenge.

=== Proposed Harris–Vance debate ===
A vice presidential debate in July was initially proposed, which would have taken place after the selection of a vice presidential candidate at the 2024 Republican National Convention. The Biden campaign agreed to a vice presidential debate hosted by CBS News to take place on either July 23 or August 13. The Trump campaign confirmed with Politico that it was aware of the offer, but had not yet made a decision. Trump stated on May 17 he agreed to a vice presidential debate on behalf of his future vice presidential pick. Bret Baier of Fox News stated in an interview with Martha MacCallum held on May 17 that Fox would be willing to host a vice presidential debate on July 23, August 13, or "following both party conventions".

Following the selection of U.S. Senator JD Vance as the Republican vice presidential nominee, Vice President Kamala Harris had left Vance a voicemail on July 15 to congratulate him on his nomination. They spoke the following day, though terms for the debate were still under discussion. Vance rejected the call for a vice presidential debate, citing concerns over Biden's status as the presumptive Democratic nominee being in doubt following the first presidential debate.

=== Proposed second Harris–Trump debate ===
Soon after the September 10 debate, the Harris campaign called for Trump to attend a second debate with Harris, that would be held sometime in October. Initially, Trump was non-committal, saying he would be "less inclined to" debate Harris a second time and that Harris only wanted another debate because she lost "very badly," but that he would "think about it." CBS News offered to host a debate to be held at Arizona State University in October. On September 12, Trump announced he would not take part in another debate with Harris. The next day, he said he might be willing to debate if he "got in the right mood".

On September 21, Kamala Harris accepted an invitation from CNN to participate in a debate to be hosted at the CNN Studios in Atlanta on October 23. However, Trump said it was "just too late," as "voting has already started." (Early voting varies by state, with some states mailing ballots earlier than others.) On October 2, a day after the vice presidential debate, Trump said he would not debate Harris again. On October 9, Fox News invited both candidates to participate in a debate to be hosted on either October 24 or October 27. Hours later, Trump reaffirmed in a Truth Social post that he would not debate Harris again.

== Minor debates and forums ==
Various debates and forums have been held, sponsored by the Free & Equal Elections Foundation.

== See also ==
- Free & Equal Elections Foundation
- 2024 Democratic Party presidential debates and forums
- 2024 Republican Party presidential debates and forums
