= David Muir =

American broadcast journalist (born 1973)

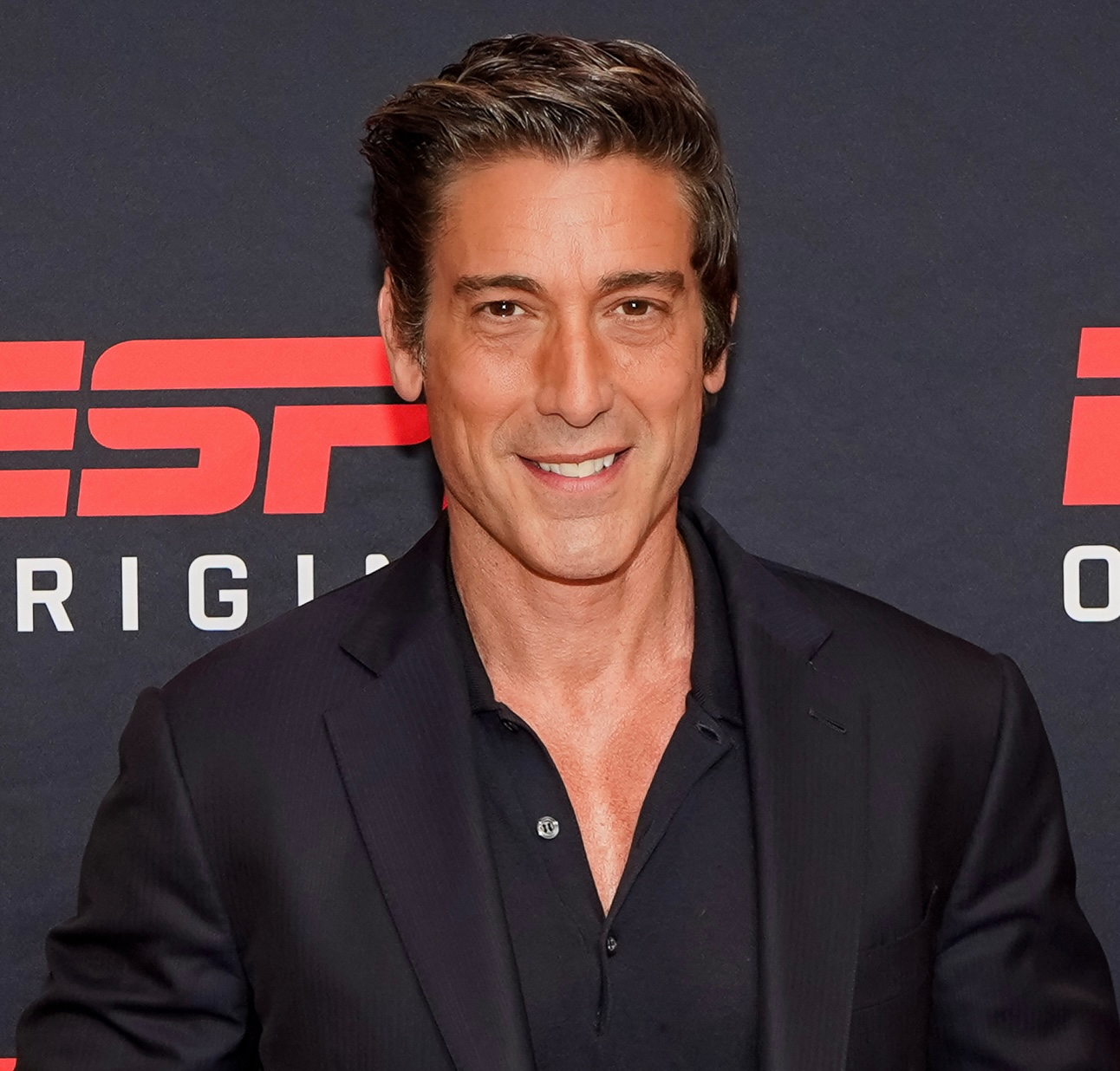
- Muir in 2025
- Born: David Jason Muir; November 8, 1973 (age 53); Syracuse, New York, U.S.
- Education: Ithaca College (BA)
- Occupations: News anchor; television journalist; managing editor
- Years active: 1994–present
- Employer: The Walt Disney Company
- Television: ABC World News Tonight (2007–present); 20/20 (2013–present)
- Title: Anchor of ABC World News Tonight
- Predecessor: Diane Sawyer

David Jason Muir (/ˈmjʊər/ MURE; born November 8, 1973) is an American journalist and anchor for ABC World News Tonight and co-anchor of the ABC News magazine 20/20, part of the news department of the ABC broadcast-television network, based in New York City. Muir previously served as the weekend anchor and primary substitute anchor on ABC's World News Tonight with Diane Sawyer before succeeding her on September 1, 2014.

Since joining ABC News in 2003, Muir has reported from hotspots all over the world, with dispatches from Afghanistan, Iraq, Iran, Ukraine, Tahrir Square, Mogadishu, Gaza, Guantanamo, Fukushima, Beirut, Amman, and the Syrian border, among other places. At ABC News, Muir has won multiple Emmy and Edward R. Murrow awards for his national and international journalism. He was the 2024 recipient of the Walter Cronkite Award for Excellence in Journalism. In both 2023 and 2024 Muir won the Emmy for Outstanding Live News Program and the Edward R. Murrow Award for Network TV Newscast.

Muir has become one of the most visible journalists in America. World News Tonight with David Muir has been the most watched newscast in the United States since 2015. Muir's climate reporting has also been recognized with the George Polk Award, and the Alfred I. duPont-Columbia Award.

== Early life and education ==
Muir was born into a Catholic family in Syracuse, New York and grew up in Onondaga Hill. Muir has one older sibling, two younger stepsiblings, six nieces, and three nephews.

As a child, he watched ABC News' flagship program each night with his family. Muir credits longtime anchor Peter Jennings as his biggest journalistic influence.

Muir graduated from Onondaga Central Junior-Senior High School in May 1991. He attended Ithaca College, graduating magna cum laude with a Bachelor of Arts degree in journalism in May 1995. During high school, he interned at WTVH-TV in Syracuse. While in college, he was inspired by a professor who told him he had "the cut of a TV newsman". He spent a semester at the Institute on Political Journalism at the Fund for American Studies at Georgetown University and another semester abroad at the University of Salamanca in Spain with the Institute for the International Education of Students.

== Career ==
=== WTVH television ===
From 1994 to 2000, Muir worked as an anchor and a reporter at WTVH-TV in Syracuse, New York. Muir's reports from Jerusalem, Tel Aviv, Israel, and the Gaza Strip following the 1995 assassination of Israeli prime minister Yitzhak Rabin earned him top honors from the Radio-Television News Directors Association. The Associated Press honored Muir for Best Enterprise Reporting and Best Television Interview. The Syracuse Press Club recognized Muir as the anchor of the "Best Local Newscast", and he was voted one of the "Best Local News Anchors" in Syracuse.

=== WCVB television ===
From 2000 to 2003, Muir was an anchor and reporter for WCVB television in Boston, where he won the regional Edward R. Murrow Award for investigative reporting and the National Headliner Award and Associated Press honors for his work tracing the path of the hijackers involved in the September 11, 2001, attacks. The Associated Press also recognized his news anchoring and reporting.

=== ABC News ===
In August 2003, Muir joined ABC News as anchor of the overnight news program World News Now. He also became the anchor of ABC News' early morning newscast World News This Morning. In 2006, and occasionally after that, he co-anchored the newsmagazine Primetime. In June 2007, Muir became the anchor of World News Saturday. In February 2011, Muir became an anchor for both weekend newscasts, and the broadcast was named World News with David Muir. Muir has been silently credited with a rise in the ratings of the weekend evening broadcasts. In March 2013, Muir was promoted to co-anchor ABC's 20/20 with Elizabeth Vargas.

==== Early anchoring and reporting ====
In September 2005, Muir was inside the New Orleans Superdome as Hurricane Katrina hit and stayed in New Orleans to report on the unfolding humanitarian crisis. Muir's reports revealed and highlighted the deteriorating conditions inside the Convention Center and Charity Hospital as Muir waded through chest-deep water to find patients trapped inside the hospital.

Muir reported from the Israeli-Lebanon border in October 2006 on the Israeli war with Hezbollah. Muir was in Gaza in March 2007 to cover the Hamas coup, reporting from inside the Gaza Strip. In October 2007, Muir was dispatched to Peru after the worst earthquake to hit that country in more than two decades.

In September 2008, Muir reported from Ukraine, more than two decades after the Chernobyl nuclear accident. In April 2009, David Muir and Diane Sawyer reported a 20/20 hour about guns in America getting "disturbing results" as described by the New York Daily News.

In May 2009, Muir's reporting on 20/20 revealed a significant increase in the number of homeless children in America. Muir made multiple trips to the Gulf of Mexico to investigate the BP oil spill.

In January 2010, Muir traveled to Haiti in the wake of the devastating earthquake, which orphaned tens of thousands of children and destroyed the country's buildings and basic services. More than 220,000 people died, and many others were injured in the 7.0-magnitude quake. He has returned to Haiti multiple times since the earthquake hit, uncovering attacks on women and the unfolding mental health crisis in Port au Prince.

In June 2011, Muir reported from Tahrir Square during the political revolution in Egypt, and from Fukushima, Japan following the deadly tsunami and nuclear power plant accident. Muir wrote about his reporting from Mogadishu, Somalia, and his subsequent return, "Inside Somalia's Crippling Famine", for the Daily Beast.

In November 2012, Muir served as one of ABC's lead correspondents for the 2012 U.S. presidential election. Muir's interviews with Republican candidate Mitt Romney generated national headlines on the issues of economics and immigration policy in the United States.

In December 2012, Muir also anchored several hours of the Sandy Hook Elementary School shooting as it unfolded, and then reported from the scene as President Obama visited the town. Muir also reported from the movie theater mass shooting in Aurora, Colorado; from Joplin, Missouri, in the aftermath of a destructive tornado; and from Tucson, Arizona, after the shooting of Congresswoman Gabby Giffords that left six others dead.

In January 2013, Muir reported from inside Iran, leading up to the nuclear talks. Muir was the first Western journalist to report from Mogadishu, Somalia, on the famine. Muir and his team came under fire while reporting from Mogadishu. In 2013, he received the Edward R. Murrow Award for his reporting.

==== World News Tonight with David Muir ====
On June 27, 2014, ABC News announced that Muir would succeed Diane Sawyer as the anchor and managing editor of ABC World News. Muir made his debut broadcast on September 1, 2014.

In April 2015, World News Tonight with David Muir became the country's most-watched evening newscast, outpacing NBC Nightly News for the first time since September 7, 2009.

Muir's Emmy-nominated Made in America series on the American economy is a continuing feature on his broadcast. Muir has brought the series to other television programs, including ABC's The View, where he has served as guest co-host.

In March 2016, Muir released a year-long report on the heroin crisis in America winning a CINE Golden Eagle Award for his reporting.

Muir has moderated multiple Democratic and Republican Presidential Primary debates and interviewed numerous presidential candidates.

During one of Muir's interviews with Secretary of State Hillary Clinton in 2015, she admitted it was a mistake to use a private e-mail server and offered her first apology to the American people.

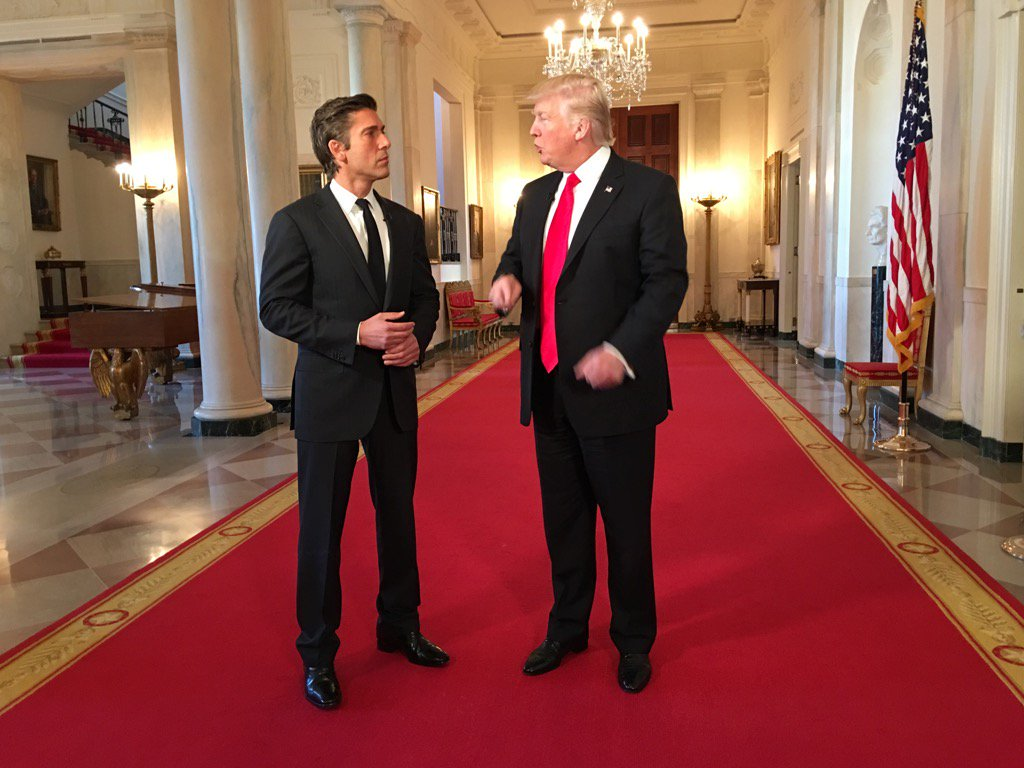
Muir first interview since President Donald Trump taking office, in 2017

Muir interviewed then president Donald Trump on January 25, 2017, in the White House. It was Trump's first interview as president, five days after inauguration.

In 2020, Muir's ratings sharply increased during the beginning of the COVID-19 pandemic along with the other Evening News programs, averaging around 12 million viewers, and becoming the most-watched TV program. On May 6, 2020, Muir interviewed President Donald Trump about the COVID Pandemic.

Ahead of the 2020 presidential election, Muir conducted the first joint interview with Democratic nominee Joe Biden and his running mate, then-senator Kamala Harris. He has interviewed President Biden multiple times. At the White House in December 2021, Muir pressed Biden on whether the U.S. was prepared for the Covid surge. In February 2023, Muir conducted two interviews with President Biden, one in Warsaw on U.S. support for Ukraine. Muir also interviewed Biden in Normandy during the 80th anniversary of D-Day.

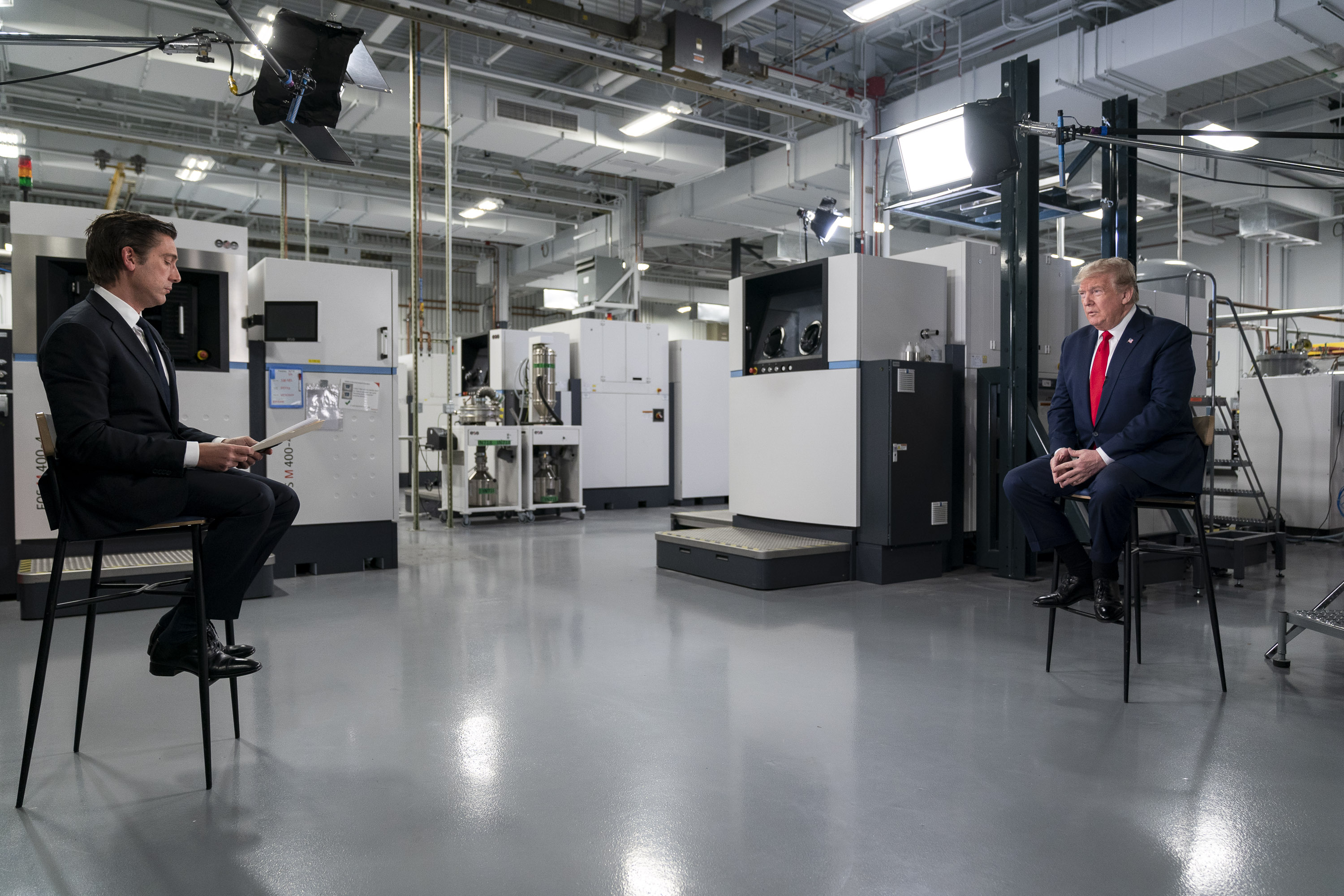
Muir interviewing President Donald Trump, in 2020

Muir was the first network anchor to interview Ukrainian president Volodymyr Zelenskyy after the Russian invasion of Ukraine. Muir later interviewed Zelenskyy in Kyiv as Ukraine began its counteroffensive against Russia. In 2021, Muir became the lead anchor of breaking news and special event coverage for ABC News, a role previously held by GMA anchor George Stephanopoulos from 2014 to 2020.

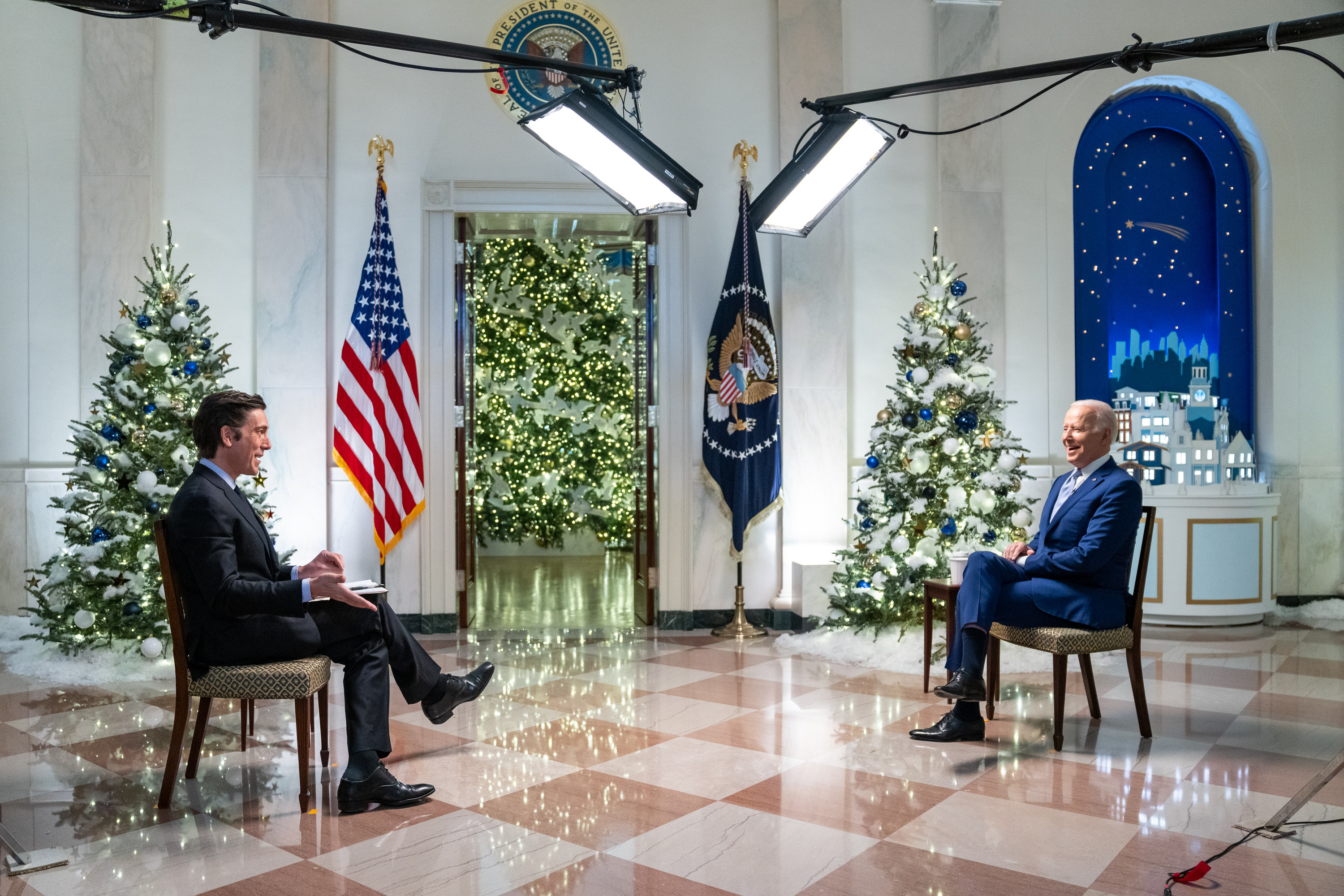
Muir interviewing President Joe Biden, in 2021

Also in 2021, Muir traveled to Southern Madagascar to report on what the United Nations World Food Programme warned was the world's first climate-change driven famine. After the report aired, ABC News viewers donated over $3 million to the World Food Programme. The report earned Muir a prestigious George Polk Award for environmental reporting, as well as two News & Documentary Emmy Awards.

In 2023, he traveled to South Sudan to report on the historic flooding that had destroyed communities, leading to severe malnutrition as war broke out to the north in Sudan. Muir's report South Sudan: Isolated by Water and War earned a News & Documentary Emmy, and anchored ABC News’ climate coverage recognized with a Alfred I. duPont-Columbia award.

==== 2024 Presidential debate ====
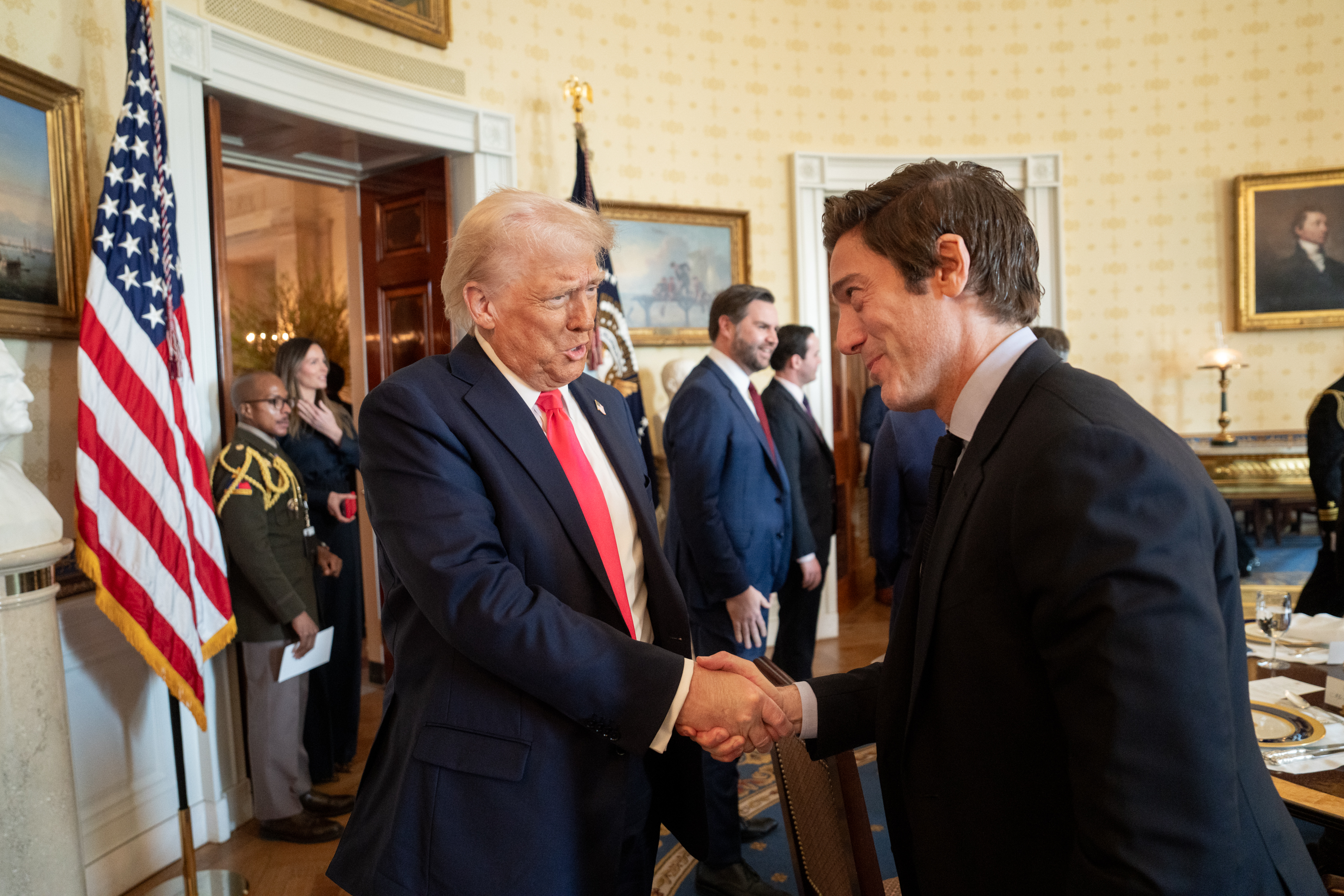
Muir with President Donald Trump in the Blue Room of the White House, in 2025

On September 10, 2024, Muir and Linsey Davis moderated a presidential debate on ABC News between former president Donald Trump and Vice President Kamala Harris, which was watched by nearly 70 million Americans. Muir frequently fact-checked Trump for making false statements, including Trump's false claim that Haitian immigrants in Springfield, Ohio, were eating dogs and cats. Muir pressed Harris on whether she bears any responsibility for the chaotic and deadly withdrawal from Afghanistan, and on the economy, Muir asked Harris if Americans were better off than they were 4 years ago. Muir’s and Davis's interjections sparked claims of bias from Trump and discussion over the role of moderators in presidential debates. The New York Times said ABC’s Matter-of-Fact Moderators Built Factual Guardrails Around Trump and Columbia Journalism Review said The refs worked.

On June 6, 2024, Muir interviewed President Joe Biden in Normandy. During the interview, Muir pressed Biden on whether he would pardon his son, Hunter Biden. Biden told Muir he would not. On December 1, 2024, Biden reversed course, pardoning his son. Multiple news outlets cited Muir’s interview and Biden’s pledge that he would not pardon his son.

== Honors ==
- Muir delivered the commencement address at his alma mater, Ithaca College, in May 2011; he urged graduates to use their voices. On March 13, 2015, the college awarded Muir an honorary Doctor of Letters degree and the Jessica Savitch Award of Distinction for Excellence in Journalism.
- In 2012, Muir was awarded an Edward R. Murrow for Hard News Reporting for A Cry For Help: Famine in Somalia.
- In 2013, TV Week called Muir one of the "12 to Watch in TV News". He was listed as one of People's Sexiest Men Alive in 2014.
- On May 8, 2015, Muir delivered the commencement address at Northeastern University in Massachusetts. During the ceremony, he was given an honorary Doctor of Media degree.
- In 2017, Muir's reporting for 20/20 "Heroin: Breaking Point in America" on the heroin epidemic won a CINE Golden Eagle Award in the News Program/Continuing Coverage category.
- Muir moderated a town hall with President Barack Obama on race and policing after a series of police-involved shootings in the summer of 2016, winning a News & Documentary Emmy.
- On May 12, 2018, Muir delivered the commencement address at the University of Wisconsin-Madison in Madison, Wisconsin.
- In 2018, ABC World News Tonight with David Muir received the RTDNA Edward R. Murrow Award for TV Network Newscast, for their coverage of the Santa Rosa wildfires.
- Muir's live reporting from Panama City Beach, Florida later that year, as Hurricane Michael hit the panhandle as a category 5 storm won a News & Documentary Emmy for breaking news.
- In 2019, Muir would win another Emmy for his reporting on the Las Vegas shooting for ABC's 20/20.
- In 2020, Muir traveled to the Auschwitz concentration camp with a group of survivors who had been imprisoned at the camp as children. That report earned him a News & Documentary Emmy a year later.
- On May 15, 2022, Muir delivered the commencement address at Syracuse University in Syracuse, New York.
- In 2022, Muir's reporting on climate change-driven famine in Madagascar earned him a prestigious George Polk Award and a News & Documentary Emmy for environmental journalism. The report was also part of ABC World News Tonight's Emmy win for continuing coverage on the climate crisis.
- On September 19, 2023, Muir was named the winner of the 40th Cronkite Award by Arizona State University's Walter Cronkite School of Journalism and Mass Communication.
- On January 25, 2024, Muir and ABC News were recognized with a Alfred I. duPont-Columbia Silver Baton Award for Environmental Reporting. Later that same year, his climate reporting from South Sudan earned him a News & Documentary Emmy.
- Muir has received multiple News and Documentary Emmy Awards and Edward R. Murrow Awards for his reports. On September 27, 2023, Muir was awarded a News & Documentary Emmy for Outstanding Live News Program and an RTDNA Edward R. Murrow Award for TV Network Newscast. In 2024, ABC World News Tonight with David Muir received both awards for the second year in a row.
- In 2025, Muir was named in TIME100 list of most influential people of 2025 by TIME magazine. He was also was ranked fifth on Mediaite’s Most Influential in News Media list, reflecting his continued prominence as anchor of the most-watched news program on U.S. television. Under his leadership, World News Tonight ranked as the top evening newscast for ten consecutive years, averaging more than eight million viewers in late 2025, with additional audiences across digital platforms. Mediaite noted that Muir had “built an ardent following of millions who trust him to deliver them the nightly news and remain loyal in an increasingly fragmented media environment.”
- In 2025, Muir was presented with the 2025 Lew Klein Excellence in Media Award by Temple University’s Klein College of Media and Communications.
- In 2025, Muir received a lifetime achievement award from the Library of American Broadcasting Foundation (LABF).

== See also ==
- New Yorkers in journalism

Media offices
Preceded by Diane Sawyer	ABC World News Tonight Weekday Edition Anchor; September 1, 2014–present	Incumbent
