= Linsey Davis =

American journalist

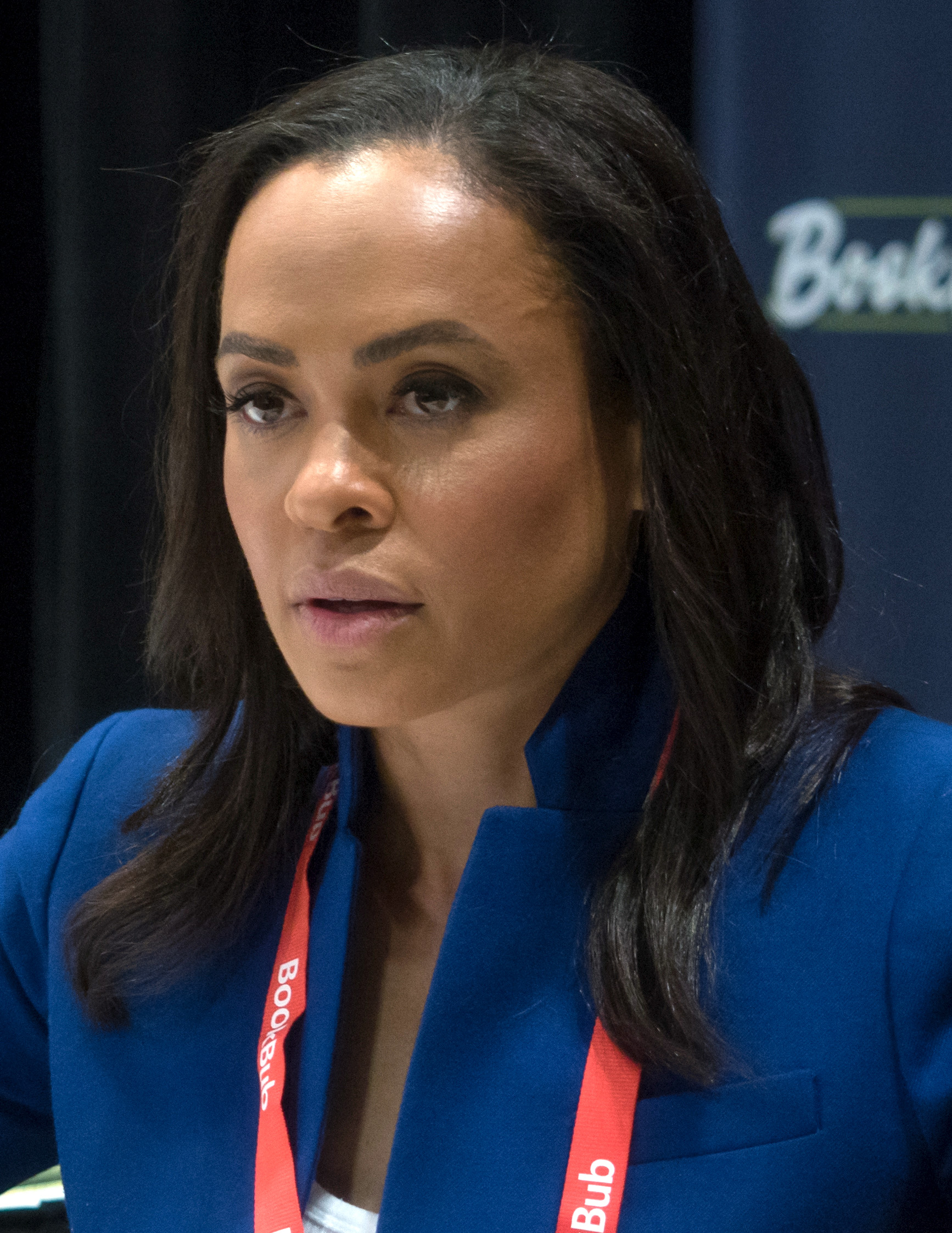
- Davis in 2019
- Born: Linsey Theyer Davis; October 21, 1977 (age 48); Medford, New Jersey, United States
- Education: University of Virginia (BA); New York University (MA)
- Occupations: Journalist; children's writer
- Employers: WJRT-TV (2001–2003); WTHR-TV (2003–2007); ABC News (2007–present)
- Notable work: ABC News Live Prime; ABC World News Tonight Sunday; Good Morning America; 20/20
- Spouse: Paul Roberts (m. 2013)
- Children: 1
- Website: www.linseytdavis.com

Linsey Theyer Davis (born October 21, 1977) is an American broadcast journalist at ABC News, who currently anchors the Sunday edition of World News Tonight and the network's weekday prime-time streaming program, ABC News Live Prime with Linsey Davis. She is also a substitute anchor for Good Morning America, and the weekday and Saturday editions of ABC World News Tonight.

== Early life ==
Davis was raised in Medford, New Jersey. She graduated from the Moorestown Friends School in neighboring Moorestown, New Jersey, in 1995. She earned a bachelor's degree from the University of Virginia, where she was also a member of the Alpha Kappa Alpha sorority. She earned a master's degree in communication from New York University.

== Career ==
Davis has been a longtime correspondent for ABC, reporting for Good Morning America, 20/20, Nightline, and World News Tonight. She launched the flagship streaming broadcast on February 10, 2020. The following year, it was announced that Davis would take over anchor responsibilities for the Sunday edition of World News Tonight, with Whit Johnson handling Saturday duties, following the departure of network anchor Tom Llamas to NBC News. In 2022, Adweek reported that Davis was adding radio to her responsibilities, saying she would "deliver the top stories in ABC News Radio's national 5 p.m. ET newscast Monday to Thursday each week." Adweek noted, Davis took on a role once held by Peter Jennings and Charles Gibson.

In addition to her anchoring roles on broadcast television, streaming, and radio, Variety states that "Since 2019... Davis has appeared alongside George Stephanopoulos and David Muir to help anchor presidential debates, election coverage and other critical news events." Linsey was one of the moderators for the 2024 presidential debate with former President Donald J. Trump and Vice President Kamala D. Harris.

Davis is also the author of four children's books, including How High Is Heaven? (2022).
