= 2024 Republican Party presidential debates and forums =

Five candidates' debates took place during the campaign for the Republican Party's nomination for president of the United States in 2024. In addition, several candidate forums were held.

== Schedule ==
Debates among candidates for the 2024 Republican Party U.S. presidential nomination
No.	Date and time	Place	Host	Participants												
P Present A Absent N Not invited W Withdrawn				Burgum	Christie	DeSantis	Elder	Haley	Hurd	Hutchinson	Johnson	Pence	Ramaswamy	Scott	Suarez	Trump
1	August 23, 2023; 8 pm CDT	Fiserv Forum; Milwaukee, WI	Fox News; Rumble	P	P	P	N	P	N	P	N	P	P	P	N	N (Note: Trump refused to sign the loyalty pledge, which disqualified him from participating. Trump instead participated in an interview with former Fox News host Tucker Carlson which aired on Twitter on the night of the debate.)
2	September 27, 2023; 6 pm PDT	Reagan Library; Simi Valley, CA	Fox Business; Rumble; Univision	P	P	P	N	P	N	N	N	P	P	P	W	N (Note: Trump refused to sign the loyalty pledge, which disqualified him from participating. Trump instead met with auto industry workers and delivered a speech in Detroit.)
3	November 8, 2023; 8 pm EST	Arsht Center; Miami, FL	NBC News; Salem Radio Network; RJC; Rumble	N	P	P	W	P	W	N	W	W	P	P	W	N (Note: Trump refused to sign the loyalty pledge, which disqualified him from participating. Trump instead held a rally in Hialeah.)
4	December 6, 2023; 7 pm CST	University of Alabama; Tuscaloosa, AL	NewsNation; The Megyn Kelly Show; The Washington Free Beacon; Rumble; The CW	W	P	P	W	P	W	N	W	W	P	W	W	N (Note: Trump refused to sign the loyalty pledge, which disqualified him from participating. Trump attended a fundraising event for MAGA Inc., a Super PAC supporting his candidacy, instead.)
5	January 10, 2024; 9 pm EST	Drake University; Des Moines, IA	CNN	W	W	P	W	P	W	N	W	W	N	W	W	A (Note: Trump declined to attend, and instead held a competing town hall with Fox News.)

== First debate ==
Qualified candidates for the first debate
Candidate	Met donor criterion	Met polling criteria (per Politico)		Signed loyalty pledge	Met all three criteria/ invited	Additional ref(s)
Candidate	Met donor criterion	National polls	State polls	Signed loyalty pledge	Met all three criteria/ invited	Additional ref(s)
Burgum	Yes	Yes (8 qualifying polls)	Yes (6 qualifying polls from 2 states)	Yes	Yes	
Christie	Yes	Yes (18 qualifying polls)	Yes (8 qualifying polls from 3 states)	Yes	Yes	
DeSantis	Yes	Yes (18 qualifying polls)	Yes (8 qualifying polls from 3 states)	Yes	Yes	
Haley	Yes	Yes (18 qualifying polls)	Yes (8 qualifying polls from 3 states)	Yes	Yes	
Hutchinson	Yes	Yes (9 qualifying polls)	Yes (5 qualifying polls from 3 states)	Yes	Yes	
Pence	Yes	Yes (18 qualifying polls)	Yes (8 qualifying polls from 3 states)	Yes	Yes	
Ramaswamy	Yes	Yes (18 qualifying polls)	Yes (8 qualifying polls from 3 states)	Yes	Yes	
Scott	Yes	Yes (18 qualifying polls)	Yes (8 qualifying polls from 3 states)	Yes	Yes	
Trump	Yes	Yes (18 qualifying polls)	Yes (8 qualifying polls from 3 states)	No	No	
Suarez (Note: A pro-Suarez PAC, SOS America PAC, had claimed that Suarez had three additional qualifying polls. Two anonymous senior advisors for the Republican National Committee (RNC) stated that these polls did not meet their outlined criteria.)	Yes	Yes (2 qualifying polls)	No (1 qualifying poll from 1 state)	Yes	No	
Johnson	Yes	No (1 qualifying poll)	Yes (2 qualifying polls from 2 states)	Yes	No	
Hurd	Yes	No (1 qualifying poll)	Yes (4 qualifying polls from 2 states)	No	No	
Elder (Note: Elder's campaign had claimed that their candidate had two additional qualifying national polls.)	Yes	No (1 qualifying poll)	No (1 qualifying poll from 1 state)	Yes	No	

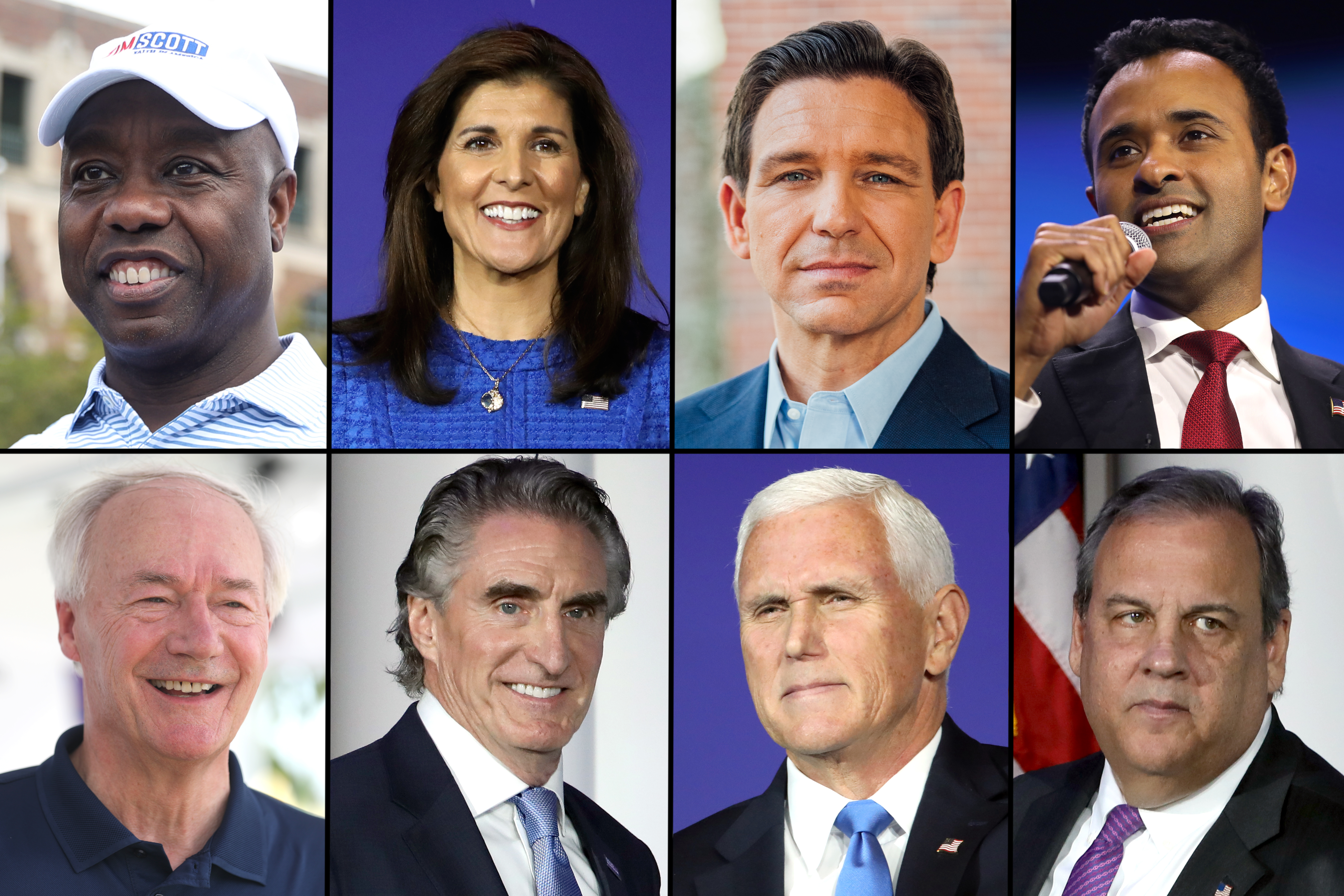
All of the candidates of the first debate. Top row: Senator of South Carolina Tim Scott, Former Governor of South Carolina Nikki Haley, Governor of Florida Ron DeSantis, entrepreneur Vivek Ramaswamy. Bottom row: former Governor of Arkansas Asa Hutchinson, Governor of North Dakota Doug Burgum, former Vice President Mike Pence, former Governor of New Jersey Chris Christie.

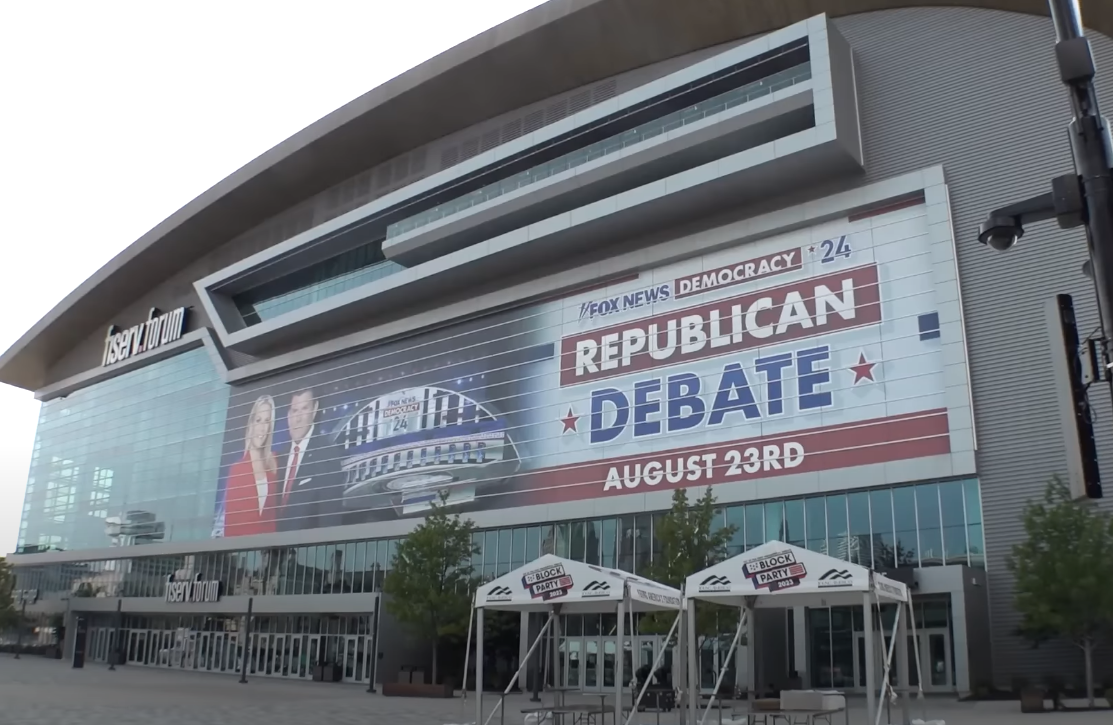
The Fiserv Forum in Milwaukee, Wisconsin on the eve of the 1st debate, August 2023.

The first Republican primary debate was aired by Fox News and held from 8 p.m. to 10 p.m. Central Time Zone on August 23, 2023, at Fiserv Forum in Milwaukee, Wisconsin. It was moderated by Bret Baier and Martha MacCallum.

=== Criteria ===
On June 2, 2023, the RNC announced criteria to qualify for the first debate, and it issued a clarification on July 18. Participants had to meet the following criteria:

1. Be constitutionally eligible and appropriately filed with the Federal Election Commission.
2. Sign the "Beat Biden Pledge" by August 21 indicating that they will not participate in any non-RNC debate and that they will support the eventual nominee.
3. Prove to the RNC by August 21 that they have polled above one percent since July in three national polls – or in two national polls and one poll from each of two different early primary states (Iowa, New Hampshire, Nevada, and South Carolina). The polls must meet RNC stated standards.
4. Prove to the RNC by August 21 they have attracted donations from at least 40,000 individuals, with at least 200 from each of 20 states or territories.

On April 25, Donald Trump raised uncertainty about his participation in the debates on Truth Social, saying he had not been consulted about them, did not want to be "libeled" and it was unnecessary given his large polling lead. He was open to participating in the debates in an interview conducted with Bret Baier on Fox News two months later. Weeks later, Chris Christie denounced the pledge requirement, but indicated he had signed the pledge to make it onstage and would not make himself abide by it.

The rules have been noted as relatively strict, compared to the 2016 Republican presidential debates, which had multiple debate nights to accommodate the numerous qualified candidates, as well as an initial debate night with 17 candidates spread over two debates. Asa Hutchinson has stated they will keep some campaigns from the debate while Larry Elder described the rules as "onerous". Perry Johnson called them "ridiculous" and began selling one dollar "I stand with Tucker" and "I identify as Non-Bidenary" T-shirts on Facebook, counting each sale as a campaign donation. Similarly, Ramaswamy's campaign ran Facebook ads asking people for one dollar to "secure a prime spot" at the debate.

The Ron DeSantis campaign reportedly pushed for a higher threshold, likely to consolidate non-Trump votes towards his campaign.

On July 7, the DeSantis campaign said that DeSantis would attend the debate, regardless of Trump's participation.

Nikki Haley and Vivek Ramaswamy have claimed more than 60,000 donations each. Trump, DeSantis and Tim Scott have also purportedly exceeded the 40,000 donor threshold. Christie announced he reached 40,000 donors on July 12. Doug Burgum claimed he met the donor threshold on July 19 in part due to offering $20 gift cards for $1 donations.

On July 23, Politico reported that six candidates had unofficially qualified for the debate following the publication of two state polls from Fox News: Christie, DeSantis, Haley, Ramaswamy, Scott, and Trump. Two days later, Burgum unofficially qualified as well.

One of Pence's advisors announced that the campaign had received "more than 7,400 donations" since Trump's third indictment, which took place on August 1. On August 7, Pence announced he had made it to 40,000 donors, qualifying for the debates. Suarez also announced that he had met the donor threshold.

Trump stated in an interview on Newsmax on August 9 that he would not pledge to support the eventual Republican nominee, one of the requirements to qualify for the debate. On August 14, the Super PAC supporting Suarez claimed that he unofficially qualified for the debate by attaining four national polls, with one percent in each one, though his campaign stated that there was "no announcement at this time".

On August 18, Trump announced he would skip the first debate, instead opting for an interview with Tucker Carlson. Johnson unofficially qualified for the debate on August 18. Suarez claimed to have qualified the same day, based on the polling criteria, though RNC officials stated that he had not met the criteria. On August 19, a pro-Suarez PAC claimed he unofficially qualified for the debate, but neither the campaign nor any major media outlet confirmed the claims.

Hutchinson unofficially qualified on August 20 after exceeding the donor threshold. Trump confirmed via a post on his Truth Social account that he would not attend any of the debates.

There were 26 polls that appeared to qualify for the first debate according to Politico’s analysis: 18 national, three each from Iowa and New Hampshire, and two from South Carolina. However, the RNC never confirmed this number and disqualified a Victory Insights Poll that Politico had originally included.

On August 21, the RNC invited eight candidates to the first debate: Burgum, Christie, DeSantis, Haley, Hutchinson, Pence, Ramaswamy, and Scott.

=== Summary ===
The debate focused on issues relating to the crisis at the border with Mexico, the economy, abortion, and foreign policy. Donald Trump's absence and criminal charges also took up a portion of the debate with candidates taking different positions on whether it would be appropriate for the party to nominate someone who may be criminally convicted. Christie said that Trump was "morally unfit" to be president while he, Haley, Burgum, and Scott defended Pence's actions the day of January 6, refusing directives from Trump to reject certain states' electors. The candidates differed on the issue of abortion, with Scott and Pence supporting a national 15-week ban while Haley called the proposal politically impractical and that states should be left to decide the issue. Observers were largely surprised with Ramaswamy's performance and that he, not poll leader DeSantis, was the target of attacks by other candidates; attacks included his lack of political experience and his promise to grant a presidential pardon to Trump. Ramaswamy's declaration that the "climate change agenda" is a "hoax" also garnered media attention.

Various candidates were cited as the debate's winner. Ramaswamy was cited as the winner by several commentators and outlets, while others selected DeSantis. Others pointed to Pence as the debate's winner, pointing to his successful defense of his actions surrounding January 6 as well as appealing to traditional conservatives on the issues of foreign policy and abortion, while some cited Haley as the winner of the debate, arguing she possessed a relatively calm stance on issues and appealed to moderate voters.

Polls asking watchers who they thought won the debate were similarly split. A FiveThirtyEight/Ipsos/Washington Post survey of Republican voters found that a plurality of debate watchers thought DeSantis won the debate while polls from Emerson, Insider Polling, and Morning Consult found Ramaswamy as the winner. Christie was the most frequently cited as performing the worst in these polls. The FiveThirtyEight poll showed Haley with the largest increase in net favorability while Ramaswamy saw the largest decrease in net favorability, which FiveThirtyEight suggested was due to his combative style. Haley saw the largest increase in the proportion of voters considering, from 30% to 47%, followed by Burgum, DeSantis, and Ramaswamy with more modest increases.

In the RealClearPolitics polling average, Haley saw the largest increase in support during the two weeks following the debate, followed by Pence. Trump, who did not participate, saw the largest decrease in support, followed by Scott. No other candidate's support changed by more than 0.6%.

Candidate	Pre-debate polls (8/23)	Post-debate polls (9/6)	±%
Trump	55.4%	53.6%	-1.8%
DeSantis	14.3%	14.9%	+0.6%
Ramaswamy	7.2%	6.8%	-0.4%
Pence	4.0%	4.9%	+0.9%
Haley	3.2%	6.1%	+2.9%
Scott	3.1%	2.1%	-1.0%
Christie	3.0%	2.8%	-0.2%
Hutchinson	0.8%	0.5%	-0.3%
Burgum	0.6%	0.5%	-0.1%

Candidates	Speaking time	
Candidates	CNN	NYT
Pence	12:26	12:37
Ramaswamy	11:38	11:47
Christie	11:37	11:22
DeSantis	10:01	10:22
Haley	8:20	8:41
Scott	7:57	8:15
Burgum	7:50	8:00
Hutchinson	7:24	7:33

== Second debate ==
Qualified candidates for the second debate
Candidate	Met donor criterion	Met polling criteria (per Politico)		Signed loyalty pledge	Met all three criteria/ invited	Additional ref(s)
Candidate	Met donor criterion	National polls	State polls	Signed loyalty pledge	Met all three criteria/ invited	Additional ref(s)
Burgum	Yes	Yes (1 qualifying poll)	Yes (3 qualifying polls from 2 states)	Yes	Yes	
Christie	Yes	Yes (16 qualifying polls)	Yes (9 qualifying polls from 3 states)	Yes	Yes	
DeSantis	Yes	Yes (18 qualifying polls)	Yes (10 qualifying polls from 3 states)	Yes	Yes	
Haley	Yes	Yes (18 qualifying polls)	Yes (9 qualifying polls from 3 states)	Yes	Yes	
Pence	Yes	Yes (18 qualifying polls)	Yes (7 qualifying polls from 3 states)	Yes	Yes	
Ramaswamy	Yes	Yes (18 qualifying polls)	Yes (10 qualifying polls from 3 states)	Yes	Yes	
Scott	Yes	Yes (13 qualifying polls)	Yes (10 qualifying polls from 3 states)	Yes	Yes	
Trump	Yes	Yes (18 qualifying polls)	Yes (10 qualifying polls from 3 states)	No	No	
Hutchinson	No (at least 46,000)	Yes (1 qualifying poll)	No (0 qualifying polls)	Yes	No	
Elder	Yes	No (0 qualifying polls)	No (0 qualifying polls)	Yes	No	
Johnson	Yes	No (0 qualifying polls)	No (0 qualifying polls)	Yes	No	
Hurd	Yes	No (0 qualifying polls)	No (1 qualifying poll from 1 state)	No	No	
Suarez	No (at least 40,000)	No (0 qualifying polls)	No (0 qualifying polls)	Yes	No	
Withdrawn candidate

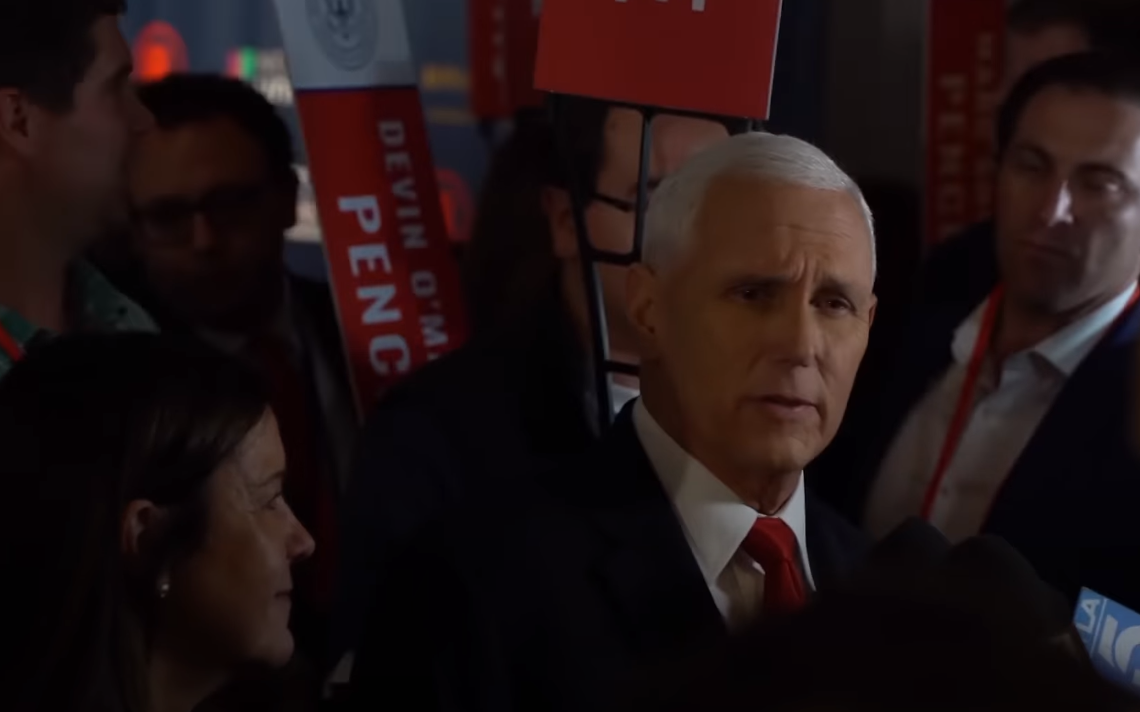
Mike Pence speaking to the press following the 2nd debate.

The second Republican primary debate was held on September 27, 2023, in Simi Valley, California, at the Ronald Reagan Presidential Library and hosted by Fox Business, Rumble and Univision. It was moderated by Stuart Varney, Dana Perino and Ilia Calderón.

=== Criteria ===
On August 1, 2023, the RNC announced the criteria for the second debate.

1. Sign a pledge to support the eventual nominee.
2. Prove to the RNC that they have polled above three percent in August or September in at least two national polls. Otherwise, one national poll plus two state polls in two separate early primary states (Iowa, New Hampshire, Nevada, or South Carolina) also qualify. The polls must survey "at least 800 registered likely Republican voters", cannot be affiliated with a candidate and must be provided to the RNC by the September 25 deadline.
3. Prove to the RNC that they have attracted donations from at least 50,000 individuals, with at least 200 from each of 20 states or territories.

Six candidates unofficially qualified for the debate on August 15, according to Politico: Trump, DeSantis, Ramaswamy, Haley, Scott, Christie. Pence unofficially qualified three days later.

Francis Suarez suspended his campaign between the first and second debates, on August 29.

On September 18, Trump announced he would not participate. Instead, as with the first debate, he aired his own simultaneous television event in competition with the debate.

On September 23, NBC News and Politico both reported that Burgum unofficially qualified for the second debate.

As of September 23, 28 polls qualified for the second debate according to Politico's analysis: 18 national polls, four from New Hampshire, four from Iowa, and two from South Carolina. However, the RNC has not confirmed this number, and a Victory Insights poll that appeared to qualify was disqualified.

On September 25, the RNC invited seven candidates to the second debate: Burgum, Christie, DeSantis, Haley, Pence, Ramaswamy, and Scott.

=== Summary ===
Reporters on Politico's panel largely viewed Scott as the winner of the debate. The New York Times opinion section writers rated Haley as the best performing and Pence as the worst performing on average, although no candidate received an average score of 5.0/10 or higher.

A FiveThirtyEight poll of debate watchers showed that a plurality (33%) thought that DeSantis won the debate, followed by Haley. Christie was most frequently cited as the loser, followed by Pence. In terms of the share of voters considering a candidate, Burgum saw the biggest increase (+3.4) followed by Haley and Scott. No other participating candidate saw their proportion of voters considering change by more than one percent in either direction.

Haley had the biggest increase in support in the RealClearPolitics polling average in the two weeks following the debate, while DeSantis saw the biggest decrease. No other participating candidate's support changed by more than one percent in either direction.

Candidates	Speaking time	
Candidates	CNN	NYT
Ramaswamy	12:30	11:53
DeSantis	12:08	12:27
Scott	11:21	10:42
Christie	10:27	10:32
Haley	10:22	9:05
Pence	9:38	9:35
Burgum	7:39	7:35

Candidate	Pre-debate polls (9/27)	Post-debate polls (10/11)	±%
Trump	56.6%	57.8%	+1.2%
DeSantis	14.4%	12.8%	-1.6%
Haley	5.8%	7.3%	+1.5%
Ramaswamy	5.1%	6.0%	+0.9%
Pence	4.2%	3.5%	-0.7%
Scott	2.8%	2.3%	-0.5%
Christie	2.7%	2.6%	-0.1%
Burgum	0.9%	0.8%	-0.1%

== Third debate ==
Qualified candidates for the third debate
Candidate	Met donor criterion	Met polling criteria (per Politico)		Signed loyalty pledge	Met all three criteria/ invited	Additional ref(s)
Candidate	Met donor criterion	National polls	State polls	Signed loyalty pledge	Met all three criteria/ invited	Additional ref(s)
Christie	Yes	Yes (2 qualifying polls)	Yes (6 qualifying polls from 3 states)	Yes	Yes	
DeSantis	Yes	Yes (15 qualifying polls)	Yes (8 qualifying polls from 3 states)	Yes	Yes	
Haley	Yes	Yes (15 qualifying polls)	Yes (8 qualifying polls from 3 states)	Yes	Yes	
Ramaswamy	Yes	Yes (14 qualifying polls)	Yes (7 qualifying polls from 3 states)	Yes	Yes	
Scott	Yes	Yes (1 qualifying poll)	Yes (7 qualifying polls from 3 states)	Yes	Yes	
Trump	Yes	Yes (15 qualifying polls)	Yes (8 qualifying polls from 3 states)	No	No	
Burgum	Yes	No (0 qualifying polls)	Yes (2 qualifying polls from 2 states)	Yes	No	
Hutchinson	No (at least 46,000)	No (0 qualifying polls)	No (0 qualifying polls)	Yes	No	
Pence	No (at least 50,000)	Yes (12 qualifying polls)	No (1 qualifying poll from 1 state) (Note: Pence would have bypassed the state qualifying poll path by having two or more national qualifying polls but dropped out of the race.)	Yes	No	
Elder	No (at least 50,000)	No (0 qualifying polls)	No (0 qualifying polls)	Yes	No	
Johnson	No (at least 50,000)	No (0 qualifying polls)	No (0 qualifying polls)	Yes	No	
Hurd	No (at least 50,000)	No (0 qualifying polls)	No (0 qualifying polls)	No	No	
Withdrawn candidate

The third Republican primary debate was held on November 8, 2023, in Miami, Florida at the Arsht Center, and hosted by NBC, Salem Radio Network, the Republican Jewish Coalition and Rumble. It was moderated by Lester Holt, Kristen Welker and Hugh Hewitt.

=== Criteria ===
The criteria for the third debate included:

1. 70,000 unique donors, including 200 donors in 20 or more states
2. Four percent in two national polls or four percent in one national poll and four percent in two separate statewide polls in Iowa, New Hampshire, Nevada, or South Carolina (provided to the RNC by November 6)
3. Sign the loyalty pledge to support the eventual Republican nominee and not to participate in any non-RNC sanctioned debates for the rest of the 2024 election cycle

On September 14, 2023, CNN claimed that the third Republican presidential debate will be held in Miami, Florida in early November 2023. An RNC spokesman confirmed the Miami location to Politico the same day. On September 22, CNN confirmed that the third debate would take place on November 8.

Earlier, there was speculation that the third debate would have been held sometime in October 2023, in Alabama, according to Haley; Christie later said the third debate will be in Tuscaloosa, Alabama. Four unnamed RNC sources told The Dispatch that the University of Alabama would host the third debate in "late October or early November". Alabama Republican Party chair John Wahl said he could not comment on whether or not Alabama would host a presidential debate, though he was supportive of the idea and said that the party would have to "wait and see". Ultimately the fourth debate is scheduled be held on December 6 in Tuscaloosa.

Trump did not attend the third debate and instead held a rally in Hialeah that same night.

On September 22, Politico reported that DeSantis, Haley, Ramaswamy, and Trump unofficially met the polling and donor qualifications for the third debate.

Christie and Ramaswamy attempted to hold a debate on Bret Baier's Fox News show on October 3, but after the RNC warned that both candidates would be disqualified from the third debate should they participate, the two agreed to partake in separate interviews instead.

Will Hurd suspended his campaign between the second and third debates, on October 9.

Ramaswamy spokeswoman Tricia McLaughlin claimed on October 20 that he may skip the third debate.

Perry Johnson withdrew from the race on October 20.

On October 22, Politico reported that Scott's campaign believes, based on a discussion with the RNC, that a "little-noticed poll" satisfies the polling requirements for the debate. Scott still needed to pass the 70,000 donor threshold.

On October 23, Burgum announced he had received donations from the required number of donors, though he had not met the polling threshold.

Christie's campaign announced on October 24 that he met the donor threshold and unofficially qualified for the debate, as he had already met the polling criteria.

Larry Elder withdrew on October 26.

On October 28, Pence announced his withdrawal from the presidential race.

Tim Scott's campaign claimed on October 31 that he qualified for the third debate.

23 polls qualified for the third debate according to Politico's tracker: 15 national polls, three each from New Hampshire and Iowa, and two from South Carolina.

On November 6, the RNC invited five candidates to the third debate: Christie, DeSantis, Haley, Ramaswamy, and Scott.

=== Summary ===
The debate was largely described as more substantive than previous debates, and many headlines following the debate focused on the combative exchanges between Haley and Ramaswamy, including Ramaswamy calling Haley, "Dick Cheney in three-inch heels", though Haley responded by correcting him that she wore "... five-inch heels ... not for a fashion statement [but] for ammunition.", Ramaswamy criticizing her daughter's use of TikTok, to which Haley retaliated yelling, "Leave my daughter out of your voice!", and calling Ramaswamy "scum". The New York Times editorial board voted Haley as performing the best in the debate and Ramaswamy as performing the worst. Similarly, a FiveThirtyEight/Ipsos poll of debate watchers found a plurality rating Haley as a winner and Ramaswamy as the loser. Haley saw the largest increase in proportion of voters considering while DeSantis saw the largest decrease. A CNN opinion article labeled Christie as an ‘underdog’ and praised him for answering the moderators’ questions more directly and for acknowledging Trump's legal issues. Most of Politico's panel agreed that Haley "had the best night" (while Adam Wren believed it was Christie), while they generally thought that the debate was unlikely to move the needle.

Building America's Future ran an ad during the debate which claimed that an “E-ZPass lane for whales in the Gulf” implemented by Joe Biden was responsible for high gas prices.

Haley and DeSantis reported donations of more than a million dollars, respectively, 24 hours after the debate.

Haley saw the largest increase in polling of participating candidates in the two weeks following the debate, as she did following each of the first two debates. DeSantis saw the biggest decrease in support, as he also did following the second debate. Christie and Ramaswamy saw little change in their polling, while Trump, who did not participate, saw an increase in support larger than any of the participating candidates.

Candidates	Speaking time	
Candidates	CNN	NYT
Scott	18:55	18:55
Haley	18:02	17:50
Ramaswamy	17:37	17:27
DeSantis	16:19	16:36
Christie	16:15	16:15

Candidate	Pre-debate polls (11/8)	Post-debate polls (11/22)	±%
Trump	58.3%	59.8%	+1.5%
DeSantis	14.6%	13.5%	-1.1%
Haley	9.4%	10.5%	+1.1%
Ramaswamy	4.4%	4.7%	+0.3%
Christie	2.6%	2.5%	-0.1%
Scott	2.6%	NA (Note: Scott suspended his campaign on November 12.)	NA

== Fourth debate ==
Qualified candidates for the fourth debate
Candidate	Met donor criterion	Met polling criteria (per Politico)		Signed loyalty pledge	Met all three criteria/ invited	Additional ref(s)
Candidate	Met donor criterion	National polls	State polls	Signed loyalty pledge	Met all three criteria/ invited	Additional ref(s)
DeSantis	Yes	Yes (19 qualifying polls)	Yes (4 qualifying polls from 3 states)	Yes	Yes	
Haley	Yes	Yes (16 qualifying polls)	Yes (4 qualifying polls from 3 states)	Yes	Yes	
Christie	Yes	Yes (2 qualifying polls)	No (2 qualifying polls from 1 state) (Note: Candidate bypasses the state polling path by having multiple national qualifying polls.)	Yes	Yes	
Ramaswamy	Yes	Yes (14 qualifying polls)	No (1 qualifying poll from 1 state)	Yes	Yes	
Trump	Yes	Yes (19 qualifying polls)	Yes (4 qualifying polls from 3 states)	No	No	
Hutchinson	No (at least 46,000)	No (0 qualifying polls)	No (0 qualifying polls from 0 states)	Yes	No	
Burgum	Yes	No (0 qualifying polls)	No (0 qualifying polls from 0 states)	Yes	No	
Scott	No (at least 70,000)	No (0 qualifying polls)	Yes (2 qualifying polls from 2 states)	Yes	No	
Withdrawn candidate

The University of Alabama's Moody Music Hall was the venue for the fourth Republican primary debate

The fourth Republican primary debate was held on December 6, 2023, in Tuscaloosa, Alabama at the University of Alabama's Moody Music Hall. It was moderated by Megyn Kelly, Elizabeth Vargas and Eliana Johnson.

On November 3, Geoffrey Skelley of FiveThirtyEight reported that DeSantis, Haley, Ramaswamy, and Trump had met the polling and donor requirements for the debate.

Trump's "top aide", Chris LaCivita, told reporters shortly after the Hialeah rally ended on November 8 that Trump would not attend the fourth debate.

Tim Scott dropped out on November 12.

On November 15, Christie claimed that he had met both the donor and polling requirement for the debate in an interview with radio host Hugh Hewitt.

On December 3, Burgum claimed he had 90,000 donors, but he withdrew the following day.

There were 23 qualifying polls according to Politico's tracker: 19 national polls, two New Hampshire polls, and one poll each from Iowa and South Carolina.

On December 4, the RNC invited four candidates to the fourth debate: Christie, DeSantis, Haley and Ramaswamy.

=== Criteria ===
The criteria for the fourth debate included:

1. A minimum of 80,000 unique donors, with at least 200 donors from each of 20 or more states and territories.
2. Six percent in two national polls or six percent in one national poll and six percent in two separate statewide polls in Iowa, New Hampshire, Nevada, or South Carolina (polls must be conducted on or after September 15 and submitted to the RNC by December 4).
3. Sign the loyalty pledge to support the eventual Republican nominee and not to participate in any non-RNC sanctioned debates for the rest of the 2024 election cycle.

=== Summary ===
The debate was described as largely having Haley on the defensive from the other candidates, with Trump again escaping significant criticism from all candidates except Christie. Business was a significant issue, as DeSantis and Ramaswamy criticized Haley's corporate backing. Ramaswamy then, in what the Associated Press termed a "capitalist contradiction", went on to argue for less government regulations on businesses. Rights for transgender people was also a significant issue, with DeSantis chiding Haley and, according to the Associated Press, "insisting he did more to crack down on transgender rights than anyone on stage". Ramaswamy continued to attack Haley for alleged corruption, at one point holding up a notepad with the phrase "NIKKI = CORRUPT." Other questions in the debate included sending troops to rescue American hostages taken by Hamas as a result of the Gaza war, sending American troops to fight in the Russo-Ukraine War, illegal immigration, the fentanyl crisis, and whether the United States should intervene if China invaded Taiwan.

By arrangement of the Republican National Committee, two questions about improving the reputation of the Justice Department and ensuring the legitimacy of elections were asked by Tom Fitton of Judicial Watch, which drew criticism as Fitton is an unindicted co-conspirator in the Georgia election racketeering prosecution.

Reporters on Politico's panel were largely mixed in determining who the winner of the debate was, but all agreed that this debate did not have a negative effect on Donald Trump.

The New York Times opinion section writers rated Christie as the best performing candidate, with an average score of 6.6/10. This was the first debate in which the opinion section named a winner other than Haley. Sarah Isgur described Christie as "at his very best". Ramaswamy received the lowest average score of 2.0/10, the second straight debate in which he received the lowest score. Jamelle Bouie described him as "a clown, and not even one of the good ones" and Peter Wehner described Ramaswamy as a "smear merchant".

A FiveThirtyEight/ABC/Ipsos poll of debate watchers found a plurality of Republican voters thought that DeSantis was the winner, as the same poll reported for the first two debates. Ramaswamy was most frequently cited as the loser, as he was for the third debate. Christie saw the biggest increase in percentage considering following the debate. Haley and DeSantis saw the largest decrease in percentage considering, although this portion of the poll included Republicans who did not watch the debate. Christie also saw the largest increase in net favorability while Ramaswamy saw the largest decrease.

While viewership for this debate was the lowest of all four Republican debates, it was the most viewed program ever on NewsNation and highest rated program on The CW since 2018, drawing 4.21 million viewers with the two networks, along with approximately 400,000 viewers on Nexstar's digital platforms.

Of participating candidates, Haley saw the largest increase in support in the two weeks following the debate, as she had in all three previous debates. However, Trump saw a significantly larger increase despite not participating. DeSantis saw the biggest decrease in support, as he did following the second and third debates.

Candidates	Speaking time
Candidates	CNN
DeSantis	21:08
Haley	17:28
Ramaswamy	22:36
Christie	16:52

Candidate	Pre-debate polls (12/6)	Post-debate polls (12/20)	±%
Trump	61.0%	63.8%	+2.8%
DeSantis	13.5%	11.6%	-1.9%
Haley	10.3%	10.8%	+0.5%
Ramaswamy	4.9%	4.3%	-0.6%
Christie	2.5%	2.7%	+0.2%

== Fifth debate ==
Qualified candidates for the Iowa debate
Candidate	Met polling criteria (per FiveThirtyEight)		Invited	Attended	Additional ref(s)
Candidate	Total polls	Iowa polls	Invited	Attended	Additional ref(s)
DeSantis	Yes (14 qualifying polls)	Yes (3 qualifying polls)	Yes	Yes	
Haley	Yes (11 qualifying polls)	Yes (3 qualifying polls)	Yes	Yes	
Trump	Yes (15 qualifying polls)	Yes (3 qualifying polls)	Yes	No	
Hutchinson	No (0 qualifying polls)	No (0 qualifying polls)	No	No	
Ramaswamy	No (0 qualifying polls)	No (0 qualifying polls)	No	No	
Christie	No (0 qualifying polls)	No (0 qualifying polls)	No	No	
Withdrawn candidate

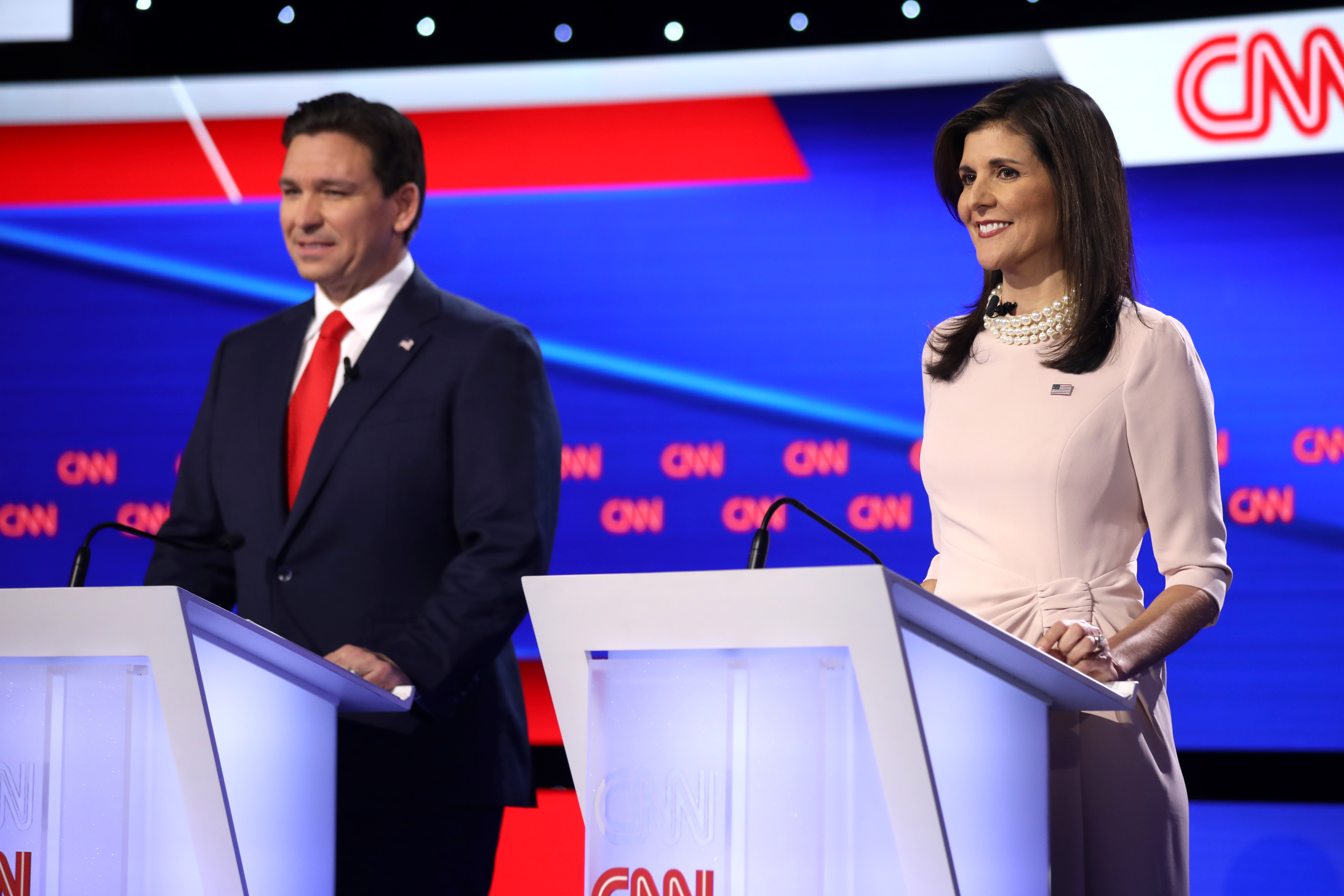
Ron DeSantis and Nikki Haley at the CNN Republican Presidential Debate in Des Moines, Iowa.

The fifth Republican primary debate took place in Des Moines, Iowa on January 10, 2024, and was hosted by CNN and moderated by Jake Tapper and Dana Bash.

DeSantis commented on Twitter that he was "looking forward to debating in Iowa." Haley was initially "noncommittal" about attending the debate, though she confirmed on December 15 that she would attend it.

Trump, DeSantis, and Haley qualified for the debate. Trump declined to participate, opting instead to hold a competing town hall with Fox News. Ramaswamy, podcast host Tim Pool and conservative commentator Candace Owens held a competing live podcast at Ramaswamy's headquarters in Des Moines.

=== Criteria ===
The criteria for the fifth debate included:

1. Candidates must agree to the rules and the format of the debate.
2. Candidates must have three national and/or Iowa polls (with a minimum of one of the three being a likely voter poll from Iowa) at 10% without rounding from the following list of approved pollsters: CNN, CNN/University of New Hampshire, Fox News, Marquette University Law School, Monmouth University, Monmouth University/The Washington Post, NBC News, NBC News/Des Moines Register/Mediacom, Quinnipiac University, CBS News/YouGov, Marist College, The New York Times/Siena College, The Wall Street Journal and The Washington Post/ABC News.
3. The polls must be conducted on or after October 15 and must be published by January 2.

=== Summary ===
Candidate	Pre-debate Iowa polls (1/10)	Final Iowa results	±%
Trump	52.5%	51.0%	-1.5%
Haley	17.5%	19.1%	+1.6%
DeSantis	15.8%	21.2%	+5.4%

Reactions to the debate were mixed, with many criticizing its divisiveness. The New York Times Opinion section rated Haley as the winner as they did in three of the first four debates. The BBC noted that the candidates attacked each other almost immediately, while they were more outspoken in their criticism of Trump. The Russian invasion of Ukraine was another area where the candidates disagreed. In The Des Moines Register's review of the debate, political science professor Sara Mitchell of the University of Iowa noted that policy debate often gave way to personal attacks.

== Ratings ==
The following table lists the ratings (number of estimated viewers) of the debates to date.

Debate	Date	Viewers	Network
1	August 23, 2023	12.8 million–13 million	Fox News
2	September 27, 2023	9.5 million	Fox Business Univision
3	November 8, 2023	7.5 million	NBC News
4	December 6, 2023	4.1 million (Note: 1.6 million (NewsNation) 2.5 million (The CW))	NewsNation; The CW
5	January 10, 2024	2.6 million	CNN

== Canceled debates ==
=== January 18, 2024 – Goffstown, New Hampshire ===
ABC had scheduled a sixth debate to take place in Goffstown, New Hampshire at St. Anselm College on January 18, 2024, to be hosted by ABC and local New Hampshire ABC affiliate WMUR-TV. Trump, DeSantis, Haley, and Christie qualified for the debate, according to ABC. However, Christie dropped out of the race on January 10 and both Trump and Haley refused to participate, leading ABC to cancel the debate on January 16.

=== January 21, 2024 – Henniker, New Hampshire ===
CNN had scheduled a seventh debate to take place in Henniker, New Hampshire, at New England College on January 21, 2024. Trump, DeSantis, Haley, and Christie qualified for the debate, according to ABC News. However, Christie dropped out of the race on January 10 and Haley and Trump refused to attend, leading CNN to cancel the debate on January 17.

== Controversies ==
=== Questioning of purpose of debates without Trump ===
The core purpose of the Republican debates was questioned, as they were conducted without the presence of Donald Trump, who held a clear lead before and during the debates. Some anonymous RNC officials have described the debates as "embarrassing" for not having Trump.

=== First debate qualification controversy ===
The first scheduled debate participants were listed in an RNC press release on August 21, 2023. Eight candidates qualified according to RNC Chairwoman Ronna McDaniel although three other candidates also claimed they had qualified (Elder, Johnson and Suarez).

No initial explanation was given as to why Johnson, who had qualified according to Politico’s analysis, or Suarez, who claimed he qualified, had been excluded, though it was later indicated that one of the polls from Victory Insights, which Johnson had used to count towards his total, was discarded as it "only surveyed voters in 38 states". Elder and Johnson announced on August 22 that they would sue the RNC as a result of being excluded. Hurd, who also failed to make the debate stage, strongly criticized the RNC.

After the RNC press release was publicized, Suarez acknowledged that he did not qualify for the debate. Johnson and Elder disputed the RNC debate participant list and contended that they had qualified.

Politico launched its own tracker for debate qualification in March. The methodology and requirements for polling were considered to be unclear by many and created areas of discrepancy. Politico argued that campaigns and pollsters found the polling requirements to be vague and could be used to eliminate seemingly qualified candidates; the RNC did not respond to questions from Politico regarding the polling requirements. According to their tracker and analysis of the polling data, Johnson qualified for the first debate; he issued a press release detailing the timeline, sequence of events, and correspondence with the RNC and his campaign.

Johnson stated on August 21 that he will still go to Milwaukee to attend the debate. Ultimately, neither Elder or Johnson were invited or attended the debate. NBC correspondent Dasha Burns posted a picture on social media that was on the security desk that detailed who was not allowed at the debate venue. This included Elder and his campaign, three Trump staffers (Jason Miller, Justin Caparole and Danny Tiso) and Vivek Ramaswamy campaign credentials. Fox News clarified that it was not involved with the "production of the document" and "did not sanction" the wording.

McDaniel defended the criteria, stating that "they were applied ... equally to every candidate", as did Keith Schipper, an RNC spokesman.

=== New Hampshire scheduling controversy ===
The RNC has warned the New Hampshire state party that if it proceeds with moving the 2024 New Hampshire Republican presidential primary ahead of the 2024 Iowa Republican presidential caucuses, a presidential debate will not be held there. The New Hampshire primary was not subsequently moved.

=== Tim Scott third debate qualification controversy ===
Up until the final deadline for qualifying, neither the New York Times nor Politico confirmed a qualifying national poll where Senator Tim Scott had attained four percent support. However, Scott's campaign insisted that a "little-noticed" poll conducted in September by YouGov for progressive outlet The Liberal Patriot had him at four percent support. FiveThirtyEight believed that the poll would not qualify as the screening question used for determining likely primary voters "resulted in the survey including a large number of Democrats in the sample". However, the RNC ultimately decided to count the poll.

=== Family Leader Foundation forum controversy ===
The RNC, on November 11, initially threatened to disqualify candidates from participating in future debates if they participated in the Thanksgiving Family Forum that was hosted by the Family Leader Foundation on November 17, which the RNC initially considered to be a debate. The president of the foundation, Bob Vander Plaats, indicated the same day that the RNC would allow the forum to go forward, with no repercussions for candidates who attend. DeSantis, Haley and Ramaswamy attended.

=== Chris Christie fourth debate qualification controversy ===
Christie's campaign announced he met the fundraising threshold on November 13. On November 15, Chris Christie claimed to have met all debate criteria while on The Hugh Hewitt Show. On November 30, prior to the announcement of invitees, Politico reported skepticism of Christie's claims and disputed his polling claims. As of December 5, Politico's polling tracker indicated Christie qualified with two national polls.

Christie claimed on Face the Nation that he was confident that he would qualify and stated on a Fox News Digital interview that he was “100% confident” he would be on stage. Chris Christie likened his situation to Tim Scott's in his third debate qualification bid. While Scott did qualify for the third debate, he dropped out later that week. Ahead of the first debate, Christie stated that anybody not on the debate stage should drop out.

Former White House Chief of Staff Mick Mulvaney told Sky News Australia on December 3 that he was skeptical Christie qualified. On December 4, Axios reported an exclusive look into the fourth debate with pictures of four lecterns on the stage, which was indeed the case during the debates as four candidates appeared. Between November 30 and December 2, a national poll was conducted by the Trafalgar Group where Christie received 6.3%. It is noted on Politico's qualification tracker. On December 4, the RNC invited Christie to the fourth debate.

== Forums ==
In addition to the RNC-sanctioned debates, many private organizations host forums focusing on select issues and candidates. Unlike debates, candidates do not respond directly to each other at forums.

Legend:

- P = Participant
- N = Non-invitee
- A = Absent invitee
- NYD = Not yet declared candidacy
- W = Withdrawn

Forums among candidates for the 2024 Republican Party U.S. presidential nomination
No.	Name	Date and place	Host	Ref	Participants^{*}												
					Burgum	Christie	DeSantis	Elder	Haley	Hurd	Hutchinson	Johnson	Pence	Ramaswamy	Scott	Suarez	Trump
1	Vision '24 Forum	March 18, 2023; N. Charleston, SC	Palmetto Family Council		NYD	NYD	NYD	NYD	P	NYD	P (Note: Individual was not a formal candidate at time of forum attendance.)	N	NYD	P	P	NYD	A
2	NRA-ILA Leadership Forum	April 14, 2023; Indianapolis, IN	NRA Institute for Legislative Action		NYD	NYD	NYD (Note: Appeared in a video message.)	NYD	A	NYD	P	A	P	P	NYD	NYD	P
3	Spring Kick-off Event	April 22, 2023; Clive, IA	Faith and Freedom Coalition		NYD	NYD	NYD	P	A	P	P	P	P	P	P	NYD	A
4	Roast and Ride	June 3, 2023; Des Moines, IA	U.S. Senator Joni Ernst		NYD	NYD	P	P	P	NYD	P	P	P	P	P	NYD	A
5	Road to Majority Policy Conference	June 22, 2023; June 23, 2023; June 24, 2023; Washington, DC	Faith and Freedom Coalition		N	P	P	P	P	P	P	P	P	P	P	P	P
6	Joyful Warriors National Summit	June 30, 2023; July 1, 2023; Philadelphia, PA	Moms for Liberty		N	N	P	N	P	N	P	N	N	P	N	N	P
7	Family Leadership Summit (Note: Other invited guests include Kristi Noem and Democrats Joe Biden and Robert F. Kennedy Jr. (all declined).)	July 14, 2023; Des Moines, IA	The Family Leader		N	N	P	N	P	N	P	N	P	P	P	N	A
8	Lincoln Dinner (Note: Ryan Binkley also attended.)	July 28, 2023; Des Moines, IA	Iowa GOP		P	N	P	P	P	P	P	P	P	P	P	P	P
9	The Gathering	August 18, 2023; Atlanta, GA	Erick Erickson		N	P	P	N	P	N	N	N	P	P	P	N	N
10	Iowa Faith and Freedom Coalition banquet	September 16, 2023; Des Moines, IA	Faith and Freedom Coalition		N	N	P	P	P	P	P	P	P	P	P	W	N
11	First in the Nation Leadership Summit	October 13, 2023; October 14, 2023; Nashua, NH	New Hampshire GOP		P	P	P	N	P	W	P	P	P	P	P	W	N
12	Republican Jewish Coalition Conference	October 28, 2023; Las Vegas, NV	Republican Jewish Coalition		P	P	P	W	P	W	N	W	P (Note: Pence announced in his speech that he was suspending his campaign)	P	P	W	P
13	Florida Freedom Summit	November 4, 2023; Kissimmee, FL	Florida Republican Party		P	P	P	W	A	W	P	W	W	P	P	W	P
14	Thanksgiving Family Forum	November 17, 2023; Des Moines, IA	The Family Leader		N	N	P	W	P	W	N	W	W	P	W	W	A
15	Faith and Family with the Feenstras	December 9, 2023; Sioux Center, IA	U.S. Rep. Randy Feenstra		W	N	P	W	P	W	N	W	W	P	W	W	N

The Iowa Brown and Black Forum was initially scheduled for January 13, 2024, but was cancelled after a lack of responses.

== See also ==
- 2024 Republican Party presidential primaries
- 2024 Democratic Party presidential debates and forums
