= 2024 Democratic Party presidential debates and forums =

US presidential debates

Several debates and forums took place among candidates in the campaign for the Democratic Party's nomination for president in the 2024 United States presidential election, which were sponsored by private organizations, rather than the party. The Democratic National Committee expressed full support for incumbent president Joe Biden with no primary debates. Although initially adamant that he would remain in the race, Biden ultimately withdrew from the race on July 21 and immediately endorsed Vice President Kamala Harris, who official became the party's presidential nominee on August 5. Harris selected Tim Walz, the governor of Minnesota, as her running mate.

== Background ==
Joe Biden was elected president of the United States after defeating Republican nominee Donald Trump in 2020. While Biden had repeatedly expressed his intent to run for re-election since 2021, there was speculation in the first two years of his presidency that he might not seek re-election due to his age and low approval ratings. After Democrats outperformed expectations in the 2022 midterm elections, many believed the chances that Biden would run for and win his party's nomination had increased, and on April 25, 2023, Biden announced that he would run for re-election. On July 21, 2024, Biden suspended his re-election campaign.

Several candidates had challenged Biden in the primary election. Author Marianne Williamson declared her candidacy in March 2023, which was followed by attorney and conspiracy theorist Robert F. Kennedy Jr. in April and Representative Dean Phillips in October. Kennedy withdrew from the Democratic primaries in October 2023 to run as an independent candidate. Cenk Uygur, a founder of The Young Turks, announced a campaign in October 2023 despite not being eligible for the presidency.

=== Biden's participation ===
Despite no incumbent president ever having participated in a primary season debate, a June 2023 poll by USA Today and Suffolk University found that 8 in 10 Democratic voters wanted to see Biden debate the other Democratic candidates. Among Biden supporters, 72% said they would like to see him debate in the primaries with other Democratic candidates. The Democratic National Committee expressed no support for hosting any official primary debates. Williamson criticized this decision as "rigging" and "candidate suppression."

== Debates ==
The first debate was hosted by New England College on January 8, 2024. A second event (described as both a debate and a forum), hosted by Dan Abrams on NewsNation, took place on January 12, 2024.

Debates featuring at least two major candidates are included in the following table.

=== Schedule ===
Debates among candidates for the 2024 Democratic Party U.S. presidential nomination
No.	Date	Place	Host	Participants			
P Participant. I Invitee. A Absent. N Not Invited				Biden	Phillips	Williamson	Uygur
1	January 8, 2024	Manchester, New Hampshire	New England College	N (Note: Did not qualify due to not being on the ballot in New Hampshire.)	P	P	N
2	January 12, 2024	New York City, New York	NewsNation	A	P	P	P

=== January 8, 2024 – Manchester, New Hampshire ===
On January 8, 2024, Williamson and Phillips participated in a debate hosted by New England College in Manchester, New Hampshire. The debate was broadcast on satellite radio by SiriusXM and was moderated by Josh McElveen, who was the former political director of WMUR.

==== Criteria ====
To qualify, candidates needed to be registered on the New Hampshire primary ballot and poll at more than five percent. As Biden did not file for the New Hampshire primary ballot in deference to Democratic National Committee (DNC) rules changing the primary calendar, (Note: Allies of Biden are running a write-in campaign.) he was not invited to the debate, and instead gave a campaign speech in South Carolina discussing white supremacy and attacking Republican frontrunner Donald Trump.

==== Summary ====
The two candidates spent most of the debate attacking Biden and the DNC, rather than each other. At one point, the moderator had to interject to get the candidates to draw contrasts with each other on stage. Both candidates criticized several state Democratic parties for actions taken to make it more difficult for them to get on the ballot. Both candidates also indicated support for student debt cancellation and opposition to removing Donald Trump from the ballot. Phillips invoked Biden's poll numbers to try to argue that he would be unable to defeat Trump in a general election. Williamson criticized Phillips for not supporting Medicare for All until two months after he had started his campaign and not taking any action on it in Congress, and described focusing on Trump as a distraction.

Reactions to the debate were mixed. Politico described it as a dud, while many attendees surveyed by USA Today said they liked what they heard. Both newspapers agreed that the debate would likely be inconsequential to the primary.

=== January 12, 2024 - New York City, New York ===
On January 12, 2024, NewsNation recorded a forum in New York City, New York featuring Williamson, Phillips and Uygur. Biden was invited but did not attend. The discussion was moderated by Dan Abrams and aired on his show that night. The event was described as both a forum, debate, and discussion, but candidates were allowed to respond to one another.

=== January 18, 2024 – Minor candidates debate ===
On January 18, 2024, Free & Equal Elections Foundation hosted a debate at Chelsea Television Studios in New York City. The debate was originally planned to be held in Los Angeles. Christina Tobin moderated the debate. All candidates registered for the ballot "in at least four states" were invited: Biden, Phillips, Williamson, Uygur, Gabriel Cornejo, Stephen Lyons, Jason Palmer, and Frank Lozada. However, only the latter four candidates chose to participate.

== Forums ==
=== December 6, 2023 - The Young Turks Forum ===
On December 6, 2023, The Young Turks Network hosted a forum featuring Williamson and Phillips, as well as Uygur. Biden was invited but declined to attend. The candidates responded to the GOP debate being held in Tuscaloosa, which was scheduled to end at the same time. The discussion was moderated by John Iadarola, the main host of The Damage Report on the same network.

=== January 19, 2024 - New Hampshire forum ===
Phillips and Williamson were part of a forum held at the Artisan Hotel in Tuscan Village, Salem, New Hampshire. It was hosted by the Rotary Club and the Southern New Hampshire Chamber of Commerce.

== See also ==
- 2024 Democratic Party presidential primaries
- 2024 Republican Party presidential debates and forums
