= List of Live with Kelly and Mark episodes =

Live with Kelly and Mark is the 2023–present title of a long-running American syndicated morning talk show. Kelly Ripa and Mark Consuelos are the hosts in that period.

== Season 35 (2023) ==
=== April 2023 ===
Date	Co-hosts	"Host Chat"	Guests/Segments	"Kelly and Mark's Inbox"
April 17	Kelly Ripa & Mark Consuelos	Yes	Rozonda Thomas, Char Margolis, Memorable Mark Moments	No
April 18	Kelly Ripa & Mark Consuelos	Yes	Scott Foley, LIVE's It Takes Two Week - Jive Dance Lesson with Jenna Johnson & Val Chmerkovskiy	Yes
April 19	Kelly Ripa & Mark Consuelos	Yes	Ray Romano, J. Smith-Cameron, LIVE's It Takes Two Week - Partner Yoga	No
April 20	Kelly Ripa & Mark Consuelos	Yes	Jane Krakowski, Green Bargains, LIVE's It Takes Two Week - Guinness World Record Attempt	Yes
April 21	Kelly Ripa & Mark Consuelos	Yes	Sheryl Lee Ralph, Annaleigh Ashford, LIVE's It Takes Two Week - Couples' Therapy	No
April 24	Kelly Ripa & Mark Consuelos	Yes	Nikolaj Coster-Waldau, Ato Essandoh	No
April 25	Kelly Ripa & Mark Consuelos	Yes	Laura Dern & Diane Ladd, Miranda Lambert, LIVE's Spring Has Sprung Week - Steve Patterson Explores New York in Spring	No
April 26	Kelly Ripa & Mark Consuelos	Yes	Amanda Peet, Judy Blume, Lizzy Caplan, LIVE's Spring Has Sprung Week - Spring Health Checklist	No
April 27	Kelly Ripa & Mark Consuelos	Yes	Priyanka Chopra Jonas, Ever Anderson, LIVE's Spring Has Sprung Week - Spring Fashion Trends	No
April 28	Kelly Ripa & Mark Consuelos	Yes	Yara Shahidi, Emilio Estevez, LIVE's Spring Has Sprung Week - Inbox	Yes

=== May 2023 ===
Date	Co-hosts	"Host Chat"	Guests/Segments	"Kelly and Mark's Inbox"
May 1	Kelly Ripa & Mark Consuelos	Yes	Ellie Kemper, Deborah Roberts	Yes
May 2	Kelly Ripa & Mark Consuelos	Yes	James Marsden, Minka Kelly	Yes
May 3	Kelly Ripa & Mark Consuelos	Yes	Chris Pratt, Abby Ryder Fortson, Emily King	No
May 4	Kelly Ripa & Mark Consuelos	Yes	Kathleen Turner, Karen Gillan, Debunking Menopause Myths	No
May 5	Kelly Ripa & Mark Consuelos	Yes	Jennifer Lopez, Lilly Singh, Three-Cheese & Chicken Enchilada Recipe	No
May 8	Kelly Ripa & Mark Consuelos	Yes	Elle Fanning, Omari Hardwick, LIVE's I Love Mom Week - LIVE Staff Mom Makeover	Yes
May 9	Kelly Ripa & Mark Consuelos	Yes	Andy Cohen, Ken Jennings, LIVE's I Love Mom Week - Kelly & Lola	Yes
May 10	Kelly Ripa & Mark Consuelos	Yes	Sylvester Stallone & Family, LIVE's I Love Mom Week - Laurie & Misha Gelman	Yes
May 11	Kelly Ripa & Mark Consuelos	Yes	Ludacris, Ed Sheeran, Bear Grylls, LIVE's I Love Mom Week - LIVE Staff Mom Makeover	Yes
May 12	Kelly Ripa & Mark Consuelos	Yes	Michael J. Fox, Andrew McCarthy, LIVE's I Love Mom Week - Mom Quiz	No
May 15	Kelly Ripa & Mark Consuelos	Yes	Awkwafina, Rainn Wilson	Yes
May 16	Kelly Ripa & Mark Consuelos	Yes	Joel McHale, Alfonso Ribiero	Yes
May 17	Kelly Ripa & Mark Consuelos	Yes	Wilmer Valderrama, Chandra Wilson, Summer Ready Bargains	No
May 18	Kelly Ripa & Mark Consuelos	Yes	Ryan Seacrest, Halle Bailey	Yes
May 19	Kelly Ripa & Mark Consuelos	Yes	Daveed Diggs, Christine Taylor, Spring Cleaning Your Mind	Yes
May 22	Kelly Ripa & Mark Consuelos	Yes	Julia Louis-Dreyfus, Leslie Bibb	Yes
May 23	Kelly Ripa & Mark Consuelos	Yes	Vanessa Williams, Iam Tongi	Yes
May 24	Kelly Ripa & Mark Consuelos	Yes	Hailee Steinfeld, Michael Urie	Yes
May 25	Kelly Ripa & Mark Consuelos	Yes	Jessica Chastain, Megan Danielle, Minimum Exercises for Maximum Results	No
May 26	Kelly Ripa & Mark Consuelos	Yes	Sebastian Maniscalco, Job Hunting Strategies, LIVE's Foodfluencer Friday Face-Off: International Edition - Eitan Bernath	No
May 29	Kelly Ripa & Mark Consuelos	Yes	Bethenny Frankel, LIVE's Get Ready for Summer Week - Chris Byrne	Yes
May 30	Kelly Ripa & Mark Consuelos	Yes	Josh Groban, Ronald Gladden, Colin Stough, LIVE's Get Ready for Summer Week - Summer Travel Tips	Yes
May 31	Kelly Ripa & Mark Consuelos	Yes	Rupert Friend, LIVE's Get Ready for Summer Week - Tips for Fun in the Sun	Yes

=== June 2023 ===
Date	Co-hosts	"Host Chat"	Guests/Segments	"Kelly and Mark's Inbox"
June 1	Kelly Ripa & Mark Consuelos	Yes	Brooke Shields, Jimmy Chin, LIVE's Get Ready for Summer Week - Summer Shortcuts	No
June 2	Kelly Ripa & Mark Consuelos	Yes	Amanda Seyfried, LIVE's Get Ready for Summer Week - Tick Prevention Tips, LIVE's Foodfluencer Friday Face-Off: International Edition - Alex Guarnaschelli	No
June 5	Kelly Ripa & Mark Consuelos	Yes	Adrien Brody, Dominique Fishback, Scripps Spelling Bee Winner Dev Shah	No
June 6	Kelly Ripa & Mark Consuelos	Yes	Natasha Lyonne, Mädchen Amick	Yes
June 7	Kelly Ripa & Mark Consuelos	Yes	Caitríona Balfe, Young Mazino, Jake Shears	Yes
June 8	Kelly Ripa & Mark Consuelos	Yes	Anthony Ramos, Maitreyi Ramakrishnan, Mason Parris	No
June 9	Kelly Ripa & Mark Consuelos	Yes	Mary J. Blige, Daniel Wu, LIVE's Foodfluencer Friday Face-Off: International Edition - Corey B	No
June 12	Kelly Ripa & Mark Consuelos	Yes	Tom Holland, Mikey Day	No
June 13	Kelly Ripa & Mark Consuelos	Yes	Gabrielle Union, Jason Alexander, Walk Off the Earth	Yes
June 14	Kelly Ripa & Mark Consuelos	Yes	Matthew Broderick, LIVE's Back 2 Back Bargains, Conor McGregor	Yes
June 15	Kelly Ripa & Mark Consuelos	Yes	Bryan Cranston, LIVE's Back 2 Back Bargains, Idina Menzel	Yes
June 16	Kelly Ripa & Mark Consuelos	Yes	Scarlett Johansson, Steve Patterson, LIVE's Foodfluencer Friday Face-Off: International Edition - Joanne Molinaro	No
June 19	Kelly Ripa & Mark Consuelos	Yes	Jeffrey Dean Morgan, John Leguizamo, Summer Steak Recipe	No
June 26	Kelly Ripa & Mark Consuelos	Yes	Lauren Graham, Bridget Moynahan, Summer Skin Problems	No

=== July 2023 ===
Date	Co-hosts	"Host Chat"	Guests/Segments	"Kelly and Mark's Inbox"
July 3	Kelly Ripa & Mark Consuelos	Yes	Eric McCormack, Fourth of July Party Ideas	Yes
July 4	Kelly Ripa & Mark Consuelos	Yes	LIVE's 4 July Party: Nina Dobrev, Jake Shears, LIVE's Fourth of July Games	Yes
July 5	Kelly Ripa & Mark Consuelos	Yes	Charity Lawson, Bernadette Peters	No
July 6	Kelly Ripa & Mark Consuelos	Yes	Johnny Knoxville, Lola Tung	Yes
July 7	Kelly Ripa & Mark Consuelos	Yes	Patrick Wilson, Juan Archuleta, LIVE's Foodfluencer Friday Face-Off: International Edition - Nick DiGiovanni	No
July 10	Kelly Ripa & Mark Consuelos	Yes	Kim Cattrall, Emily King	Yes
July 11	Kelly Ripa & Mark Consuelos	Yes	Kate McKinnon, Hayley Atwell, Lauren Daigle	No
July 12	Kelly Ripa & Mark Consuelos	Yes	Laura Linney, Vanessa Kirby, LIVE's Beat the Heat Bargains	No
July 13	Mark Consuelos & Andy Cohen	Yes	Ashley Graham, Michelle Buteau, LIVE's Beat the Heat Bargains	No
July 14	Mark Consuelos & Jenny Mollen	Yes	Michael Bolton, LIVE's Beat the Heat Bargains, LIVE's Foodfluencer Friday Face-Off: International Edition - Yumna Jawad	No
July 17	Kelly Ripa & Mark Consuelos	Yes	Sonja Morgan, LIVE's Aches and Pains Week - Knee Pain	Yes
July 18	Kelly Ripa & Mark Consuelos	Yes	David Muir, Steph Curry, LIVE's Aches and Pains Week - Foot Pain	No
July 19	Kelly Ripa & Mark Consuelos	Yes	Steve Guttenberg, LIVE's Aches and Pains Week - Cold Plunge Therapy	No
July 20	Mark Consuelos & Maria Menounos	Yes	Robert Herjavec, Oscar De La Hoya, LIVE's Aches and Pains Week - Tips for Pain Management	Yes
July 21	Mark Consuelos & Maria Menounos	Yes	Bethenny Frankel, LIVE's Aches and Pains Week - Back Pain, LIVE's Foodfluencer Friday Face-Off: International Edition - Toni Chapman	Yes
July 24	Kelly Ripa & Mark Consuelos	Yes	Porsha Williams Guobadia, LIVE's Dog Days of Summer Week - Dog Training Tips	Yes
July 25	Kelly Ripa & Mark Consuelos	Yes	Andrew Rannells, LIVE's Dog Days of Summer Week - Puppy Grooming Tips	Yes
July 26	Kelly Ripa & Mark Consuelos	Yes	Kenya Moore, LIVE's Dog Days of Summer Week - Viral Pet Videos	Yes
July 27	Mark Consuelos & Anderson Cooper	Yes	Michael Symon, LIVE's Dog Days of Summer Week - Staff & Viewers' Video Dog Greetings	Yes
July 28	Mark Consuelos & Déjà Vu	Yes	Craig Ferguson, Big Boi, LIVE's Dog Days of Summer Week - Summer Dog Safety Tips, LIVE's Foodfluencer Friday Face-Off: International Edition - Alejandra Tapia	No
July 31	Kelly Ripa & Mark Consuelos	Yes	Sebastian Maniscalco, LIVE's Summer School Week - How to Take Smartphone Photos	Yes

=== August 2023 ===
Date	Co-hosts	"Host Chat"	Guests/Segments	"Kelly and Mark's Inbox"
August 1	Kelly Ripa & Mark Consuelos	Yes	Julia Stiles, LIVE's Summer School Week - How to Arrange Flowers	Yes
August 2	Kelly Ripa & Mark Consuelos	Yes	Taylor and Taylor Lautner, LIVE's Summer School Week - How to Make Your Own Hot Sauce	Yes
August 3	Kelly Ripa & Mark Consuelos	Yes	Rose Byrne, LIVE's Summer School Week - How to Build Birdhouses	Yes
August 4	Kelly Ripa & Mark Consuelos	Yes	Marcus Scribner, LIVE's Summer School Week - How to Use Kitchen Tools & Gadgets	Yes
August 7	Kelly Ripa & Mark Consuelos	Yes	Tom Segura, Tatiana Maslany, LIVE's Body Boosters Week - Stretching Tips & Techniques	No
August 8	Kelly Ripa & Mark Consuelos	Yes	Lucy Hale, Back-to-School with Steve Patterson, LIVE's Body Boosters Week - Acupuncture	No
August 9	Kelly Ripa & Mark Consuelos	Yes	Nicole “Snooki” Polizzi, Becki Newton, LIVE's Body Boosters Week - Reflexology	No
August 21	Kelly Ripa & Mark Consuelos	Yes	Shaun White, Maisie Peters, End of Summer Gardening Checklist	Yes
August 28	Kelly Ripa & Mark Consuelos	Yes	Victoria Clark, LIVE's Back 2 School Week - Easy School Lunches	Yes
August 29	Kelly Ripa & Mark Consuelos	Yes	Christian Siriano, Rainy Day S'mores Recipe, LIVE's Back 2 School Week - School Stressors	No
August 30	Kelly Ripa & Mark Consuelos	Yes	Jenni "JWoww" Farley, Viral Veggie Recipes, LIVE's Back 2 School Week - Morning Routine Shortcuts	No
August 31	Kelly Ripa & Mark Consuelos	Yes	Heather Dubrow, LIVE's Back 2 School Week - Back 2 School Fashion Show	Yes

=== September 2023 ===
Date	Co-hosts	"Host Chat"	Guests/Segments	"Kelly and Mark's Inbox"
September 1	Kelly Ripa & Mark Consuelos	Yes	Bruno Tonioli, LIVE's Back 2 School Week - Pro Parenting Tips	Yes

== Season 36 (2023–2024) ==
=== September 2023 ===
Date	Co-hosts	"Host chat"	Guests / segments	"Kelly and Mark's Inbox"
September 4	Kelly Ripa & Mark Consuelos	Yes	Derek Hough, Shinedown	No
September 5	Kelly Ripa & Mark Consuelos	Yes	Melissa Etheridge, LIVE's Teamwork Makes the Dream Work Week - Team Building Exercises	No
September 6	Kelly Ripa & Mark Consuelos	Yes	Jake Gyllenhaal, Charity Lawson & Dotun Olubeko, LIVE's Teamwork Makes the Dream Work Week	No
September 7	Kelly Ripa & Mark Consuelos	Yes	Josh Gad, Phillip Phillips, LIVE's Teamwork Makes the Dream Work Week - Body Language Effects	No
September 8	Kelly Ripa & Mark Consuelos	Yes	Brie & Nikki Bella, Better Sleep Bargains, LIVE's Teamwork Makes the Dream Work Week - Partner Pilates	No
September 11	Kelly Ripa & Mark Consuelos	Yes	Rachel Bloom, LIVE Loves New York Week - LaChanze	Yes
September 12	Kelly Ripa & Mark Consuelos	Yes	Neil deGrasse Tyson, Matt Gutman, LIVE Loves New York Week - Devon Rodriguez	No
September 13	Kelly Ripa & Mark Consuelos	Yes	Josh Duhamel, Carrie Ann Inaba, LIVE Loves New York Week - Blue Man Group	No
September 14	Kelly Ripa & Déjà Vu	Yes	Tamron Hall, LIVE Loves New York Week - Henrik Lundqvist	No
September 15	Kelly Ripa & Mark Consuelos	Yes	Tracy Morgan, Tamra Judge, LIVE Loves New York Week - Mark's New York Memories	No
September 18	Kelly Ripa & Mark Consuelos	Yes	Ryan Seacrest, LIVE's Record Breaker Week	No
September 19	Kelly Ripa & Mark Consuelos	Yes	Anderson Cooper, Julie Chen Moonves, LIVE's Record Breaker Week	No
September 20	Kelly Ripa & Mark Consuelos	Yes	Curtis "50 Cent" Jackson, Matteo Bocelli, LIVE's Record Breaker Week	No
September 21	Kelly Ripa & Mark Consuelos	Yes	Julianne Hough, LIVE's Record Breaker Week	No
September 22	Kelly Ripa & Mark Consuelos	Yes	Alfonso Ribeiro, Bishme Cromartie, LIVE's Record Breaker Week	No
September 25	Kelly Ripa & Mark Consuelos	Yes	Robert Herjavec, LIVE's Let's Dance Week - Masala Bhangra	Yes
September 26	Kelly Ripa & Mark Consuelos	Yes	Tiffani Thiessen, Phil Keoghan, LIVE's Let's Dance Week - Hip Hop	No
September 27	Kelly Ripa & Mark Consuelos	Yes	Hannah Waddingham, Gerry Turner, LIVE's Let's Dance Week - Salsa	No
September 28	Kelly Ripa & Mark Consuelos	Yes	Barbara Corcoran, Barenaked Ladies, LIVE's Let's Dance Week - Country Line Dancing	No
September 29	Kelly Ripa & Mark Consuelos	Yes	Luann de Lesseps, JP Saxe, LIVE's Let's Dance Week - Rumba	No

=== October 2023 ===
Date	Co-hosts	"Host chat"	Guests / segments	"Kelly and Mark's Inbox"
October 2	Kelly Ripa & Mark Consuelos	Yes	Randy Jackson, Hilarie Burton Morgan, LIVE's Pack Your Bags Week - Travel Etiquette	No
October 3	Kelly Ripa & Mark Consuelos	Yes	Leslie Odom Jr., Drew Holcomb and The Neighbors, LIVE's Pack Your Bags Week - Travel Health	Yes
October 4	Kelly Ripa & Mark Consuelos	Yes	Jane Krakowski, LIVE's Pack Your Bags Week - Holiday Travel Tips	No
October 5	Kelly Ripa & Mark Consuelos	Yes	Billy Porter, LIVE's Pack Your Bags Week - Travel Fitness Tips	Yes
October 6	Kelly Ripa & Mark Consuelos	Yes	Elle & Keegan-Michael Key, LIVE's Pack Your Bags Week - Hidden Travel Deals	Yes
October 9	Kelly Ripa & Mark Consuelos	Yes	Arnold Schwarzenegger, Breast Cancer Awareness	Yes
October 10	Kelly Ripa & Mark Consuelos	Yes	Chrissy Metz, World Mental Health Day	Yes
October 11	Kelly Ripa & Mark Consuelos	Yes	Lisa Edelstein, Jessie James Decker	No
October 12	Kelly Ripa & Mark Consuelos	Yes	Lisa Rinna, Constance Wu, Winter Illness Updates	No
October 13	Kelly Ripa & Mark Consuelos	Yes	Damon Wayans, Jr., Fitz and the Tantrums, Outdoor Halloween Decor Tips	Yes
October 16	Kelly Ripa & Mark Consuelos	Yes	Jada Pinkett Smith, Embracing Your Age	Yes
October 17	Kelly Ripa & Mark Consuelos	Yes	Mark Cuban, Jim Gaffigan	Yes
October 18	Kelly Ripa & Mark Consuelos	Yes	Jon Batiste, Corbin Bleu, World's Largest Pumpkin	Yes
October 19	Kelly Ripa & Mark Consuelos	Yes	Fisher Stevens, Casey Cott, Fall Foods	No
October 20	Kelly Ripa & Mark Consuelos	Yes	Jonathan Van Ness, Deborah Roberts, A Great Big World	Yes
October 23	Kelly Ripa & Mark Consuelos	Yes	John Stamos, Mark Goes to Formula 1	Yes
October 24	Kelly Ripa & Mark Consuelos	Yes	Heidi Gardner, LIVE's Countdown to Halloween Week - Halloween Survival Kit	Yes
October 25	Kelly Ripa & Mark Consuelos	Yes	Allison Williams, Chris Janson, LIVE's Countdown to Halloween Week - No Carve Pumpkin Decorating	Yes
October 26	Kelly Ripa & Mark Consuelos	Yes	Vanna White, Fall Fashion Bargains, LIVE's Countdown to Halloween Week - Pumpkin Carving	No
October 27	Kelly Ripa & Mark Consuelos	Yes	Kyle Richards, Caroline Rhea, LIVE's Countdown to Halloween Week - Last Minute Trendy Halloween Costumes	No
October 30	Kelly Ripa & Mark Consuelos	Yes	Gizelle Bryant, Paul Russell, LIVE's Countdown to Halloween Week - DIY Halloween Décor	Yes
October 31	Kelly Ripa & Mark Consuelos	Yes	LIVE's Halloween: The Eras Show; Michael Urie	No

=== November 2023 ===
Date	Co-hosts	"Host chat"	Guests / segments	"Kelly and Mark's Inbox"
November 1	Kelly Ripa & Mark Consuelos	Yes	Justin Long, Behind-the-Scenes of LIVE's Halloween Show, Sleep Paralysis & Narcolepsy Tips	No
November 2	Kelly Ripa & Mark Consuelos	Yes	Josh Radnor, Fall Comfort Cooking, Pre-Holiday Bargains	Yes
November 3	Kelly Ripa & Mark Consuelos	Yes	Bertie Gregory, Pre-Holiday Bargains, Storing & Sharing Holiday Photos	No
November 6	Kelly Ripa & Mark Consuelos	Yes	Gerry Turner, Jordan Davis, LIVE's Great Getaways Week - Outdoor Destinations Off the Beaten Path	Yes
November 7	Kelly Ripa & Mark Consuelos	Yes	Ryan Blaney, Sean O'Malley, LIVE's Great Getaways Week - Foodie Destinations	Yes
November 8	Kelly Ripa & Mark Consuelos	Yes	Brian Cox, Ian Somerhalder, LIVE's Great Getaways Week - Music Tour Tourism	Yes
November 9	Kelly Ripa & Mark Consuelos	Yes	Chelsea Handler, Joan Baez, LIVE's Great Getaways Week - Couples Trips	Yes
November 10	Kelly Ripa & Mark Consuelos	Yes	Rita Wilson, AJR, LIVE's Great Getaways Week - Family Trips on a Budget	No
November 13	Kelly Ripa & Mark Consuelos	Yes	Michael C. Hall & Princess Goes, Jeannie Mai, LIVE's Gratitude is the Attitude Week - Gratitude & Giving	Yes
November 14	Kelly Ripa & Mark Consuelos	Yes	Kenan Thompson, Nikki & Brie Garcia, LIVE's Gratitude is the Attitude Week - How a Positive Attitude Affects Relationships	Yes
November 15	Kelly Ripa & Mark Consuelos	Yes	Matt Bomer, Jeff Probst, LIVE's Gratitude is the Attitude Week - Medical & Health Benefits of Gratitude	Yes
November 16	Kelly Ripa & Mark Consuelos	Yes	Taika Waititi, Chris Redd, Get a Jump on Black Friday Bargains, LIVE's Gratitude is the Attitude Week - Medical & Health Benefits of Gratitude	Yes
November 17	Kelly Ripa & Mark Consuelos	Yes	Colman Domingo, Mikey Day, Get a Jump on Black Friday Bargains, LIVE's Gratitude is the Attitude Week - Inbox	Yes
November 20	Kelly Ripa & Mark Consuelos	Yes	Jesse Palmer, JoJo Siwa, LIVE's Thanksgiving Cooking Week - Kelly	No
November 21	Kelly Ripa & Mark Consuelos	Yes	Cynthia Nixon, Carson Kressley, LIVE's Thanksgiving Cooking Week - Dave Mullen	Yes
November 22	Kelly Ripa & Mark Consuelos	Yes	Chris Pine, Black Friday Deals, LIVE's Thanksgiving Cooking Week - Gelman	No
November 27	Kelly Ripa & Mark Consuelos	Yes	Anne Hathaway, Paris Hilton, Baz Luhrmann	Yes
November 28	Kelly Ripa & Mark Consuelos	Yes	Jennifer Garner, Bryant Gumbel, Samara Joy	No
November 29	Mark Consuelos & Déjà Vu	Yes	Sebastian Maniscalco, David Blaine	Yes
November 30	Kelly Ripa & Mark Consuelos	Yes	Melissa McCarthy, Kurt & Wyatt Russell	No

=== December 2023 ===
Date	Co-hosts	"Host chat"	Guests / segments	"Kelly and Mark's Inbox"
December 1	Mark Consuelos & Déjà Vu	Yes	Julianne Moore, Patrick Stewart, Chris Byrne	No
December 4	Kelly Ripa & Mark Consuelos	Yes	Elle Fanning, Eric Stonestreet, LIVE's Week of Gift Bargains - Beauty and Skincare	Yes
December 5	Kelly Ripa & Mark Consuelos	Yes	Jimmy Fallon, Anderson Cooper, LIVE's Week of Gift Bargains - Gifts for Men	No
December 6	Kelly Ripa & Mark Consuelos	Yes	Shannen Doherty, Ariana Madix, LIVE's Week of Gift Bargains - Gifts for Foodies	No
December 7	Kelly Ripa & Mark Consuelos	Yes	Natalie Portman, Sara Bareilles, LIVE's Week of Gift Bargains - Gifts for Everyone	Yes
December 8	Kelly Ripa & Mark Consuelos	Yes	Kal Penn, Jordan Fisher, LIVE's Week of Gift Bargains - Gifts Under $20	Yes
December 11	Kelly Ripa & Mark Consuelos	Yes	Mark Wahlberg, Jeffrey Wright	Yes
December 12	Kelly Ripa & Mark Consuelos	Yes	Sydney Sweeney, Harry Hamlin, Cirque du Soleil	Yes
December 13	Kelly Ripa & Mark Consuelos	Yes	Fantasia Barrino, Claire Foy, DIY Holiday Sweaters	Yes
December 14	Kelly Ripa & Mark Consuelos	Yes	Tracee Ellis Ross, Joel Madden	No
December 15	Kelly Ripa & Mark Consuelos	Yes	LIVE's Holiday Sweater Party: Elizabeth Banks, Katharine McPhee, Radio City Rockettes, Holiday Sweater Fashion Show	No
December 18	Kelly Ripa & Mark Consuelos	Yes	Awkwafina, Charles Melton, LIVE's Holiday Family Cookie Countdown - Laurie, Jamie & Misha Gelman	Yes
December 19	Kelly Ripa & Mark Consuelos	Yes	Patrick Dempsey, Nicki Minaj, LIVE's Holiday Family Cookie Countdown - Michael & Lola Consuelos	No
December 20	Kelly Ripa & Mark Consuelos	Yes	Adam Driver, Patrick Wilson, LIVE's Holiday Family Cookie Countdown - Déjà	Yes
December 21	Kelly Ripa & Mark Consuelos	Yes	Leslie Jones, LIVE's Holiday Family Cookie Countdown - David Mullen	Yes
December 22	Kelly Ripa & Mark Consuelos	Yes	LIVE's Family Holiday Party: Sharpe Family Singers, Steve Patterson, Santa, LIVE's Holiday Memories & Family Flashbacks	No
December 26	Kelly Ripa & Mark Consuelos	Yes	Rosamund Pike, Gerry Turner & Theresa Nist, Drew Holcomb and the Neighbors	Yes
December 29	Kelly Ripa & Mark Consuelos	Yes	Gary Oldman, Maisie Peters, How to Reset in the New Year	No

=== January 2024 ===
Date	Co-hosts	"Host chat"	Guests / segments	"Kelly and Mark's Inbox"
January 2	Kelly Ripa & Mark Consuelos	Yes	Tamron Hall, Strive for More in '24: New Year, New Food Habits	Yes
January 8	Kelly Ripa & Mark Consuelos	Yes	Vivica A. Fox, Kel Mitchell, Strive for More in '24: Simple Wellness Week - Battling Burnout	Yes
January 9	Kelly Ripa & Mark Consuelos	Yes	Daniel Kaluuya, Strive for More in '24: Simple Wellness Week - Anxiety-Fighting Foods	Yes
January 10	Kelly Ripa & Mark Consuelos	Yes	Victor Garber, Strive for More in '24: Simple Wellness Week - Building Better Habits	Yes
January 11	Kelly Ripa & Mark Consuelos	Yes	Sterling K. Brown, James Patterson, Strive for More in '24: Simple Wellness Week - Superfoods for Ultimate Wellness	No
January 12	Kelly Ripa & Mark Consuelos	Yes	Dan Levy, Josh Hutcherson, Strive for More in '24: Simple Wellness Week - Mindfulness Tips	No
January 15	Kelly Ripa & Mark Consuelos	Yes	Ruth Wilson, Strive for More in '24: Fitness Week - Getting Started on Your Fitness Journey	Yes
January 16	Kelly Ripa & Mark Consuelos	Yes	Jason Priestley, Brit Marling, Strive for More in '24: Fitness Week - Mobility Exercises	No
January 17	Kelly Ripa & Mark Consuelos	Yes	Juno Temple, Rick Springfield & Richard Marx, Strive for More in '24: Fitness Week - Kelly's Workout	No
January 18	Kelly Ripa & Mark Consuelos	Yes	Sofia Vergara, Winter Wellness Bargains, Strive for More in '24: Fitness Week - Mark's Workout	Yes
January 19	Kelly Ripa & Mark Consuelos	Yes	Adam Copeland, Alaqua Cox, Strive for More in '24: Fitness Week - Gelman's Workout	Yes
January 22	Kelly Ripa & Mark Consuelos	Yes	Ken Jennings, Joey Graziadei, Strive for More in '24: Parenting Week - Fostering Independence In Your Kids	Yes
January 23	Kelly Ripa & Mark Consuelos	Yes	Ken Jeong, Jennifer Nettles, Strive for More in '24: Parenting Week - Alternatives to Punishment	Yes
January 24	Kelly Ripa & Mark Consuelos	Yes	Calista Flockhart, Chrissy Teigen, Strive for More in '24: Parenting Week - Healthy Eating Habits for Kids	Yes
January 25	Kelly Ripa & Mark Consuelos	Yes	Tom Hollander, Strive for More in '24: Parenting Week - Teaching Kids About Money	Yes
January 26	Kelly Ripa & Mark Consuelos	Yes	Naomi Watts, Grace Potter, Strive for More in '24: Parenting Week - Common Viruses & Serious Illnesses	No
January 29	Kelly Ripa & Mark Consuelos	Yes	Bryan Cranston, Nikolaj Coster-Waldau, Strive for More in '24: Super Senior Week - At-Home Skincare Routine	Yes
January 30	Kelly Ripa & Mark Consuelos	Yes	Bryce Dallas Howard, Strive for More in '24: Super Senior Week - Planning for Retirement at Any Age	Yes
January 31	Kelly Ripa & Mark Consuelos	Yes	Ariana DeBose, Cole Sprouse, Strive for More in '24: Super Senior Week - Nutrition for Healthy Aging	No

=== February 2024 ===
Date	Co-hosts	"Host chat"	Guests / segments	"Kelly and Mark's Inbox"
February 1	Kelly Ripa & Mark Consuelos	Yes	Catherine O'Hara, Jon Batiste, Strive for More in '24: Super Senior Week - Best Places to Retire	Yes
February 2	Kelly Ripa & Mark Consuelos	Yes	Sam Rockwell, Chef Melba Wilson, Strive for More in '24: Super Senior Week - How to Keep Your Memory Sharp	No
February 5	Kelly Ripa & Mark Consuelos	Yes	LIVE's Viewers' Choice Show 2023	No
February 6	Kelly Ripa & Mark Consuelos	Yes	Quinta Brunson, How to Find Love & Overcome Dating Obstacles	Yes
February 7	Kelly Ripa & Mark Consuelos	Yes	Dakota Johnson, Sara Gilbert, Adam Grant	No
February 8	Kelly Ripa & Mark Consuelos	Yes	Camila Mendes, JP Saxe, Lunar New Year Shrimp Recipe	Yes
February 9	Kelly Ripa & Mark Consuelos	Yes	Diane Lane, Pamper Yourself Bargains, Game Day Recipes & Avoiding Food Waste	No
February 12	Kelly Ripa & Mark Consuelos	Yes	Ryan Seacrest, LIVE's Love Week - Keeping Love Alive	Yes
February 13	Kelly Ripa & Mark Consuelos	Yes	Jane Krakowski, Janelle James, LIVE's Love Week - The Love Inbox	Yes
February 14	Kelly Ripa & Mark Consuelos	Yes	LIVE's Love Show: Jon Batiste & Suleika Jaouad, Tyler James Williams, LIVE's Love Week	Yes
February 15	Kelly Ripa & Mark Consuelos	Yes	Evan Rachel Wood, Dylan McDermott, LIVE's Love Week	Yes
February 16	Kelly Ripa & Mark Consuelos	Yes	Darren Criss, Noomi Rapace, LIVE's Love Week	Yes
February 19	Kelly Ripa & Mark Consuelos	Yes	Jenna Dewan, Boredom Busters for Kids	No
February 20	Kelly Ripa & Mark Consuelos	Yes	Ramón Rodríguez, William Byron	Yes
February 21	Kelly Ripa & Mark Consuelos	Yes	Danai Gurira, Joey Graziadei	Yes
February 22	Kelly Ripa & Mark Consuelos	Yes	Cynthia Nixon, National Chili Day	Yes
February 23	Kelly Ripa & Mark Consuelos	Yes	Aaron Tveit, Guy Fieri	Yes
February 26	Kelly Ripa & Mark Consuelos	Yes	Camryn Manheim, Robbie & Stephen Amell, Heart Disease Risks	No
February 27	Kelly Ripa & Mark Consuelos	Yes	LIVE! in Las Vegas: Sheryl Lee Ralph, Performance from Rouge: The Sexiest Show in Vegas, Kelly & Mark Tour Sphere & The Fontainebleau	No
February 28	Kelly Ripa & Mark Consuelos	Yes	LIVE! in Las Vegas: Howie Mandel, REO Speedwagon, Carrot Top, Kelly & Mark Revisit Carol of the Bells	No
February 29	Kelly Ripa & Mark Consuelos	Yes	LIVE! in Las Vegas: Jim Gaffigan, Steve Aoki & Lil John, Mark Visits UFC Training Center, Kelly and Mark Visit the Spa	No

=== March 2024 ===
Date	Co-hosts	"Host chat"	Guests / segments	"Kelly and Mark's Inbox"
March 1	Kelly Ripa & Mark Consuelos	Yes	LIVE! in Las Vegas: Lionel Richie, DJ Pauly D, Kelly Makes Pasta with Chef Evan Funke, Performance from Michael Jackson One	No
March 4	Kelly Ripa & Mark Consuelos	Yes	Scott Foley, Linsey Davis, LIVE's Oscar Countdown Games - Missing Movie Posters	Yes
March 5	Kelly Ripa & Mark Consuelos	Yes	Eugene Levy, Denise Richards, LIVE's Oscar Countdown Games - Sketching with the Stars	Yes
March 6	Kelly Ripa & Mark Consuelos	Yes	Annette Bening, John Bradley, At-Home Oscars Party Tips	Yes
March 7	Kelly Ripa & Mark Consuelos	Yes	Ayesha Curry, Cat Deeley, LIVE's Oscar Countdown Games - Oscar Kazoo Songs	No
March 8	Kelly Ripa & Mark Consuelos	Yes	LIVE's Countdown to the Oscars Special: Jesse Palmer, Marcia Gay Harden, Oscar Memories and Flashbacks, Oscars Nominee Roundup, LIVE's Oscar Countdown Games - Know Your Oscars	No
March 11	Kelly Ripa & Mark Consuelos	Yes	LIVE's After the Oscars Show: Jesse Palmer, Sebastian Maniscalco, Oscar Fashion Panel with Elaine Welteroth, Jimmy Kimmel, Andy Grammer	No
March 12	Kelly Ripa & Mark Consuelos	Yes	Carrie Coon, Beau Bridges, Behind-the-Scenes of LIVE's After the Oscars Show	No
March 13	Kelly Ripa & Mark Consuelos	Yes	Angela Bassett, Tig Notaro	Yes
March 14	Kelly Ripa & Mark Consuelos	Yes	Jenny McCarthy, Mikey Day, Clever Solution Bargains	No
March 15	Kelly Ripa & Mark Consuelos	Yes	David Alan Grier, National Crafting Month	Yes
March 18	Kelly Ripa & Mark Consuelos	Yes	Ricky Martin, Bush, LIVE's Cooking School Week - Michael Symon	No
March 19	Kelly Ripa & Mark Consuelos	Yes	Meghan Trainor, Lisa Ann Walter, LIVE's Cooking School Week - Jet Tila	No
March 20	Kelly Ripa & Mark Consuelos	Yes	Brian Tyree Henry, Shaggy feat. Bruce Melodie, LIVE's Cooking School Week - Eric Adjepong	No
March 21	Kelly Ripa & Mark Consuelos	Yes	Jeremy Jordan, Walk Off the Earth, LIVE's Cooking School Week - Gail Simmons	No
March 22	Kelly Ripa & Mark Consuelos	Yes	Lukas Gage, Chyler Leigh, LIVE's Cooking School Week - Eric Ripert	No
March 25	Kelly Ripa & Mark Consuelos	Yes	Carol Burnett, LIVE's Auto Week - Electric Cars	Yes
March 26	Kelly Ripa & Mark Consuelos	Yes	Dakota Fanning, Simon Baker, LIVE's Auto Week - Smart & Sporty Cars	No
March 27	Kelly Ripa & Mark Consuelos	Yes	Maya Rudolph, Ted McGinley, LIVE's Auto Week - Comfort & Luxury Cars	Yes
March 28	Kelly Ripa & Mark Consuelos	Yes	Maura Tierney, Ego Nwodim, LIVE's Auto Week - Rugged and Refined Cars	Yes
March 29	Kelly Ripa & Mark Consuelos	Yes	Jessica Capshaw, Andrea Riseborough, LIVE's Auto Week - New Family Cars	No

=== April 2024 ===
Date	Co-hosts	"Host chat"	Guests / segments	"Kelly and Mark's Inbox"
April 1	Kelly Ripa & Mark Consuelos	Yes	Emma Roberts, Barenaked Ladies, Peanut Butter Recipe Taste Test	Yes
April 8	Kelly Ripa & Mark Consuelos	Yes	Julianne Moore, Grace Potter, Managing Spring Allergies	Yes
April 15	Kelly Ripa & Mark Consuelos	Yes	Liev Schreiber, Carol Kane	Yes
April 16	Kelly Ripa & Mark Consuelos	Yes	Jeremy Sisto, Anna Sawai, Ernest	Yes
April 17	Kelly Ripa & Mark Consuelos	Yes	Kelly and Mark's First Anniversary: Lily Gladstone, Anniversary Moments & Memories, The Anniversary Game	No
April 18	Kelly Ripa & Mark Consuelos	Yes	Jesse Tyler Ferguson, Corey Cott	Yes
April 19	Kelly Ripa & Mark Consuelos	Yes	Billy Gardell, Pam Grier	Yes
April 22	Kelly Ripa & Andy Cohen	Yes	Kim Raver, Hiroyuki Sanada, LIVE's Go Green Week - This or That: Eco-Edition	No
April 23	Kelly Ripa & Mark Consuelos	Yes	Zendaya, Craig David, LIVE's Go Green Week - Plant-Based & No Waste Cooking	No
April 24	Kelly Ripa & Mark Consuelos	Yes	John Leguizamo, Miranda Cosgrove, LIVE's Go Green Week - Energy-Saving Technology	No
April 25	Kelly Ripa & Mark Consuelos	Yes	Eddie Redmayne, Earth Month Bargains, LIVE's Go Green Week - Grow an Eco-Friendly Lawn	Yes
April 26	Kelly Ripa & Mark Consuelos	Yes	Folake Olowofoyeku, Mau y Ricky, LIVE's Go Green Week	No
April 29	Kelly Ripa & Steve Patterson	Yes	Anne Hathaway, Justin Hartley	Yes
April 30	Kelly Ripa & Mark Consuelos	Yes	Carson Kressley, Alex Sharp	Yes

=== May 2024 ===
Date	Co-hosts	"Host chat"	Guests / segments	"Kelly and Mark's Inbox"
May 1	Kelly Ripa & Mark Consuelos	Yes	Phil Keoghan, Cristo Fernández, Summer Skin Essentials	No
May 2	Kelly Ripa & Mark Consuelos	Yes	LIVE's Halfway to Halloween: The Eras Version	No
May 3	Kelly Ripa & Mark Consuelos	Yes	Winston Duke, Kim Fields	Yes
May 6	Kelly Ripa & Mark Consuelos	Yes	Tom Selleck, Lisa Rinna, LIVE's I Love Mom Week - DIY Floral Arrangements	No
May 7	Kelly Ripa & Mark Consuelos	Yes	Jessica Lange, Cedric the Entertainer, LIVE's I Love Mom Week - Paint Your Spouse	No
May 8	Kelly Ripa & Mark Consuelos	Yes	Riley Keough, Caroline Rhea, LIVE's I Love Mom Week - The Love Inbox	Yes
May 9	Kelly Ripa & Mark Consuelos	Yes	Simu Liu, Carrie Preston, LIVE's I Love Mom Week - DIY Last Minute Gifts	Yes
May 10	Kelly Ripa & Mark Consuelos	Yes	LIVE's I Love Mom Show: Jennifer Lopez, Mariska Hargitay, Steve Patterson	No
May 13	Kelly Ripa & Mark Consuelos	Yes	Jimmy Kimmel, Alfonso Ribeiro	Yes
May 14	Kelly Ripa & Mark Consuelos	Yes	Chelsea Handler, Sarah Sherman, Mat Kearney	Yes
May 15	Kelly Ripa & Mark Consuelos	Yes	Michelle Buteau, Nicola Coughlan	Yes
May 16	Kelly Ripa & Mark Consuelos	Yes	Jessica Biel, Iain Armitage, Phillip Phillips	Yes
May 17	Kelly Ripa & Mark Consuelos	Yes	LIVE's Twin Show: Jonathan & Drew Scott, Nikki & Brie Garcia, Twin Telepathy Test	Yes
May 20	Kelly Ripa & Mark Consuelos	Yes	Daisy Ridley, Jameela Jamil, National Rescue Dog Day	No
May 21	Kelly Ripa & Mark Consuelos	Yes	Anya Taylor-Joy, Abi Carter	Yes
May 22	Kelly Ripa & Mark Consuelos	Yes	Rose Byrne, Jay Pharoah	Yes
May 23	Kelly Ripa & Mark Consuelos	Yes	Jeremy Renner, Get Ready for Summer Bargains, Olympic Fencing with Team USA	No
May 24	Kelly Ripa & Mark Consuelos	Yes	Chris Hemsworth, Will Moseley, LIVE's Foodfluencer Friday - Yumna Jawad	No
May 27	Kelly Ripa & Mark Consuelos	Yes	Harry Hamlin, J.B. Smoove, Budget-Friendly Summer Travel Tips	No
May 28	Kelly Ripa & Mark Consuelos	Yes	Jonathan Groff, Adam Rodriguez, Rachel Platten	Yes
May 29	Kelly Ripa & Mark Consuelos	Yes	Ron Howard, Jane Krakowski, Crowded House	Yes
May 30	Kelly Ripa & Mark Consuelos	Yes	Andy Cohen, Sunny Hostin, Judah & the Lion	No
May 31	Kelly Ripa & Mark Consuelos	Yes	Sarah Hyland, LIVE's Foodfluencer Friday - Michael Symon	Yes

=== June 2024 ===
Date	Co-hosts	"Host Chat"	Guests/Segments	"Kelly and Mark's Inbox"
June 3	Kelly Ripa & Mark Consuelos	Yes	Leslie Odom, Jr., Eric Dane, Bruhat Soma	Yes
June 4	Kelly Ripa & Mark Consuelos	Yes	Marlon Wayans, Jonathan Van Ness	Yes
June 5	Kelly Ripa & Mark Consuelos	Yes	Michael Chiklis, Retta	Yes
June 6	Kelly Ripa & Mark Consuelos	Yes	Method Man, James Patterson, Jordan Davis	Yes
June 7	Kelly Ripa & Mark Consuelos	Yes	Amy Poehler, Char Margolis, LIVE's Foodfluencer Friday - Toni Chapman	No
June 10	Kelly Ripa & Mark Consuelos	Yes	George Stephanopoulos, Andrew McCarthy	Yes
June 11	Kelly Ripa & Mark Consuelos	Yes	Theo James, Idina Menzel, The War & Treaty	Yes
June 12	Kelly Ripa & Mark Consuelos	Yes	Amy Ryan, Cast of Stereophonic, Avoiding Summer Scams	No
June 13	Kelly Ripa & Mark Consuelos	Yes	Julia Louis-Dreyfus, James Brolin, Summer Fun Bargains	No
June 14	Kelly Ripa & Mark Consuelos	Yes	Jessica Alba, Understanding Food Expirations, LIVE's Foodfluencer Friday - Jake Cohen	No
June 17	Kelly Ripa & Mark Consuelos	Yes	Howie Mandel, Tips for the Best Beach Day Ever	Yes
June 24	Kelly Ripa & Mark Consuelos	Yes	Steve Guttenberg, Smart Money Moves for Recent Grads, LIVE's Trending Foods Test Kitchen	No

=== July 2024 ===
Date	Co-hosts	"Host Chat"	Guests/Segments	"Kelly and Mark's Inbox"
July 1	Kelly Ripa & Mark Consuelos	Yes	Mark Feuerstein, LIVE's Festive 4th Week - Entertaining Kids on a Rainy Day	Yes
July 2	Kelly Ripa & Mark Consuelos	Yes	Susie Essman, Mike Rowe, LIVE's Festive 4th Week - Fourth of July Picnic	No
July 3	Kelly Ripa & Mark Consuelos	Yes	Debra Jo Rupp, Jennifer Esposito, LIVE's Festive 4th Week - Steve Patterson	No
July 4	Kelly Ripa & Mark Consuelos	Yes	LIVE's 4 July Family Party: Caroline Rhea, Five For Fighting, LIVE's Fourth of July Family Games	No
July 5	Kelly Ripa & Mark Consuelos	Yes	Marilu Henner, LIVE's Foodfluencer Friday - Shereen Pavlides	Yes
July 8	Kelly Ripa & Mark Consuelos	Yes	Faye Dunaway, Jenn Tran, LIVE's Summer Skin Week - Debunking Common Skin Fads	No
July 9	Kelly Ripa & Mark Consuelos	Yes	Teresa Giudice, Kate Upton, LIVE's Summer Skin Week - All About Acne	No
July 10	Kelly Ripa & Mark Consuelos	Yes	Kevin & Franklin Jonas, Summer Bargains, LIVE's Summer Skin Week - Skin Cancer Checklist	Yes
July 11	Kelly Ripa & Mark Consuelos	Yes	Tyler Perry, Summer Fashion Trends, LIVE's Summer Skin Week - Common Summer Skin Issues	Yes
July 12	Kelly Ripa & Mark Consuelos	Yes	Rita Ora, LIVE's Summer Skin Week - Misconceptions About Aging Skin, LIVE's Foodfluencer Friday - Myron Mixon	No
July 15	Kelly Ripa & Mark Consuelos	Yes	Anna Faris, Kylie Cantrall, LIVE's Summer Survival Week - Building a Home Emergency Kit	No
July 16	Kelly Ripa & Mark Consuelos	Yes	Dave Bautista, LIVE's Summer Survival Week - Lifesaving CPR & AED Techniques	No
July 17	Kelly Ripa & Mark Consuelos	Yes	Glen Powell, Shaquille O'Neal, LIVE's Summer Survival Week - Heimlich Maneuver & EpiPen Techniques	Yes
July 18	Kelly Ripa & Mark Consuelos	Yes	Blair Underwood, Zosia Mamet, LIVE's Summer Survival Week - Summer Survival Tips for Pets	No
July 19	Kelly Ripa & Mark Consuelos	Yes	Anthony Ramos, LIVE's Summer Survival Week - Water Safety Tips, LIVE's Foodfluencer Friday - Eitan Bernath	No
July 22	Kelly Ripa & Mark Consuelos	Yes	Ryan Reynolds, Gary Janetti, LIVE's Fix It Week - Quick Fixes to Sell Your Home	No
July 23	Kelly Ripa & Mark Consuelos	Yes	Ralph Macchio, LIVE's Fix It Week - Easy Home Furnishing Fixes	Yes
July 24	Kelly Ripa & Mark Consuelos	Yes	Rob & John Owen Lowe, LIVE's Fix It Week - Instant Curb Appeal Fixes for Less than $100	No
July 25	Kelly Ripa & Mark Consuelos	Yes	Hugh Jackman, LIVE's Fix It Week - Small DIY Fixes That Make a Big Impact	Yes
July 26	Kelly Ripa & Mark Consuelos	Yes	Kiernan Shipka, LIVE's Fix It Week - Quick Fixes for Outdated Kitchens, LIVE's Foodfluencer Friday - Babs Costello	No
July 29	Kelly Ripa & Mark Consuelos	Yes	Bernadette Peters, Hong Chau, Fitz and the Tantrums	Yes
July 30	Kelly Ripa & Mark Consuelos	Yes	Zooey Deschanel, Tips for Finding Love the Second Time Around	Yes
July 31	Kelly Ripa & Mark Consuelos	Yes	Dylan Sprouse, Homemade Pest Remedies	Yes

=== August 2024 ===
Date	Co-hosts	"Host Chat"	Guests/Segments	"Kelly and Mark's Inbox"
August 1	Kelly Ripa & Mark Consuelos	Yes	Minnie Driver, Summer Skin and Beauty Bargains, 411 on Weight Loss Drugs	No
August 2	Kelly Ripa & Mark Consuelos	Yes	David Boreanez, LIVE's Back to School Fashion Show, LIVE's Foodfluencer Friday - Carleigh Bodrug	No
August 5	Mark Consuelos & Déjà Vu	Yes	Mike Colter, Rachel Platten, LIVE's Summer School Week - Hydration 101	No
August 6	Mark Consuelos & Jane Krakowski	Yes	Wayne Brady, Crowded House, LIVE's Summer School Week - WiFi 101	No
August 7	Mark Consuelos & Déjà Vu	Yes	Blake Lively, LIVE's Summer School Week - Travel 101	Yes
August 8	Mark Consuelos & Maria Menounos	Yes	John Stamos, LIVE's Summer School Week - Exercise Basics	No
August 9	Mark Consuelos & Jenny Mollen	Yes	Michael Urie, LIVE's Summer School Week - Knife Sharpening 101, LIVE's Foodfluencer Friday - Kwame Onwuachi	No
August 12	Mark Consuelos & Maria Menounos	Yes	Andra Day, Back 2 School Cool Ideas	Yes
August 19	Kelly Ripa & Mark Consuelos	Yes	Sutton Foster, Tasty Summer Bugs	Yes
August 26	Kelly Ripa & Mark Consuelos	Yes	Ego Nwodim, HRT Myths & Facts	Yes

== Season 37 (2024–2025) ==
=== September 2024 ===
Date	Co-hosts	"Host chat"	Guests / segments	"Kelly and Mark's Inbox"
September 2	Kelly Ripa & Mark Consuelos	Yes	Ana Gasteyer, The War and Treaty, Steve Patterson Recreates Iconic Movie Scenes on the Streets of New York	Yes
September 3	Kelly Ripa & Mark Consuelos	Yes	Taraji P. Henson, Curtis "50 Cent" Jackson, Max Greenfield	No
September 4	Kelly Ripa & Mark Consuelos	Yes	Elizabeth Olsen, Derek Hough	Yes
September 5	Kelly Ripa & Mark Consuelos	Yes	Carrie Coon, Daniel Dae Kim, Tamron Hall & Chef Lish Steiling	No
September 6	Kelly Ripa & Mark Consuelos	Yes	Edie Falco, Handy Fall Bargains, LIVE's First Year Memories	No
September 9	Kelly Ripa & Mark Consuelos	Yes	Ryan Seacrest & Vanna White, James McAvoy, Aryna Sabalenka & Jannik Sinner	No
September 10	Kelly Ripa & Mark Consuelos	Yes	Demi Moore, Los Lonely Boys, LIVE's Turn Back Time Week - Anti-Aging Supplements	No
September 11	Kelly Ripa & Mark Consuelos	Yes	Kaitlin Olson, LIVE's Turn Back Time Week - Anti-Aging Self Care	Yes
September 12	Kelly Ripa & Mark Consuelos	Yes	Jeff Bridges, Juliette Lewis, LIVE's Turn Back Time Week - Pros & Cons of Cosmetic Surgeries	No
September 13	Kelly Ripa & Mark Consuelos	Yes	Laverne Cox, Usher, LIVE's Turn Back Time Week - Tips for Improving Memory	No
September 16	Kelly Ripa & Mark Consuelos	Yes	David Muir, Wilmer Valderrama, LIVE's Record Breaker Week	No
September 17	Kelly Ripa & Mark Consuelos	Yes	Josh Gad, Ashley Park, LIVE's Record Breaker Week	No
September 18	Kelly Ripa & Mark Consuelos	Yes	Colin Farrell, Joan Vassos, LIVE's Record Breaker Week	No
September 19	Kelly Ripa & Mark Consuelos	Yes	Eva Mendes, Calum Scott, LIVE's Record Breaker Week	No
September 20	Kelly Ripa & Mark Consuelos	Yes	Kelsey Grammer, LIVE's Record Breaker Week, Art's Farewell Celebration	No
September 23	Kelly Ripa & Mark Consuelos	Yes	Jay Pharoah, Recap of LIVE's Record Breaker Week, LIVE's Fall Into the Season Week - Fall Foliage Road Trips	Yes
September 24	Kelly Ripa & Mark Consuelos	Yes	Joseph Gordon-Levitt, Arthur Hanlon, LIVE's Fall Into the Season Week - Fall Into Healthy Eating Habits	Yes
September 25	Kelly Ripa & Mark Consuelos	Yes	Shailene Woodley, LIVE's Fall Into the Season Week - How to Beat the Fall Blues	Yes
September 26	Kelly Ripa & Mark Consuelos	Yes	Niecy Nash-Betts, LIVE's Fall Into the Season Week - Winter Skin Prep	Yes
September 27	Kelly Ripa & Mark Consuelos	Yes	Joshua Jackson, Fantastic Fall Bargains, LIVE's Fall Into the Season Week - Guide to Fall Apples	Yes
September 30	Kelly Ripa & Mark Consuelos	Yes	Liam Hemsworth, Felicity Huffman, Gavin DeGraw	Yes

=== October 2024 ===
Date	Co-hosts	"Host chat"	Guests / segments	"Kelly and Mark's Inbox"
October 1	Kelly Ripa & Mark Consuelos	Yes	Paul Reiser, Barry Sonnenfeld, Andy Grammer feat. Maddie & Tae	No
October 2	Kelly Ripa & Mark Consuelos	Yes	Sarah Paulson, The Fray, Rosh Hashanah Recipe, Kelly's Birthday Surprise	Yes
October 3	Kelly Ripa & Mark Consuelos	Yes	Florence Pugh, Jake Shears	Yes
October 4	Kelly Ripa & Mark Consuelos	Yes	Kate Winslet, Stephen Nedoroscik & Rylee Arnold, Tips for Anti-Aging Gut Health	No
October 7	Kelly Ripa & Mark Consuelos	Yes	Ryan Seacrest & Meredith Seacrest Leach, Morris Chestnut, LIVE's Viral Challenges Week - Three-Person Plank	No
October 8	Kelly Ripa & Mark Consuelos	Yes	Quinta Brunson, Josh Andrés Rivera, LIVE's Viral Challenges Week - Titanic Challenge	Yes
October 9	Kelly Ripa & Mark Consuelos	Yes	Riley Keough, Rita Wilson, LIVE's Viral Challenges Week - Partner Handstand Challenge	No
October 10	Kelly Ripa & Mark Consuelos	Yes	Ali Wong, Lamorne Morris, LIVE's Viral Challenges Week - Balance Challenge	No
October 11	Kelly Ripa & Mark Consuelos	Yes	Andrew Garfield, Tyler James Williams, LIVE's Viral Challenges Week - Partner Cartwheel Challenge	No
October 14	Kelly Ripa & Mark Consuelos	Yes	Henry Winkler, Christa Miller, Mau y Ricky	No
October 15	Kelly Ripa & Mark Consuelos	Yes	Ben Falcone & Melissa McCarthy, Mark Cuban	Yes
October 16	Kelly Ripa & Mark Consuelos	Yes	Stanley Tucci, Anna Camp, DIY Halloween Décor	Yes
October 17	Kelly Ripa & Mark Consuelos	Yes	Amy Brenneman, Yvonne Strahovski, Happy @ Home Bargains	No
October 18	Kelly Ripa & Mark Consuelos	Yes	Caitríona Balfe, Emily Osment, Fall Dinner Recipe	No
October 21	Kelly Ripa & Mark Consuelos	Yes	Justin Hartley, Damon Wayans, Jr.	Yes
October 22	Kelly Ripa & Mark Consuelos	Yes	Seth Meyers, Alessia Cara	Yes
October 23	Kelly Ripa & Mark Consuelos	Yes	Tom Holland, David Henrie	Yes
October 24	Kelly Ripa & Mark Consuelos	Yes	Juno Temple, James Patterson, Easy Halloween Treats	Yes
October 25	Kelly Ripa & Mark Consuelos	Yes	Emmy Rossum, Breast Cancer Awareness Month	Yes
October 28	Kelly Ripa & Mark Consuelos	Yes	Jason Derulo; Andrea Bocelli & Lauren Daigle, LIVE's Countdown to Halloween Week - Last Minute Costumes	Yes
October 29	Kelly Ripa & Mark Consuelos	Yes	Robin Wright, Da'Vine Joy Randolph, LIVE's Countdown to Halloween Week - DIY Halloween Party Décor	Yes
October 30	Kelly Ripa & Mark Consuelos	Yes	Keri Russell, LIVE's Countdown to Halloween Week - No-Carve Pumpkin Tips	Yes
October 31	Kelly Ripa & Mark Consuelos	Yes	LIVE's Only Halloween in the Building: Joey Fatone, LIVE's Spooktacular Halloween Costume Contest	No

=== November 2024 ===
Date	Co-hosts	"Host chat"	Guests / segments	"Kelly and Mark's Inbox"
November 1	Kelly Ripa & Mark Consuelos	Yes	Julianna Margulies, Jackie Tohn, Fun Fall Bargains	No
November 4	Kelly Ripa & Mark Consuelos	Yes	Nicole Scherzinger, Kandi Burruss, LIVE's Halloween Look Back	No
November 5	Kelly Ripa & Mark Consuelos	Yes	Tony Goldwyn, Ted McGinley	No
November 6	Kelly Ripa & Mark Consuelos	Yes	Maria Menounos, Nicholas Alexander Chavez	Yes
November 7	Kelly Ripa & Mark Consuelos	Yes	Carrie Ann Inaba, Auli'i Cravalho	Yes
November 8	Kelly Ripa & Mark Consuelos	Yes	Lauren Graham, Tim Matheson, Holiday Shopping Tips	No
November 11	Kelly Ripa & Mark Consuelos	Yes	LIVE! in Palm Springs: Sheryl Lee Ralph, Kyle Richards, Mark & Gelman Play Pickleball	No
November 12	Kelly Ripa & Mark Consuelos	Yes	LIVE! in Palm Springs: Jerry O’Connell & Rebecca Romijn, Char Margolis, Neon Trees, Mark & Jerry Play Golf	No
November 13	Kelly Ripa & Mark Consuelos	Yes	LIVE! in Palm Springs: Mark Harmon, Justine Lupe, Kelly & Mark Visit Mount San Jacinto State Park	No
November 14	Kelly Ripa & Mark Consuelos	Yes	LIVE! in Palm Springs: Don Johnson, Caroline Rhea, Bishop Briggs, Kelly Tours Palm Springs, LIVE's Roper Romp	No
November 15	Kelly Ripa & Mark Consuelos	Yes	Adam Lambert, Aldis Hodge, Nate Smith	No
November 18	Kelly Ripa & Mark Consuelos	Yes	Jeffrey Wright, Flu Season Facts, LIVE's Thanksgiving Family Favorites Week - Kevin Curry	Yes
November 19	Kelly Ripa & Mark Consuelos	Yes	Ted Danson, Camilla Luddington, LIVE's Thanksgiving Family Favorites Week - Suzy Karadsheh	Yes
November 20	Kelly Ripa & Mark Consuelos	Yes	Richard Gere, Jim Gaffigan, Get a Jump on Black Friday Bargains, LIVE's Thanksgiving Family Favorites Week - Yumna Jawad	Yes
November 21	Kelly Ripa & Mark Consuelos	Yes	Maura Tierney, Get a Jump on Black Friday Bargains, LIVE Staff Makeover, LIVE's Thanksgiving Family Favorites Week - Prue Leith	No
November 22	Kelly Ripa & Mark Consuelos	Yes	Cher, Black Friday Bargains, LIVE's Thanksgiving Family Favorites Week - Tieghan Gerard	No
November 25	Kelly Ripa & Mark Consuelos	Yes	Bill Clinton, Kylie Cantrall, LIVE's Thanksgiving Family Feast - Kelly	No
November 26	Kelly Ripa & Mark Consuelos	Yes	Scarlett Johansson, Jodie Turner-Smith, LIVE's Thanksgiving Family Feast - Déjà	No
November 27	Kelly Ripa & Mark Consuelos	Yes	Anthony Anderson, Get a Jump on Black Friday Bargains, LIVE's Thanksgiving Family Feast - Gelman	No
November 29	Kelly Ripa & Mark Consuelos	Yes	Ben Stiller, Calum Scott, A Look at Walmart Black Friday Deals	Yes

=== December 2024 ===
Date	Co-hosts	"Host chat"	Guests / segments	"Kelly and Mark's Inbox"
December 2	Kelly Ripa & Mark Consuelos	Yes	Lin-Manuel Miranda, Janelle James, LIVE's Gift Bargains Week	Yes
December 3	Kelly Ripa & Mark Consuelos	Yes	Bridget Everett, LIVE's Gift Bargains Week	Yes
December 4	Kelly Ripa & Mark Consuelos	Yes	Zoe Saldaña, Fortune Feimster, LIVE's Gift Bargains Week	Yes
December 5	Kelly Ripa & Mark Consuelos	Yes	Martina McBride, Bob Mackie, LIVE's Gift Bargains Week	No
December 6	Kelly Ripa & Mark Consuelos	Yes	Amy Adams, Social Media Safety Tips for Teens, LIVE's Gift Bargains Week	Yes
December 9	Kelly Ripa & Mark Consuelos	Yes	Julianne Moore, Sofia Carson, Sara Evans	Yes
December 10	Kelly Ripa & Mark Consuelos	Yes	Sarah Michelle Gellar, Justin Baldoni, Stella Cole	Yes
December 11	Kelly Ripa & Mark Consuelos	Yes	Ray Romano, Sharon Horgan, Garfunkel & Garfunkel	No
December 12	Kelly Ripa & Mark Consuelos	Yes	Linda Cardellini, Mat Kearney, Last-Minute Holiday Gift Bargains	Yes
December 13	Kelly Ripa & Mark Consuelos	Yes	Jimmy Fallon, Holiday Ginger Snaps Recipe	No
December 16	Kelly Ripa & Mark Consuelos	Yes	Keira Knightley, Billy Eichner, O. A. R., LIVE's Holly Jolly Games	No
December 17	Kelly Ripa & Mark Consuelos	Yes	Michael Fassbender, Nikki Glaser, LIVE's Holly Jolly Games	No
December 18	Kelly Ripa & Mark Consuelos	Yes	James Marsden, Ilana Glazer, LIVE's Holly Jolly Games	Yes
December 19	Kelly Ripa & Mark Consuelos	Yes	Whitney Cummings, Anika Noni Rose, LIVE's Holly Jolly Games	No
December 20	Kelly Ripa & Mark Consuelos	Yes	LIVE's Holiday Sweater Party: Heidi Gardner, Radio City Rockettes, LIVE's Holly Jolly Games, Holiday Sweater Fashion Show	No
December 23	Kelly Ripa & Mark Consuelos	Yes	LIVE's Miracle on 67th Street: Mary J. Blige, The Brooklyn Youth Chorus, Rob Thomas, Santa, LIVE's Holiday Memories & Flashbacks	No

=== January 2025 ===
Date	Co-hosts	"Host chat"	Guests / segments	"Kelly and Mark's Inbox"
January 6	Kelly Ripa & Mark Consuelos	Yes	Michelle Buteau, Scott Wolf, LIVE's How to Thrive in '25 - Five Questions to Ask Yourself	Yes
January 7	Kelly Ripa & Mark Consuelos	Yes	David Schwimmer, Kat Dennings, LIVE's How to Thrive in '25 - How Social Media Affects Your Mood	No
January 8	Kelly Ripa & Mark Consuelos	Yes	Adrien Brody, Pamela Anderson, LIVE's How to Thrive in '25	Yes
January 9	Kelly Ripa & Mark Consuelos	Yes	Tim Allen, James Longman, LIVE's How to Thrive in '25 - Building Better Relationships	No
January 10	Kelly Ripa & Mark Consuelos	Yes	Alan Cumming, Ali Larter, A Great Big World, LIVE's How to Thrive in '25	No
January 13	Kelly Ripa & Mark Consuelos	Yes	Brooke Shields, Andrew Rannells, LIVE's How to Thrive in '25 - Raising Resourceful Kids	Yes
January 14	Kelly Ripa & Mark Consuelos	Yes	Marcia Gay Harden, LIVE's How to Thrive in '25 - Money Myths	Yes
January 15	Kelly Ripa & Mark Consuelos	Yes	Gwendoline Christie, LIVE's How to Thrive in '25 - Tackling Holiday Debt	Yes
January 16	Kelly Ripa & Mark Consuelos	Yes	Gabriel Basso, Fernanda Torres, LIVE's How to Thrive in '25 - Alternative Investments 101	No
January 17	Kelly Ripa & Mark Consuelos	Yes	Chase Stokes, Caring for Your Senior Pet, LIVE's How to Thrive in '25 - Tips for Financial Detox	No
January 21	Kelly Ripa & Anderson Cooper	Yes	Naomi Watts, Ken Jennings, LIVE's How to Thrive in '25 - Longevity Testing Checklist	Yes
January 22	Kelly Ripa & Andy Cohen	Yes	Julia Garner, Morris Chestnut, LIVE's How to Thrive in '25 - Simple Changes to Live Longer	No
January 23	Kelly Ripa & Carson Kressley	Yes	Darren Criss, LIVE's How to Thrive in '25 - Breathwork for a Longer Life and Better Sleep	No
January 24	Kelly Ripa & Mark Consuelos	Yes	Lucy Liu, Omari Hardwick, LIVE's How to Thrive in '25 - Gut Health & Longevity	No
January 27	Kelly Ripa & Mark Consuelos	Yes	Zachary Quinto, Grant Ellis, David Gray	Yes
January 28	Kelly Ripa & Mark Consuelos	Yes	Sterling K. Brown, Lisa Ann Walter, LIVE's How to Thrive in '25 - Food Trends	No
January 29	Kelly Ripa & Mark Consuelos	Yes	Jack Quaid, Lacey Chabert, LIVE's How to Thrive in '25 - The Power of Protein	No
January 30	Kelly Ripa & Mark Consuelos	Yes	Garcelle Beauvais, Shopping Day Bargains, LIVE's How to Thrive in '25 - Mood-Boosting Foods	No
January 31	Kelly Ripa & Mark Consuelos	Yes	Lauren Graham, Aloe Blacc, LIVE's How to Thrive in '25 - Increase GLP1 Naturally	Yes

=== February 2025 ===
Date	Co-hosts	"Host chat"	Guests / segments	"Kelly and Mark's Inbox"
February 3	Kelly Ripa & Mark Consuelos	Yes	Laverne Cox, Olivia Holt, LIVE's Pack Your Bags Week - Avoiding Travel Mistakes	Yes
February 4	Kelly Ripa & Mark Consuelos	Yes	Damon Wayans, Jr., Harry Hamlin, LIVE's Pack Your Bags Week - Romantic Retreats	Yes
February 5	Kelly Ripa & Mark Consuelos	Yes	Anthony Mackie, Capt. Jason Chambers, LIVE's Pack Your Bags Week - Destinations Done Smarter & Cheaper	Yes
February 6	Kelly Ripa & Mark Consuelos	Yes	Ke Huy Quan, Shopping Day Bargains, Judah & the Lion, LIVE's Pack Your Bags Week - Best Places to Go In 2025	No
February 7	Kelly Ripa & Mark Consuelos	Yes	LIVE's Viewers' Choice Show 2024	No
February 10	Kelly Ripa & Mark Consuelos	Yes	Scott Foley, LIVE's Love Week - Navigating Stages of Love	Yes
February 11	Kelly Ripa & Mark Consuelos	Yes	John Lithgow, Alex Cooper, LIVE's Love Week - DIY Valentine's Ideas	Yes
February 12	Kelly Ripa & Mark Consuelos	Yes	Noah Wyle, LIVE's Love Week - Tips on Keeping the Love Alive	Yes
February 13	Kelly Ripa & Mark Consuelos	Yes	Questlove, Shopping Day Bargains, LIVE's Love Week - Love Emoji Game	Yes
February 14	Kelly Ripa & Mark Consuelos	Yes	LIVE's Love Show: Lisa Rinna & Harry Hamlin, Daniella Karagach & Pasha Pashkov, LIVE's Love Week - Steve Patterson Talks to New Yorkers About Valentine's Day	Yes
February 17	Kelly Ripa & Mark Consuelos	Yes	Trudie Styler, Anthony Michael Hall; Fitz and the Tantrums	Yes
February 18	Kelly Ripa & Mark Consuelos	Yes	Connie Britton, William Byron, Victoria Canal	Yes
February 19	Kelly Ripa & Mark Consuelos	Yes	Tituss Burgess, Linsey Davis, The War and Treaty	Yes
February 20	Kelly Ripa & Mark Consuelos	Yes	Robert De Niro, Shopping Day Bargains, Tips for Keeping Your Heart Healthy	Yes
February 21	Kelly Ripa & Mark Consuelos	Yes	Carrie Coon, Will Reeve, Gavin DeGraw	No
February 24	Kelly Ripa & Mark Consuelos	Yes	Hank Azaria & The EZ Street Band, Phil Dunster, LIVE's Countdown to the Oscars - A Look Back at 2024 Oscars Open	No
February 25	Kelly Ripa & Mark Consuelos	Yes	Chelsea Handler, Brenda Song, LIVE's Countdown to the Oscars - A Look Back at Kelly & Ryan's A Star is Born Open	Yes
February 26	Mark Consuelos & Déjà Vu	Yes	Kate Hudson; Jason Derulo & Nora Fatehi, LIVE's Countdown to the Oscars - Healthy Food Swaps for Your Oscar Party	Yes
February 27	Kelly Ripa & Mark Consuelos	Yes	Jeff Probst, Shopping Day Bargains, Aloe Blacc, LIVE's Countdown to the Oscars - Red Carpet Ready Bargains	No
February 28	Mark Consuelos & Déjà Vu	Yes	LIVE's Pre-Oscar Special: Jerry O'Connell, Angela Bassett, Oscars Nominee Roundup with Juju Green, Los Angeles Oscars Tribute, LIVE's After Oscars Memories & Flashbacks	No

=== March 2025 ===
Date	Co-hosts	"Host chat"	Guests / segments	"Kelly and Mark's Inbox"
March 3	Kelly Ripa & Mark Consuelos	Yes	LIVE's After the Oscars Show: Jerry O'Connell, Nikki Glaser, Oscar Fashion Rundown, Steve Aoki & Lil John	No
March 4	Kelly Ripa & Mark Consuelos	Yes	Billy Crudup, Giada De Laurentiis, Behind-the-Scenes of LIVE's After the Oscars Show	No
March 5	Kelly Ripa & Mark Consuelos	Yes	Carrie Underwood, Lionel Richie & Luke Bryan; Jenna Dewan	No
March 6	Kelly Ripa & Mark Consuelos	Yes	RuPaul, Simone Ashley, Shopping Day Bargains, The Fray	Yes
March 7	Kelly Ripa & Mark Consuelos	Yes	Brian Tyree Henry, Gugu Mbatha-Raw, O.A.R.	Yes
March 10	Kelly Ripa & Mark Consuelos	Yes	Gal Gadot, Ben Falcone, Sting & Shaggy	Yes
March 11	Kelly Ripa & Mark Consuelos	Yes	Don Johnson, Nathan Fillion	Yes
March 12	Kelly Ripa & Mark Consuelos	Yes	John Leguizamo, Patina Miller	Yes
March 13	Kelly Ripa & Mark Consuelos	Yes	Cate Blanchett, Amanda Seyfried, Shopping Day Bargains with Steve Patterson	Yes
March 14	Kelly Ripa & Mark Consuelos	Yes	Uzo Aduba, David Gray	No
March 31	Kelly Ripa & Mark Consuelos	Yes	Jenny Mollen, Chef Eric Adjepong, Los Lonely Boys	Yes

=== April 2025 ===
Date	Co-hosts	"Host chat"	Guests / segments	"Kelly and Mark's Inbox"
April 1	Kelly Ripa & Mark Consuelos	Yes	Live's 7 Lincoln Square Farewell: Studio Look Back, Studio by the Numbers, Memories from Staff & Celebrity Friends & Family, Anderson Cooper Makes His 100th Appearance	No
April 7	Kelly Ripa & Mark Consuelos	Yes	Elisabeth Moss, Jay Shetty	Yes
April 8	Kelly Ripa & Mark Consuelos	Yes	Bradley Whitford, Walton Goggins, Dealing with the Stress of Big Changes	Yes
April 9	Kelly Ripa & Mark Consuelos	Yes	Tracee Ellis Ross, Yvonne Strahovski, Tips for Cutting Back on Alcohol	No
April 10	Kelly Ripa & Mark Consuelos	Yes	Matthew Rhys, Chrissy Metz, Shopping Day Bargains	Yes
April 11	Kelly Ripa & Mark Consuelos	Yes	Bryce Dallas Howard, Hailee Steinfeld, Shopping Day Bargains	Yes
April 14	Kelly Ripa & Mark Consuelos	Yes	Porsha Williams, Cameron Mathison	Yes
April 15	Kelly Ripa & Mark Consuelos	Yes	David Oyelowo, T. R. Knight, Tips to Reduce Spending	No
April 16	Kelly Ripa & Mark Consuelos	Yes	Josh Duhamel, Lake Bell, DIY Mother's Day Gifts	No
April 17	Kelly Ripa & Mark Consuelos	Yes	Christopher Meloni, Aly Raisman, Shopping Day Bargains	No
April 18	Kelly Ripa & Mark Consuelos	Yes	Daisy Edgar-Jones, Akon, Jewelry Shopping for Mom	Yes
April 21	Kelly Ripa & Mark Consuelos	Yes	Eva Longoria, Annaleigh Ashford	Yes
April 22	Kelly Ripa & Mark Consuelos	Yes	Diego Luna, Minka Kelly	Yes
April 23	Kelly Ripa & Mark Consuelos	Yes	Ricky Gervais, Lisa Vanderpump	Yes
April 24	Kelly Ripa & Mark Consuelos	Yes	Michael Urie, Edi Patterson, Shopping Day Bargains	No
April 25	Kelly Ripa & Mark Consuelos	Yes	Oprah Winfrey, Chef Eric Ripert	Yes
April 28	Kelly Ripa & Mark Consuelos	Yes	Jonathan Groff, Deborah Roberts, Gardening Tips	No
April 29	Kelly Ripa & Mark Consuelos	Yes	Stanley Tucci, Ed Helms, Samara Joy	No
April 30	Kelly Ripa & Mark Consuelos	Yes	Jeffrey Dean Morgan, Da'Vine Joy Randolph, John Morgan	Yes

=== May 2025 ===
Date	Co-hosts	"Host chat"	Guests / segments	"Kelly and Mark's Inbox"
May 1	Kelly Ripa & Mark Consuelos	Yes	Wilmer Valderrama, Jamie Oliver, Shopping Day Bargains	No
May 2	Kelly Ripa & Mark Consuelos	Yes	Florence Pugh, Adam DeVine	No
May 5	Kelly Ripa & Mark Consuelos	Yes	David Spade, Jordan Davis, LIVE's I Love Mom Week	Yes
May 6	Kelly Ripa & Mark Consuelos	Yes	Nate Bargatze, Adam Rodriguez, LIVE's I Love Mom Week	Yes
May 7	Kelly Ripa & Mark Consuelos	Yes	Jim Gaffigan, Benjamin Bratt, LIVE's I Love Mom Week	Yes
May 8	Kelly Ripa & Mark Consuelos	Yes	Rebel Wilson, Shopping Day Bargains, LIVE's I Love Mom Week - Prioritize Yourself on Mother's Day	Yes
May 9	Kelly Ripa & Mark Consuelos	Yes	LIVE's I Love Mom Show: Holly Robinson Peete, Mother's Day Makeover, 98 Degrees, Steve Patterson	Yes
May 12	Kelly Ripa & Mark Consuelos	Yes	Gordon Ramsay, Jessi Ngatikaura	Yes
May 13	Kelly Ripa & Mark Consuelos	Yes	Jay Pharoah, Alfonso Ribeiro, Drew Baldridge	No
May 14	Kelly Ripa & Mark Consuelos	Yes	Ryan Seacrest, Ramón Rodríguez, JoJo Siwa	Yes
May 15	Kelly Ripa & Mark Consuelos	Yes	Nick Jonas, Bernadette Peters, Shopping Day Bargains	No
May 16	Kelly Ripa & Mark Consuelos	Yes	Alexander Skarsgård, Howie Mandel, Katie Taylor & Amanda Serrano	No
May 19	Kelly Ripa & Mark Consuelos	Yes	Meghann Fahy, Hayley Atwell, LoCash	No
May 20	Kelly Ripa & Mark Consuelos	Yes	Elizabeth Banks, Josh Holloway, Jamal Roberts	No
May 21	Kelly Ripa & Mark Consuelos	Yes	Kristin Davis, Ryan Phillippe, Meditation Tips	No
May 22	Kelly Ripa & Mark Consuelos	Yes	Cynthia Nixon, Finola Hughes, Shopping Day Bargains	No
May 23	Kelly Ripa & Mark Consuelos	Yes	Sarah Jessica Parker, Method Man, Sizzle in the City: Hottest Summer Dishes - Shereen Pavlides	No
May 26	Kelly Ripa & Mark Consuelos	Yes	Amanda Peet, Caroline Rhea, LIVE's No-Gear Workout Week - Stability and Mobility Tips	No
May 27	Kelly Ripa & Mark Consuelos	Yes	Julianne Moore, Phaedra Parks, LIVE's No-Gear Workout Week - Yoga	No
May 28	Kelly Ripa & Mark Consuelos	Yes	Sarah Silverman, Ashley Tisdale, LIVE's No-Gear Workout Week - Strength Training	No
May 29	Kelly Ripa & Mark Consuelos	Yes	Megan Hilty, Shopping Day Bargains, LIVE's No-Gear Workout Week - Pilates	No
May 30	Kelly Ripa & Mark Consuelos	Yes	Ralph Macchio, Sizzle in the City: Hottest Summer Dishes - Jake Cohen, LIVE's No-Gear Workout Week - Running	Yes

=== June 2025 ===
Date	Co-hosts	"Host Chat"	Guests/Segments	"Kelly and Mark's Inbox"
June 2	Kelly Ripa & Mark Consuelos	Yes	Jodie Comer, Faizan Zaki	Yes
June 3	Kelly Ripa & Mark Consuelos	Yes	Tyler Perry, Brianne Howey	Yes
June 4	Kelly Ripa & Mark Consuelos	Yes	Zoe Saldaña, Natasha Rothwell, Grace Potter	No
June 5	Kelly Ripa & Mark Consuelos	Yes	Leslie Bibb, Shopping Day Bargains, Antonia Gentry	No
June 6	Kelly Ripa & Mark Consuelos	Yes	Patrick Schwarzenegger, Steve Guttenberg, Sizzle in The City: Hottest Summer Dishes - Chef Maria Loi	No
June 9	Kelly Ripa & Mark Consuelos	Yes	Joel McHale, Monica Barbaro	Yes
June 10	Kelly Ripa & Mark Consuelos	Yes	Bryce Dallas Howard, Jenny Slate; Arthur Hanlon, Manuel Medrano & Nia Skyfer	No
June 11	Kelly Ripa & Mark Consuelos	Yes	Taron Egerton, Henry Winkler, Steve Patterson Tours 7 Hudson Square	No
June 12	Kelly Ripa & Mark Consuelos	Yes	Orlando Bloom, Shopping Day Bargains, Jason Isaacs	No
June 13	Kelly Ripa & Mark Consuelos	Yes	Jon Hamm, The Doobie Brothers, Summer Activities for Kids, Sizzle in The City: Hottest Summer Dishes - Michael Symon	No
June 16	Kelly Ripa & Mark Consuelos	Yes	Daymond John, AI 101	No
June 23	Kelly Ripa & Mark Consuelos	Yes	Anthony Ramos, Shopping Day Bargains, Sugar Snap Salad Recipe	No
June 30	Kelly Ripa & Mark Consuelos	Yes	Evan Handler, Mason Thames, LIVE's 4th of July Week - Party Ideas	No

=== July 2025 ===
Date	Co-hosts	"Host Chat"	Guests/Segments	"Kelly and Mark's Inbox"
July 1	Kelly Ripa & Mark Consuelos	Yes	David Muir, Liza Colón-Zayas, LIVE's 4th of July Week - Healthy Food Swaps	Yes
July 2	Kelly Ripa & Mark Consuelos	Yes	Jesse Palmer, Maria Menounos, LIVE's 4th of July Week - Pass the Hula Hoop Game	Yes
July 3	Kelly Ripa & Mark Consuelos	Yes	Nicholas Hoult, Shopping Day Bargains, LIVE's 4th of July Week - Velcro Helmet Ball Catch	Yes
July 4	Kelly Ripa & Mark Consuelos	Yes	LIVE's 4th of July Beach Party: Wayne Brady, Sizzle in The City: Hottest Summer Dishes - John Kanell, LIVE's Fourth of July Games, Craig Morgan	No
July 7	Kelly Ripa & Mark Consuelos	Yes	Maggie Q, LIVE's Summer Savings Week - Inexpensive Ways to Entertain Your Kids	Yes
July 8	Kelly Ripa & Mark Consuelos	Yes	Jensen Ackles, Nikki Garcia, LIVE's Summer Savings Week - Saving on Summer Travel	No
July 9	Kelly Ripa & Mark Consuelos	Yes	Rachel Brosnahan, LIVE's Summer Savings Week - Smart Summer Spending	Yes
July 10	Kelly Ripa & Mark Consuelos	Yes	Rita Ora, Shopping Day Bargains, LIVE's Summer Savings Week - Preparing Meat on a Budget	Yes
July 11	Kelly Ripa & Mark Consuelos	Yes	Jerry O'Connell, LIVE's Summer Savings Week - Saving on Summer Skincare, Sizzle in The City: Hottest Summer Dishes - Michael Consuelos	No
July 14	Kelly Ripa & Mark Consuelos	Yes	Malin Akerman, Meg Donnelly, LIVE's Test Yourself Week - Fukuda Step Test	Yes
July 15	Kelly Ripa & Mark Consuelos	Yes	Gavin Casalegno, LIVE's Test Yourself Week - Old Man Sock and Shoe Test	Yes
July 16	Kelly Ripa & Mark Consuelos	Yes	Freddie Prinze Jr., Chris Briney, LIVE's Test Yourself Week - Testing Brain Function	Yes
July 17	Kelly Ripa & Mark Consuelos	Yes	Nick Offerman, Shopping Day Bargains, LIVE's Test Yourself Week - Assessing Your Motor Skills	No
July 18	Kelly Ripa & Mark Consuelos	Yes	Rebecca Romijn, Chris Byrne, Sizzle in The City: Hottest Summer Dishes - Daniel Boulud	No
July 21	Kelly Ripa & Mark Consuelos	Yes	LL Cool J, Kristen Johnson, Lena & Billie Get a Dog Makeover	Yes
July 22	Kelly Ripa & Mark Consuelos	Yes	Judge Judy Sheindlin, Cancer Screening Tips	Yes
July 23	Kelly Ripa & Mark Consuelos	Yes	Vanessa Kirby, Elizabeth McGovern	Yes
July 24	Kelly Ripa & Mark Consuelos	Yes	Jonathan Van Ness, Shopping Day Bargains, How to Take the Best Summer Photos	No
July 25	Kelly Ripa & Mark Consuelos	Yes	Leanne Morgan, John Morgan, Sizzle in The City: Hottest Summer Dishes - Andrew Rae	No
July 28	Kelly Ripa & Mark Consuelos	Yes	Lindsay Lohan, Paul Walter Hauser	Yes
July 29	Kelly Ripa & Phil DeCastro	Yes	Jamie Lee Curtis, Sofia Carson	No
July 30	Kelly Ripa & David Muir	Yes	Christine Baranski, Mamie Gummer	Yes
July 31	Kelly Ripa & John Berman	Yes	Taye Diggs, Shopping Day Bargains, The Doobie Brothers	Yes

=== August 2025 ===
Date	Co-hosts	"Host Chat"	Guests/Segments	"Kelly and Mark's Inbox"
August 1	Kelly Ripa & Steve Patterson	Yes	Pamela Anderson, Sizzle in The City: Hottest Summer Dishes - Toni Chapman	Yes
August 4	Mark Consuelos & Jackie Tohn	Yes	Christopher Jackson, Shopping Day Bargains, LIVE's Summer School Week - Snack Smarter	No
August 5	Mark Consuelos & Jenna Dewan	Yes	Anna Chlumsky, Shopping Day Bargains, LIVE's Summer School Week - Emergency Room 101	No
August 6	Mark Consuelos & Rita Ora	Yes	Tony Hawk, Shopping Day Bargains, LIVE's Summer School Week - Home Hacks	No
August 7	Mark Consuelos & Elle Duncan	Yes	Carol Leifer, Shopping Day Bargains, LIVE's Summer School Week - Summer Safety Tips	No
August 8	Mark Consuelos & Emily Beier	Yes	Matt Friend, Shopping Day Bargains, LIVE's Summer School Week - Digital Safety Tips, Sizzle in The City: Hottest Summer Dishes - Alex Guarnaschelli	No
August 11	Kelly Ripa & Mark Consuelos	Yes	Geena Davis, Seth MacFarlane, Back to School Crafts	No
August 18	Kelly Ripa & Mark Consuelos	Yes	Jason Biggs, Wendell Pierce, Shopping Day Bargains	No
August 25	Kelly Ripa & Mark Consuelos	Yes	Danielle Brooks, Benito Skinner, Shopping Day Bargains	No

== Season 38 (2025–2026) ==
=== September 2025 ===
Date	Co-hosts	"Host chat"	Guests / segments	"Kelly and Mark's Inbox"
September 1	Kelly Ripa & Mark Consuelos	Yes	Paul Wesley, Carson Kressley, Gelman's Guide to Grilling the Perfect Steak	No
September 2	Kelly Ripa & Mark Consuelos	Yes	Taylor Kitsch, Lola Tung	Yes
September 3	Kelly Ripa & Mark Consuelos	Yes	Rose Byrne, Derek Hough, KALEO	Yes
September 4	Kelly Ripa & Mark Consuelos	Yes	Julianne Hough, Jordan Davis	Yes
September 5	Kelly Ripa & Mark Consuelos	Yes	Catherine Zeta-Jones, Alix Earle, Shopping Day Bargains	No
September 8	Kelly Ripa & Mark Consuelos	Yes	Rainn Wilson, John Edward, LIVE's Do It Week - Partner Plank Challenges	No
September 9	Kelly Ripa & Mark Consuelos	Yes	Charlie Sheen, Matteo Bocelli, LIVE's Do It Week - Men vs. Women Challenges	No
September 10	Kelly Ripa & Mark Consuelos	Yes	Jessica Chastain, Joanne Froggatt, LIVE's Do It Week - Social Media Challenges	Yes
September 11	Kelly Ripa & Mark Consuelos	Yes	Zosia Mamet, Tamron Hall, LIVE's Do It Week - Viral Dance Challenges	No
September 12	Kelly Ripa & Mark Consuelos	Yes	Selena Gomez, Shopping Day Bargains, LIVE's Do It Week - Hot Ones Challenge	No
September 15	Kelly Ripa & Mark Consuelos	Yes	Andy Cohen, Lilly Singh, LIVE's Raise the Woof Week - CPR for Dogs	Yes
September 16	Kelly Ripa & Mark Consuelos	Yes	Marlon Wayans, Lily James, LIVE's Raise the Woof Week - Puppy Training Tips	No
September 17	Kelly Ripa & Mark Consuelos	Yes	Eva Longoria, Niko Moon, LIVE's Raise the Woof Week - Doggie Dos and Don'ts	Yes
September 18	Kelly Ripa & Mark Consuelos	Yes	Eugene Levy, Michael Chiklis, Shopping Day Bargains, LIVE's Raise the Woof Week - Shelter Q&A	Yes
September 19	Kelly Ripa & Mark Consuelos	Yes	Ethan Hawke, Sarah McLachlan, Flu Season Tips, LIVE's Raise the Woof Week - Rescue Dog Makeovers	Yes
September 22	Kelly Ripa & Mark Consuelos	Yes	Jane Lynch, Ginger Zee, LIVE's Fall Into the Season Week - Rosh Hashanah Recipe	Yes
September 23	Kelly Ripa & Mark Consuelos	Yes	Jane Krakowski, LIVE's Fall Into the Season Week - Fall Crafts	Yes
September 24	Kelly Ripa & Mark Consuelos	Yes	Jason George, Mel Owens, LIVE's Fall Into the Season Week - Fall Travel Tips	Yes
September 25	Kelly Ripa & Mark Consuelos	Yes	Mariah Carey, Shopping Day Bargains, LIVE's Fall Into the Season Week - Fall Gardening Tips	No
September 26	Kelly Ripa & Mark Consuelos	Yes	Jimmy Fallon, Rachel Scott, LIVE's Fall Into the Season Week - Fall Refresh Makeovers	No
September 29	Kelly Ripa & Mark Consuelos	Yes	Tim Allen, Tips to Avoid Phone & Message Scams	Yes
September 30	Kelly Ripa & Mark Consuelos	Yes	Lionel Richie, Charlie Hunnam	No

=== October 2025 ===
Date	Co-hosts	"Host chat"	Guests / segments	"Kelly and Mark's Inbox"
October 1	Kelly Ripa & Mark Consuelos	Yes	Sheryl Lee Ralph, Grace Van Patten	Yes
October 2	Kelly Ripa & Mark Consuelos	Yes	Glen Powell, Paige DeSorbo, Shopping Day Bargains, Kelly's Birthday Surprise	Yes
October 3	Kelly Ripa & Mark Consuelos	Yes	Tony Shalhoub, Tips for Managing Health Denial	Yes
October 6	Kelly Ripa & Mark Consuelos	Yes	Jennifer Lopez, Michaela Jaé Rodriguez	Yes
October 7	Kelly Ripa & Mark Consuelos	Yes	Chris O'Donnell, Mason Thames, Josh Ross	Yes
October 8	Kelly Ripa & Mark Consuelos	Yes	Ryan Reynolds, DIY Halloween Décor	Yes
October 9	Kelly Ripa & Mark Consuelos	Yes	Kirsten Dunst, Lukas Gage, Shopping Day Bargains	No
October 10	Kelly Ripa & Mark Consuelos	Yes	Maya Rudolph, Greta Lee	Yes
October 13	Kelly Ripa & Mark Consuelos	Yes	Bradley Whitford, Colin Hanks	Yes
October 14	Kelly Ripa & Mark Consuelos	Yes	Allison Janney, Justin Hartley, Tips to Make Your Home Your Own	Yes
October 15	Kelly Ripa & Mark Consuelos	Yes	Jeremy Sisto, Cherry Pie Pocket Recipe, Midnight 'Til Morning	Yes
October 16	Kelly Ripa & Mark Consuelos	Yes	Richard Gere, Donnie Wahlberg, Shopping Day Bargains	No
October 17	Kelly Ripa & Mark Consuelos	Yes	Victoria Beckham, Garlic Bread Pasta Recipe	Yes
October 20	Kelly Ripa & Mark Consuelos	Yes	Chandra Wilson, Tips for Winter Skin Prep	Yes
October 21	Kelly Ripa & Mark Consuelos	Yes	Tessa Thompson, Jackie Tohn, Chris Young	No
October 22	Kelly Ripa & Mark Consuelos	Yes	Allison Williams, Jessica Capshaw	Yes
October 23	Kelly Ripa & Mark Consuelos	Yes	Jeremy Allen White, Shopping Day Bargains, Breast Cancer Awareness & Prevention Tips	No
October 24	Kelly Ripa & Mark Consuelos	Yes	Jeremy Renner, Deborah Roberts	Yes
October 27	Kelly Ripa & Mark Consuelos	Yes	Diane Lane, LIVE's Countdown to Halloween Week - DIY Halloween Costumes	Yes
October 28	Kelly Ripa & Mark Consuelos	Yes	Sarah Paulson, Robin Roberts, LIVE's Countdown to Halloween Week - No-Carve Pumpkins	Yes
October 29	Kelly Ripa & Mark Consuelos	Yes	Colin Farrell, Leanne Morgan, LIVE's Countdown to Halloween Week - Spooky Snacks	Yes
October 30	Kelly Ripa & Mark Consuelos	Yes	Tyler Perry, Shopping Day Bargains, LIVE's Countdown to Halloween Week - Halloween Flashbacks	Yes
October 31	Kelly Ripa & Mark Consuelos	Yes	LIVE's Halloween Show: It's Trending: Leslie Odom, Jr., Dallas Cowboys Cheerleaders, LIVE's Halloween Costume Contest	No

=== November 2025 ===
Date	Co-hosts	"Host chat"	Guests / segments	"Kelly and Mark's Inbox"
November 3	Kelly Ripa & Steve Patterson	Yes	Rami Malek, Lacey Chabert, Hellen Obiri, LIVE's Halloween Behind-the-Scenes	Yes
November 4	Kelly Ripa & Mark Consuelos	Yes	Sydney Sweeney, Performance from Aladdin	Yes
November 5	Kelly Ripa & Mark Consuelos	Yes	Anderson Cooper, Suleika Jaouad	Yes
November 6	Kelly Ripa & Déjà Vu	Yes	Teyana Taylor, Brittany Snow, Shopping Day Bargains	No
November 7	Kelly Ripa & Mark Consuelos	Yes	Michael Bublé, Janelle James, Valentina Shevchenko	No
November 10	Kelly Ripa & Mark Consuelos	Yes	The Jonas Brothers, Ali Larter, Goldie Boutilier	Yes
November 11	Kelly Ripa & Mark Consuelos	Yes	Elle Fanning, Andy Garcia	Yes
November 12	Kelly Ripa & Mark Consuelos	Yes	Matthew Broderick, Jen Affleck, National French Dip Day Recipe	Yes
November 13	Kelly Ripa & Mark Consuelos	Yes	Billy Bob Thornton, Olivia Holt, Train	No
November 14	Kelly Ripa & Mark Consuelos	Yes	Eva LaRue, Layla Taylor, Shopping Day Bargains, Sarah McLachlan	No
November 17	Kelly Ripa & Mark Consuelos	Yes	Meghan Trainor, Thanksgiving Survival Tips	Yes
November 18	Kelly Ripa & Mark Consuelos	Yes	Ana Gasteyer, Barbara Corcoran, Red Panda	Yes
November 19	Kelly Ripa & Mark Consuelos	Yes	Michelle Yeoh; Ted Danson & Mary Steenburgen, Black Friday Bargains	Yes
November 20	Kelly Ripa & Mark Consuelos	Yes	Jeff Goldblum, Sherri Shepherd, Black Friday Bargains	No
November 21	Kelly Ripa & Mark Consuelos	Yes	Sebastian Maniscalco, Black Friday Bargains, Butternut Squash Soup Recipe	No
November 24	Kelly Ripa & Mark Consuelos	Yes	Ke Huy Quan, Lili Reinhart, LIVE's Thanksgiving Turkey 3 Ways - Steve Patterson	Yes
November 25	Kelly Ripa & Mark Consuelos	Yes	Laurie Metcalf, LIVE's Thanksgiving Turkey 3 Ways - Melba Wilson, The Unwrap Race	No
November 26	Kelly Ripa & Mark Consuelos	Yes	Trisha Yearwood, LIVE's Thanksgiving Turkey 3 Ways - Matt Groark	No

=== December 2025 ===
Date	Co-hosts	"Host chat"	Guests / segments	"Kelly and Mark's Inbox"
December 1	Kelly Ripa & Mark Consuelos	Yes	Minnie Driver, Kyle Richards	Yes
December 2	Kelly Ripa & Mark Consuelos	Yes	Denis Leary, Mario Lopez	Yes
December 3	Kelly Ripa & Mark Consuelos	Yes	Cynthia Nixon, Alexandra Breckenridge	Yes
December 4	Kelly Ripa & Mark Consuelos	Yes	Michelle Pfeiffer, Shopping Day Bargains, Tips for Hosting Holiday Overnight Guests	No
December 5	Kelly Ripa & Mark Consuelos	Yes	George Clooney, Seared Sea Scallops Recipe	Yes
December 8	Kelly Ripa & Mark Consuelos	Yes	Sigourney Weaver, Mark Hamill, LIVE's Gift Bargains Week	Yes
December 9	Kelly Ripa & Mark Consuelos	Yes	Mila Kunis, Taran Killam, LIVE's Gift Bargains Week	Yes
December 10	Kelly Ripa & Mark Consuelos	Yes	Lorraine Bracco, Caroline Rhea, LIVE's Gift Bargains Week	No
December 11	Kelly Ripa & Mark Consuelos	Yes	Zooey Deschanel, Rich Eisen, LIVE's Gift Bargains Week	No
December 12	Kelly Ripa & Mark Consuelos	Yes	Colman Domingo, Niko Moon, LIVE's Gift Bargains Week	No
December 15	Kelly Ripa & Mark Consuelos	Yes	Daisy Ridley, LIVE's Eat, Drink & Be Merry Week - Kelly's Figgy Pudding Recipe	Yes
December 16	Kelly Ripa & Mark Consuelos	Yes	Hugh Jackman, Finn Wolfhard, LIVE's Eat, Drink & Be Merry Week - Dave Mullen's Crumb Cake Recipe	No
December 17	Kelly Ripa & Mark Consuelos	Yes	Kate Hudson, Walker Scobell, LIVE's Eat, Drink & Be Merry Week - Déjà's Mini-Quiche Recipe	No
December 18	Kelly Ripa & Mark Consuelos	Yes	Fran Drescher, LIVE's Eat, Drink & Be Merry Week - Gelman's Beef Bourguignon Recipe	Yes
December 19	Kelly Ripa & Mark Consuelos	Yes	LIVE's Holiday Sweater Party: Hank Azaria & the EZ Street Band, Holiday Sweater Fashion Show	No
December 22	Kelly Ripa & Mark Consuelos	Yes	Alfre Woodard; Kelli Finglass & Judy Trammell, Kaleo	Yes
December 23	Kelly Ripa & Mark Consuelos	Yes	Jerry O'Connell, Chris Young, Last-Minute DIY Gift Ideas	Yes
December 24	Kelly Ripa & Mark Consuelos	Yes	LIVE's Holiday House Party: John Stamos, Radio City Rockettes, Steve Patterson, Train, Santa, LIVE's Holiday Memories	No

=== January 2026 ===
Date	Co-hosts	"Host chat"	Guests / segments	"Kelly and Mark's Inbox"
January 5	Kelly Ripa & Mark Consuelos	Yes	Lucy Liu, Billy Gardell, LIVE's A Simple Fix for '26 - How to Live to 100	No
January 6	Kelly Ripa & Mark Consuelos	Yes	Jenny McCarthy, Ramón Rodríguez, LIVE's A Simple Fix for '26 - How Supplements and GLP-1s Affect Longevity	No
January 7	Kelly Ripa & Mark Consuelos	Yes	Ken Jeong, Sadie Sink, LIVE's A Simple Fix for '26 - Medical Tests That Can Help You Live Longer	No
January 8	Kelly Ripa & Mark Consuelos	Yes	Holly Hunter, Shopping Day Bargains, LIVE's A Simple Fix for '26 - Sleep Tips to Live a Long and Healthy Life	No
January 9	Kelly Ripa & Mark Consuelos	Yes	Chris Perfetti, LIVE's A Simple Fix for '26 - Longevity Tips for Aging Pets	Yes
January 12	Kelly Ripa & Mark Consuelos	Yes	Laura Dern, Aaron Tveit, LIVE's A Simple Fix for '26 - Everyday Hidden Hazards	No
January 13	Kelly Ripa & Mark Consuelos	Yes	Joel Edgerton, Tyler James Williams, LIVE's A Simple Fix for '26 - Hidden Cancer Dangers in Everyday Habits	No
January 14	Kelly Ripa & Mark Consuelos	Yes	Alan Cumming, Kim Fields, LIVE's A Simple Fix for '26 - Hidden Kitchen Hazards	Yes
January 15	Kelly Ripa & Mark Consuelos	Yes	Carrie Coon, Shopping Day Bargains, LIVE's A Simple Fix for '26 - Hidden Pet Dangers	No
January 16	Kelly Ripa & Mark Consuelos	Yes	Walton Goggins, Haley Lu Richardson, LIVE's How to Thrive in '25 - Hidden Dangers for Kids at Home	No
January 19	Kelly Ripa & Mark Consuelos	Yes	Sir Ben Kingsley, LIVE's A Simple Fix for '26 - The Healing Power of Resistance	Yes
January 20	Kelly Ripa & Mark Consuelos	Yes	Chris Pratt, Jennette McCurdy, LIVE's A Simple Fix for '26 - Can You Avoid Alzheimer's and Dementia?	Yes
January 21	Kelly Ripa & Mark Consuelos	Yes	Scott Foley, Jeremy Pope, Richard Marx	Yes
January 22	Kelly Ripa & Mark Consuelos	Yes	Kim Raver, Yahya Abdul-Mateen II	Yes
January 23	Kelly Ripa & Mark Consuelos	Yes	Claire Foy, Michael Urie, Shopping Day Bargains	No
January 26	Kelly Ripa & Mark Consuelos	Yes	Jason Biggs, Leslie Iwerks, LIVE's A Simple Fix for '26 - Keeping Money from Ruining Your Relationship	No
January 27	Kelly Ripa & Mark Consuelos	Yes	Paris Hilton, Whitney Leavitt, LIVE's A Simple Fix for '26 - Preparing Wills and Trusts	Yes
January 28	Kelly Ripa & Mark Consuelos	Yes	Patrick Dempsey, Katherine LaNasa, Aloe Blacc & Eric Hirshberg	Yes
January 29	Kelly Ripa & Mark Consuelos	Yes	Kevin James, Milo Manheim, Shopping Day Bargains, LIVE's A Simple Fix for '26 - Digging Yourself Out of Debt	No
January 30	Kelly Ripa & Mark Consuelos	Yes	LIVE's Viewers' Choice Show 2025	No

=== February 2026 ===
Date	Co-hosts	"Host chat"	Guests / segments	"Kelly and Mark's Inbox"
February 2	Kelly Ripa & Mark Consuelos	Yes	Simu Liu, Mikey Day, LIVE's Great Getaways for Less Week - Destinations for Shoulder Season	Yes
February 3	Kelly Ripa & Mark Consuelos	Yes	Gabrielle Union, Susan Lucci, LIVE's Great Getaways for Less Week - Money-Saving Family Vacations	Yes
February 4	Kelly Ripa & Mark Consuelos	Yes	Kelly Rowland, Craig Ferguson, LIVE's Great Getaways for Less Week - The Great American Road Trip	Yes
February 5	Kelly Ripa & Mark Consuelos	Yes	Lea Michele, Shopping Day Bargains, LIVE's Great Getaways for Less Week - Beach Getaways	Yes
February 6	Kelly Ripa & Mark Consuelos	Yes	Josh Charles, Matt Friend, LIVE's Great Getaways for Less Week - Travel Inbox	Yes
February 9	Kelly Ripa & Mark Consuelos	Yes	Constance Zimmer, Jacob Soboroff, 38 Special, LIVE's Love Week	Yes
February 10	Kelly Ripa & Mark Consuelos	Yes	Nicholas Braun, Yerin Ha, Shopping Day Bargains, LIVE's Love Week	Yes
February 11	Kelly Ripa & Mark Consuelos	Yes	Cody Rhodes, Sarah Pidgeon, LIVE's Love Week	Yes
February 12	Kelly Ripa & Mark Consuelos	Yes	Hilarie Burton Morgan, Red Carpet Skin Secrets, LIVE's Love Week - Determining Romance Scams	Yes
February 13	Kelly Ripa & Mark Consuelos	Yes	LIVE's Love Show: Robert & Kym Herjavec, LIVE's Love Week - Steve Patterson Talks to New Yorkers About Dating Red Flags	Yes
February 16	Kelly Ripa & Mark Consuelos	Yes	Sarah Michelle Gellar, Kandi Burruss	No
February 17	Kelly Ripa & Mark Consuelos	Yes	Milo Ventimiglia, Tyler Reddick, The Band Perry	Yes
February 18	Kelly Ripa & Mark Consuelos	Yes	Wendell Pierce, Tracy Letts, Josh Ross	Yes
February 19	Kelly Ripa & Mark Consuelos	Yes	Jennifer Garner, Stellan Skarsgård, Shopping Day Bargains	Yes
February 20	Kelly Ripa & Mark Consuelos	Yes	Kelly's 25th Anniversary Special: Michael Consuelos, Jerry O’Connell, David Muir, Art Moore, David Garibaldi; Moments, Messages & Memories	No
February 23	Kelly Ripa & Mark Consuelos	Yes	Carson Kressley, Buying & Selling in Today's Housing Market, Train	Yes
February 24	Kelly Ripa & Mark Consuelos	Yes	Neve Campbell, Jeff Probst, Chloe Kim	No
February 25	Kelly Ripa & Mark Consuelos	Yes	Nate Bargatze, Taylor Tomlinson, Bobby Moynihan	Yes
February 26	Kelly Ripa & Mark Consuelos	Yes	Sterling K. Brown, Shopping Day Bargains, Brain-Boosting Games	Yes
February 27	Kelly Ripa & Mark Consuelos	Yes	Courteney Cox, LeAnn Rimes	No

=== March 2026 ===
Date	Co-hosts	"Host chat"	Guests / segments	"Kelly and Mark's Inbox"
March 2	Kelly Ripa & Mark Consuelos	Yes	Zach Braff, Wagner Moura, Hunter Hayes	Yes
March 3	Kelly Ripa & Mark Consuelos	Yes	Luke Grimes, Christa Miller, Alysa Liu	Yes
March 4	Kelly Ripa & Mark Consuelos	Yes	Annette Bening, Padma Lakshmi; Jimmy Jam & Terry Lewis	No
March 5	Kelly Ripa & Mark Consuelos	Yes	Scott Speedman, Ken Jennings, Shopping Day Bargains	No
March 6	Kelly Ripa & Mark Consuelos	Yes	Caitriona Balfe, Leo Woodall, Top Skin Myths	No
March 9	Kelly Ripa & Mark Consuelos	Yes	Jenna Dewan, Scott Wolf, LIVE's Countdown to the Oscars - Oscar Kazoo Songs	No
March 10	Kelly Ripa & Mark Consuelos	Yes	Kurt Russell, LIVE's Countdown to the Oscars - Guess the Actor	No
March 11	Kelly Ripa & Mark Consuelos	Yes	Chris O'Donnell; Madison Chock & Evan Bates, LIVE's Countdown to the Oscars - Match the Oscars	Yes
March 12	Kelly Ripa & Mark Consuelos	Yes	Lauren Graham, Shopping Day Bargains, Travis Bolt, LIVE's Countdown to the Oscars - Hollywood Hue Makeovers	Yes
March 13	Kelly Ripa & Mark Consuelos	Yes	LIVE's Pre-Oscars Special: Matt Friend, Adrien Brody, Oscars Nominee Roundup with Juju Green, Wolfgang Puck	No
March 16	Kelly Ripa & Mark Consuelos	Yes	LIVE's After the Oscars Show: Matt Friend, Leanne Morgan, Oscar Fashion Panel with Carson Kressley, Wyclef Jean feat. Andra Day & DJ Cassidy	No
March 17	Kelly Ripa & Mark Consuelos	Yes	Elisabeth Moss, Shaggy & Robin Thicke, Behind-the-Scenes of LIVE's After the Oscars Show	Yes
March 18	Kelly Ripa & Mark Consuelos	Yes	Linda Cardellini, Taylor Frankie Paul	Yes
March 19	Kelly Ripa & Mark Consuelos	Yes	Kate Mara, Lara Spencer, Shopping Day Bargains	Yes
March 20	Kelly Ripa & Mark Consuelos	Yes	Rose Byrne, Robin Roberts, 38 Special	Yes
March 23	Kelly Ripa & Mark Consuelos	Yes	Howie Mandel, Anika Noni Rose, Shopping Day Bargains	Yes
March 30	Kelly Ripa & Mark Consuelos	Yes	Nikki & Brie Bella, Arielle Kebbel, Shopping Day Bargains	No

=== April 2026 ===
Date	Co-hosts	"Host chat"	Guests / segments	"Kelly and Mark's Inbox"
April 6	Kelly Ripa & Mark Consuelos	Yes	Sir Ian McKellen, Camila Morrone, LIVE's Spring Has Sprung Week - Spring Cleaning Tips	No
April 7	Kelly Ripa & Mark Consuelos	Yes	Halle Bailey, Ann Dowd, LIVE's Spring Has Sprung Week - Spring Allergy Tips	Yes
April 8	Kelly Ripa & Mark Consuelos	Yes	Elle Fanning, Frankie Muniz, LIVE's Spring Has Sprung Week - Spring Dangers	No
April 9	Kelly Ripa & Mark Consuelos	Yes	Dan Levy, Felicity Huffman, Shopping Day Bargains, LIVE's Spring Has Sprung Week - Spring Inbox	Yes
April 10	Kelly Ripa & Mark Consuelos	Yes	Eva Longoria, Regé-Jean Page, LIVE's Spring Has Sprung Week - Spring Gardening Trends	No
April 13	Kelly Ripa & Mark Consuelos	Yes	Jennie Garth, Phoebe Dynevor	Yes
April 14	Kelly Ripa & Mark Consuelos	Yes	Michaela Jaé Rodriguez, Tom Blyth, Lou Gramm	Yes
April 15	Kelly Ripa & Mark Consuelos	Yes	Kimberly Williams-Paisley, Charles Melton, Amy Grant	Yes
April 16	Kelly Ripa & Mark Consuelos	Yes	Taraji P. Henson, Corey Stoll, Shopping Day Bargains	No
April 17	Kelly Ripa & Mark Consuelos	Yes	Lisa Vanderpump, Ben Ahlers, Eric Ripert	Yes
April 20	Kelly Ripa & Mark Consuelos	Yes	Vincent D'Onofrio, Bear Grylls	Yes
April 21	Kelly Ripa & Mark Consuelos	Yes	Quinta Brunson, Jason Ritter	Yes
April 22	Kelly Ripa & Mark Consuelos	Yes	Nikki Glaser, Donnie Wahlberg	Yes
April 23	Kelly Ripa & Mark Consuelos	Yes	Kate Hudson, Shopping Day Bargains, Chad King	Yes
April 24	Kelly Ripa & Mark Consuelos	Yes	Nia Long, Kelli O'Hara, Jordan McKnight	No
April 27	Kelly Ripa & Mark Consuelos	Yes	Anne Hathaway, Brenda Song	Yes
April 28	Kelly Ripa & Mark Consuelos	Yes	Emily Blunt, Ellen Burstyn	Yes
April 29	Kelly Ripa & Mark Consuelos	Yes	Ana Gasteyer, Simone Ashley	Yes
April 30	Kelly Ripa & Mark Consuelos	Yes	Stanley Tucci, Wilmer Valderrama, Shopping Day Bargains	No

=== May 2026 ===
Date	Co-hosts	"Host chat"	Guests / segments	"Kelly and Mark's Inbox"
May 1	Kelly Ripa & Mark Consuelos	Yes	Matthew Rhys, Tips on Tick Prevention	No
May 4	Kelly Ripa & Mark Consuelos	Yes	Jamie Lynn Sigler, Jay Pharoah, LIVE's I Love Mom Week	Yes
May 5	Kelly Ripa & Mark Consuelos	Yes	Anthony Anderson, Paul Bettany, LIVE's I Love Mom Week	Yes
May 6	Kelly Ripa & Mark Consuelos	Yes	Kevin McKidd, Taylor Ortega, Root Refresh Makeover, LIVE's I Love Mom Week	Yes
May 7	Mark Consuelos & Jane Krakowski	Yes	Jaafar Jackson, Kristen Kish, Shopping Day Bargains, LIVE's I Love Mom Week	Yes
May 8	Kelly Ripa & Mark Consuelos	Yes	LIVE's I Love Mom Show: Jerry O'Connell & Mom Linda, Lindsay Hubbard, LIVE's I Love Mom Week	Yes
May 11	Kelly Ripa & Mark Consuelos	Yes	Jimmy Kimmel & Guillermo Rodriguez; John Ford Coley, LIVE's Cooking School Week - Barbara Costello	No
May 12	Kelly Ripa & Mark Consuelos	Yes	John Leguizamo, Lamorne Morris, LIVE's Cooking School Week - Matt Groark	Yes
May 13	Kelly Ripa & Mark Consuelos	Yes	Alfonso Ribeiro, Hannah Harper, LIVE's Cooking School Week - Yumna Jawad	No
May 14	Kelly Ripa & Mark Consuelos	Yes	Geena Davis, Lisa Ann Walter, Shopping Day Bargains, LIVE's Cooking School Week - Christian Petroni	No
May 15	Kelly Ripa & Mark Consuelos	Yes	Hank Azaria, Jordan McCullough, LIVE's Cooking School Week - Melba Wilson	No
May 18	Kelly Ripa & Mark Consuelos	Yes	Brooke Shields, David Tennant	Yes
May 19	Kelly Ripa & Mark Consuelos	Yes	Mandy Moore, Kyle Cooke	Yes
May 20	Kelly Ripa & Mark Consuelos	Yes	David Duchovny, Leo Woodall, Summer Dog Safety Tips	No
May 21	Kelly Ripa & Mark Consuelos	Yes	Christopher Abbott, Shopping Day Bargains, Health Advice for AI	Yes
May 22	Kelly Ripa & Mark Consuelos	Yes	Craig Ferguson, Ariel Winter, LIVE's Great American Cookout - Geoffrey Zakarian	No
May 25	Kelly Ripa & Mark Consuelos	Yes	Jon Cryer, Kevin Jonas, LIVE's Get Ready for Summer Week - Tips for Summer Hosting	No
May 26	Kelly Ripa & Mark Consuelos	Yes	Andrew Rannells, Martha Raddatz, LIVE's Get Ready for Summer Week - Tips for Avoiding Summer Stress	No
May 27	Kelly Ripa & Mark Consuelos	Yes	Wanda Sykes, Poorna Jagannathan, LIVE's Get Ready for Summer Week - Tips for Planning Summer Travel	No
May 28	Kelly Ripa & Mark Consuelos	Yes	Brendan Fraser, Shopping Day Bargains, LIVE's Get Ready for Summer Week - Simple Summer Food Switch-Ups	No
May 29	Kelly Ripa & Mark Consuelos	Yes	Laurie Metcalf, Alfre Woodard, LIVE's Great American Cookout - Shereen Pavlides	No

=== June 2026 ===
Date	Co-hosts	"Host Chat"	Guests/Segments	"Kelly and Mark's Inbox"
June 1	Kelly Ripa & Mark Consuelos	Yes	Olivia Munn, Tony Hale, LIVE's Summer Survival Guide - Summer Foot Health	No
June 2	Kelly Ripa & Mark Consuelos	Yes	Marlon Wayans, Shrey Parikh, LIVE's Summer Survival Guide - Surviving Summer Bites	No
June 3	Kelly Ripa & Mark Consuelos	Yes	Tina Fey, Christian Siriano, LIVE's Summer Survival Guide - Avoiding Summer Sports Injuries	Yes
June 4	Kelly Ripa & Mark Consuelos	Yes	Anna Faris, Shopping Day Bargains, LIVE's Summer Survival Guide - Summer Skin Conditions	No
June 5	Kelly Ripa & Mark Consuelos	Yes	Nick Jonas, LIVE's Great American Cookout - Toni Chapman, LIVE's Summer Survival Guide - Staying Safe in the Heat	No
June 8	Kelly Ripa & Mark Consuelos	Yes	Laverne Cox, Eve Hewson, Avoiding AI Scams	No
June 9	Kelly Ripa & Mark Consuelos	Yes	Amy Adams, Jodie Comer, Career Advice at Any Stage	Yes
June 10	Kelly Ripa & Mark Consuelos	Yes	Questlove, Lucy Halliday, Marinated Lamb Chops Recipe	No
June 11	Kelly Ripa & Mark Consuelos	Yes	Jodie Turner-Smith, Murray Bartlett, Shopping Day Bargains	No
June 12	Kelly Ripa & Mark Consuelos	Yes	Colman Domingo, Tori Kelly, Gifts for Dads, LIVE's Great American Cookout - Suzy Karadsheh	No
June 15	Kelly Ripa & Mark Consuelos	Yes	Sarah Chalke, Summer Travel Tech Tips	Yes
June 22	Kelly Ripa & Mark Consuelos	Yes	William Stanford Davis, Shopping Day Bargains, Summer Savings Tips	Yes
June 29	Kelly Ripa & Mark Consuelos	Yes	Michelle Buteau, Mr. Fantasy, LIVE's Countdown to 250 - Fourth of July Word Jumble	No
June 30	Kelly Ripa & Mark Consuelos	Yes	Nina Dobrev, Billy Eichner, LIVE's Countdown to 250 - Fourth of July Party Tips	Yes

=== July 2026 ===
Date	Co-hosts	"Host Chat"	Guests/Segments	"Kelly and Mark's Inbox"
July 1	Kelly Ripa & Mark Consuelos	Yes	Law Roach, Caroline Rhea, LIVE's Countdown to 250 - Star-Spangled Banner Balloon Race	Yes
July 2	Kelly Ripa & Mark Consuelos	Yes	Olivia Holt, Shopping Day Bargains, LIVE's Countdown to 250 - Summer Movies Overview	Yes
July 3	Kelly Ripa & Mark Consuelos	Yes	LIVE's Stars and Stripes Celebration: 250 Edition: David Muir, Steve Patterson, LIVE's Great American Cookout - Andrew Zimmern, Stars & Stripes Games	No
July 6	Kelly Ripa & Mark Consuelos	Yes	Malachi Barton, Catherine Laga'aia, LIVE's Let's Get Physical Week - Dead Hang Challenge	No
July 7	Kelly Ripa & Mark Consuelos	Yes	Steve Wilkos, Bernadette Peters, LIVE's Let's Get Physical Week - Wall Splat Challenge	No
July 8	Kelly Ripa & Mark Consuelos	Yes	Kylie Cantrall, Robert Irwin, LIVE's Let's Get Physical Week - Sitting-Rising Test	No
July 9	Kelly Ripa & Mark Consuelos	Yes	Jim Parsons, Shopping Day Bargains, LIVE's Let's Get Physical Week - Grocery Bag Challenge	Yes
July 10	Kelly Ripa & Mark Consuelos	Yes	Phaedra Parks, LIVE's Let's Get Physical Week - Plank Challenge, LIVE's Great American Cookout - August DeWindt	No
July 13	Kelly Ripa & Mark Consuelos	Yes	Octavia Spencer, John Slattery, Ziggy Marley, LIVE's Hot Summer Bargains Week	No
July 14	Kelly Ripa & Mark Consuelos	Yes	Hannah Waddingham, Grace Potter, LIVE's Hot Summer Bargains Week	Yes
July 15	Kelly Ripa & Mark Consuelos	Yes	Anya Taylor-Joy, Fortune Feimster, LIVE's Hot Summer Bargains Week	Yes
July 16	Kelly Ripa & Mark Consuelos	Yes	Molly Shannon, Tori Kelly, LIVE's Hot Summer Bargains Week	Yes
July 17	Kelly Ripa & Mark Consuelos	Yes	Matt Damon, LIVE's Hot Summer Bargains Week, LIVE's Great American Cookout - Melba Wilson	No
July 20	Kelly Ripa & Mark Consuelos	Yes	Leslie Jones, Minka Kelly, Teriyaki Bratwurst Recipe, LIVE's Adulting Week - Finance Fundamentals	No
July 21	Kelly Ripa & Mark Consuelos	Yes	Lauren Cohan, Wyclef Jean, LIVE's Adulting Week - DIY Home Skills	Yes
July 22	Kelly Ripa & Mark Consuelos	Yes	Tom Holland, Pamela Adlon, LIVE's Adulting Week - Kitchen Smarts	No
July 23	Kelly Ripa & Mark Consuelos	Yes	Josh Duhamel, Shopping Day Bargains, Dog Tips 101, LIVE's Adulting Week - Laundry Lessons	No
July 24	Kelly Ripa & Mark Consuelos	Yes	Tracee Ellis Ross, Luke Bracey, LIVE's Adulting Week - Healthcare Tips, LIVE's Great American Cookout - Gelman	No
July 27	Mark Consuelos & Kevin Jonas	Yes	Common, Mary Beth Barone, LIVE's Ultimate Home Hacker Week - Phone Tricks	Yes
July 28	Mark Consuelos & Kevin Jonas	Yes	Joe Buck, Lacey Chabert, LIVE's Ultimate Home Hacker Week - Outdoor & Pool Hacks	Yes
July 29	Mark Consuelos & Mila Kunis	Yes	Jeffrey Dean Morgan, Ice-T, LIVE's Ultimate Home Hacker Week - Household Cleaning Hacks	Yes
July 30	Mark Consuelos & Pamela Adlon	Yes	John David Washington, K. Michelle, Shopping Day Bargains	No
July 31	Mark Consuelos & Scott Foley	Yes	Andrew Garfield, Max Greenfield, LIVE's Ultimate Home Hacker Week - Meat Hacks, LIVE's Great American Cookout - Matt Groark	Yes

=== August 2026 ===
Date	Co-hosts	"Host Chat"	Guests/Segments	"Kelly and Mark's Inbox"
August 3	Mark Consuelos & Sara Chalke	Yes	Garcelle Beauvais, Isa Briones	Yes
August 4	Mark Consuelos & Jenna Dewan	Yes	Mason Gooding, Shopping Day Bargains, A Great Big World	No
August 5	Mark Consuelos & Kristen Doute	Yes	Chrissy Metz, Cristo Fernández, Shopping Day Bargains	No
August 6	Mark Consuelos & Michelle Buteau	Yes	Walt Willey, Patina Miller, Shopping Day Bargains	No
August 7	Mark Consuelos & Carrie Coon	Yes	Emmy Rossum, Shopping Day Bargains, LIVE's Great American Cookout - Alex Guarnaschelli	No
August 10	Kelly Ripa & Mark Consuelos	Yes	Teresa Giudice, Gut Health Tips	Yes
August 17	Kelly Ripa & Mark Consuelos	Yes	Mark Ballas, Kyle Richards	Yes
August 24	Kelly Ripa & Mark Consuelos	Yes	Gordon Ramsay, Crafty Vacation Keepsakes, Amy Grant	Yes
August 31	Kelly Ripa & Mark Consuelos	Yes	Jon Batiste, Liza Colón-Zayas, Tips for Breathing Better	No

== Season 39 (2026–) ==
=== September 2026 ===
Date	Co-hosts	"Host chat"	Guests / segments	"Kelly and Mark's Inbox"
September 7	Kelly Ripa & Mark Consuelos	Yes	Curtis "50 Cent" Jackson, Misty Copeland, Rediscovering What You Love About Your Job	No
September 8	Kelly Ripa & Mark Consuelos	Yes	Lizzo, Kal Penn, Tift Merritt, Kelly & Mark 4Ever Week	Yes
September 9	Kelly Ripa & Mark Consuelos	Yes	Gal Gadot, Personality Puzzle Challenge, Kelly & Mark 4Ever Week	No
September 10	Kelly Ripa & Mark Consuelos	Yes	Sandra Bullock, Sherri Shepherd, Steven Curtis Chapman, Shopping Day Bargains, Kelly & Mark 4Ever Week	No
September 14	Kelly Ripa & Mark Consuelos	Yes	Salma Hayek Pinault, Alexander Zverev, Hoobastank, Kelly & Mark Do It Again Week - Marshmallow Golf Challenge	No
September 15	Kelly Ripa & Mark Consuelos	Yes	Joel McHale, Neil deGrasse Tyson, Kelly & Mark Do It Again Week - Handstand Challenge	Yes
September 16	Kelly Ripa & Mark Consuelos	Yes	Jane Krakowski, Sharon Horgan, Kelly & Mark Do It Again Week - Superman Challenge	Yes
September 17	Kelly Ripa & Mark Consuelos	Yes	Alan Cumming, Paula Cole, Shopping Day Bargains, Kelly & Mark Do It Again Week - I Scream for Ice Cream Challenge	No
September 18	Kelly Ripa & Mark Consuelos	Yes	Theo James, Carson Kressley, Kelly & Mark Do It Again Week - Flour Power Challenge	No
September 21	Kelly Ripa & Mark Consuelos	Yes	Blair Underwood, Jeff Probst, Ashley Cooke, LIVE's Fall for Your Skin Week - Tips for Preventing Neck Aging	No
September 22	Kelly Ripa & Mark Consuelos	Yes	Jessica Lange, Dolph Lundgren, LIVE's Fall for Your Skin Week - Diet Changes for Anti-Aging	No
September 23	Kelly Ripa & Mark Consuelos	Yes	Chelsea Handler, Drew Baldridge, LIVE's Fall for Your Skin Week - Breakouts	Yes
September 24	Kelly Ripa & Mark Consuelos	Yes	John Hamm, Gabourey Sidibe, Shopping Day Bargains, LIVE's Fall for Your Skin Week - Hormones & Your Skin	No
September 25	Kelly Ripa & Mark Consuelos	Yes	Angela Bassett, H. E. R., LIVE's Fall for Your Skin Week - Skin Sensitivities	Yes
September 28	Kelly Ripa & Mark Consuelos	Yes	Mark Duplass, Mauricio Umansky, LIVE's Fall Flavors Week - Calabrese-Influenced Lasagna	Yes
September 29	Kelly Ripa & Mark Consuelos	Yes	Josh Charles, Eric Idle, LIVE's Fall Flavors Week - Sheet Pan Vegetable Soup	Yes
September 30	Kelly Ripa & Mark Consuelos	Yes	Zach Braff, Shemar Moore, LIVE's Fall Flavors Week - One-Pot Apple and Fennel Chicken Orzo	No

=== October 2026 ===
Date	Co-hosts	"Host chat"	Guests / segments	"Kelly and Mark's Inbox"
October 1	Kelly Ripa & Mark Consuelos	Yes	Josh Hartnett, Shopping Day Bargains, LIVE's Fall Flavors Week - Black Eyed Peas Stew	Yes
October 2	Kelly Ripa & Mark Consuelos	Yes	Florence Pugh, Donald Faison, Kelly's Birthday Surprise, LIVE's Fall Flavors Week - Pumpkin and Apple Empanadas	No
October 5	Kelly Ripa & Mark Consuelos	Yes	Chris Rock, Heather Gay, Tips on Planning for Retirement	No
October 6	Kelly Ripa & Mark Consuelos	Yes	John Goodman, Bill Burr	Yes
October 7	Kelly Ripa & Mark Consuelos	Yes	Noah Centineo, Billie Lourd, Lauren Alaina	Yes
October 8	Kelly Ripa & Mark Consuelos	Yes	Allison Janney, Wynonna Judd, Shopping Day Bargains, Dr. Holly Phillips	Yes
October 9	Kelly Ripa & Mark Consuelos	Yes	Josh Brolin, Hoon Lee, Fall Face-Off	No
October 12	Kelly Ripa & Mark Consuelos	Yes	Tom Ellis, Marilu Henner, LIVE's Adopt a Dog Week - Walking & Socializing Tips	Yes
October 13	Kelly Ripa & Mark Consuelos	Yes	Sylvester Stallone, Rufus Sewell, Baked Fall Vegetable Salad Recipe, LIVE's Adopt a Dog Week	No
October 14	Kelly Ripa & Mark Consuelos	Yes	Chandra Wilson, Ryan Phillippe, Andy Grammer, LIVE's Adopt a Dog Week - Picking the Right Dog for Your Lifestyle	No
October 15	Kelly Ripa & Mark Consuelos	Yes	Luke Grimes, Bill Ritter, Shopping Day Bargains, LIVE's Adopt a Dog Week	No
October 16	Kelly Ripa & Mark Consuelos	Yes	Bradley Whitford, Tips to Manage Holiday Stress, LIVE's Adopt a Dog Week - Tips on Discipling Your Dog	Yes
October 19	Kelly Ripa & Mark Consuelos	Yes	Quinta Brunson, Jackie Tohn, LIVE's Halloween Flashback Week	Yes
October 20	Kelly Ripa & Mark Consuelos	Yes	Connie Britton, Wyclef Jean, LIVE's Halloween Flashback Week	Yes
October 21	Kelly Ripa & Mark Consuelos	Yes	Andy Cohen, Giancarlo Esposito, LIVE's Halloween Flashback Week	Yes
October 22	Kelly Ripa & Mark Consuelos	Yes	Anna Camp, Jane Leeves, Shopping Day Bargains, LIVE's Halloween Flashback Week	Yes
October 23	Kelly Ripa & Mark Consuelos	Yes	Téa Leoni, Adam Brody, Last-Minute Halloween Costumes, LIVE's Halloween Flashback Week	Yes
October 26	Kelly Ripa & Mark Consuelos	Yes	LIVE's Halloween Vault: Reality TV Edition	No
October 27	Kelly Ripa & Mark Consuelos	Yes	Scott Speedman, Tim Daly, LIVE's Countdown to Halloween Eve Week - No-Carve Pumpkins	Yes
October 28	Kelly Ripa & Mark Consuelos	Yes	Paul Anthony Kelly, O. A. R., LIVE's Countdown to Halloween Eve Week - Science Bob	Yes
October 29	Kelly Ripa & Mark Consuelos	Yes	Liev Schreiber, Justin Hartley, Shopping Day Bargains, LIVE's Countdown to Halloween Eve Week - Pro Pumpkin Carving Tips	No
October 30	Kelly Ripa & Mark Consuelos	Yes	LIVE's Halloween Shockin’ Eve: Lisa Rinna, Jerry O'Connell, Kal Penn, LIVE's Halloween Costume Contest	No

=== November 2026 ===
Date	Co-hosts	"Host chat"	Guests / segments	"Kelly and Mark's Inbox"
November 2	Kelly Ripa & Mark Consuelos	Yes	Tony Goldwyn, LIVE's Halloween Behind-the-Scenes, LIVE's Under Pressure Week - Pressure Points	No
November 3	Kelly Ripa & Mark Consuelos	Yes	Emma Roberts, Justine Lupe, LIVE's Under Pressure Week - Anti-Stress Foods & Supplements	No
November 4	Kelly Ripa & Mark Consuelos	Yes	Sarah Paulson, Joanne McNally, LIVE's Under Pressure Week - Easing Financial Pressure & Anxiety	Yes
November 5	Kelly Ripa & Mark Consuelos	Yes	Hailee Steinfeld, Shopping Day Bargains, LIVE's Under Pressure Week - Destress Your Tech	Yes
November 6	Kelly Ripa & Mark Consuelos	Yes	Naomi Watts, John Cena, LIVE's Under Pressure Week - Stress Relief Through Fitness	No
November 9	Kelly Ripa & Mark Consuelos	Yes	David Muir, Walker Scobell, Get a Jump on Black Friday Bargains, LIVE’s Less is More Week - Recognizing Kitchen Staples	No
November 10	Kelly Ripa & Mark Consuelos	Yes	Chris O'Donnell, Andie MacDowell, Get a Jump on Black Friday Bargains, LIVE’s Less is More Week - Tips for Traveling Efficiently	No
November 11	Kelly Ripa & Mark Consuelos	Yes	Cynthia Nixon, Sam Nivola, Get a Jump on Black Friday Bargains, LIVE’s Less is More Week - Tips for Capsule Dressing	Yes
November 12	Kelly Ripa & Mark Consuelos	Yes	Owen Wilson, Jessica Capshaw, Get a Jump on Black Friday Bargains, LIVE’s Less is More Week - Tips for Spending Less	Yes
November 13	Kelly Ripa & Mark Consuelos	Yes	Kathryn Hahn, Jon Favreau, Get a Jump on Black Friday Bargains, LIVE’s Less is More Week - Tips for Simplifying Your Home	No
November 16	Kelly Ripa & Mark Consuelos	Yes	LIVE! in St. Pete-Clearwater, FL: Patrick Wilson, David Foster & Katharine McPhee, Mark's Hometown Tour	No
November 17	Kelly Ripa & Mark Consuelos	Yes	LIVE! in St. Pete-Clearwater, FL: Sarah Chalke, Beach Ball Bonanza, Steve Patterson Tours Instagrammable Sights	No
November 18	Kelly Ripa & Mark Consuelos	Yes	LIVE! in St. Pete-Clearwater, FL: Lacey Chabert, Wendi McLendon-Covey, Jason Derulo, History of Clearwater, FL	No
November 19	Kelly Ripa & Mark Consuelos	Yes	LIVE! in St. Pete-Clearwater, FL: Bert Kreischer, Busta Rhymes & Common, Kelly Goes Sailing	No
November 20	Kelly Ripa & Mark Consuelos	Yes	Wilmer Valderamma, John Turturro, Mark Trains with the Tampa Bay Buccaneers, LIVE's Big Deal Day	No
November 23	Kelly Ripa & Mark Consuelos	Yes	Rosamund Pike, Emayatzy Corinealdi, LIVE's Thanksgiving Cooking Week - Suzy Karadsheh	No
November 24	Kelly Ripa & Mark Consuelos	Yes	Tracy Morgan, Hayley Atwell, LIVE's Thanksgiving Cooking Week - Carleigh Bodrug	No
November 25	Kelly Ripa & Mark Consuelos	Yes	Nate Bargatze, Shopping Day Bargains, LIVE's Thanksgiving Cooking Week - Shereen Pavlides	No
November 30	Kelly Ripa & Mark Consuelos	Yes	TBA	No

=== December 2026 ===
Date	Co-hosts	"Host chat"	Guests / segments	"Kelly and Mark's Inbox"
December 1	Kelly Ripa & Mark Consuelos	Yes	Akwafina	No
December 2	Kelly Ripa & Mark Consuelos	Yes	TBA	No
December 3	Kelly Ripa & Mark Consuelos	Yes	TBA	No
December 4	Kelly Ripa & Mark Consuelos	Yes	TBA, Shopping Day Bargains, Tips for Hosting Holiday Overnight Guests	No
December 7	Kelly Ripa & Mark Consuelos	Yes	TBA	No
December 8	Kelly Ripa & Mark Consuelos	Yes	TBA, LIVE's Gift Bargains Week	No
December 9	Kelly Ripa & Mark Consuelos	Yes	TBA, LIVE's Gift Bargains Week	No
December 10	Kelly Ripa & Mark Consuelos	Yes	TBA, LIVE's Gift Bargains Week	No
December 11	Kelly Ripa & Mark Consuelos	Yes	TBA, LIVE's Gift Bargains Week	No
December 14	Kelly Ripa & Mark Consuelos	Yes	TBA, LIVE's Gift Bargains Week	No
December 15	Kelly Ripa & Mark Consuelos	Yes	TBA, LIVE's Eat, Drink & Be Merry Week - Kelly's Figgy Pudding Recipe	Yes
December 16	Kelly Ripa & Mark Consuelos	Yes	TBA, LIVE's Eat, Drink & Be Merry Week - Dave Mullen's Crumb Cake Recipe	No
December 17	Kelly Ripa & Mark Consuelos	Yes	TBA, LIVE's Eat, Drink & Be Merry Week - Déjà's Mini-Quiche Recipe	No
December 18	Kelly Ripa & Mark Consuelos	Yes	LIVE's Holiday Sweater Party: TBA, Holiday Sweater Fashion Show	No
December 21	Kelly Ripa & Mark Consuelos	Yes	TBA	Yes
December 22	Kelly Ripa & Mark Consuelos	Yes	TBA	Yes
December 23	Kelly Ripa & Mark Consuelos	Yes	TBA, Last-Minute DIY Gift Ideas	Yes
December 24	Kelly Ripa & Mark Consuelos	Yes	LIVE's Holiday House Party: John Stamos, Radio City Rockettes, Steve Patterson, Train, Santa, LIVE's Holiday Memories	No
December 28	Kelly Ripa & Mark Consuelos	Yes	TBA	Yes
December 29	Kelly Ripa & Mark Consuelos	Yes	TBA	Yes
December 30	Kelly Ripa & Mark Consuelos	Yes	TBA	Yes
