= Ryan Chen =

Chinese impressionist and social media celebrity (born c. 1982)

- 陳睿
- Born: Chen Rui; 1982 or 1983 (age 43); Chongqing, China
- Occupations: Actor, comedian, director, business manager, tour guide
- Years active: 2024–present
- Known for: "Chinese Trump"

Chen Rui (Chinese: 陳睿; pinyin: Chén Ruì; born c. 1982), known online as Ryan Chen, is a Chinese impressionist and social media personality. He gained attention in 2024 for videos impersonating President Donald Trump, which went viral on Chinese social media platforms. Chen has also been interviewed by Western media outlets, including NBC News, CNN, and the New York Times.

== Background and education ==
Chen Rui was born around 1982 as an only child in a working-class family. His father worked in shipping on the Yangtze River, and his mother worked in a government-run textile factory. He learned English in high school and from watching American television shows while attending university in Chengdu, Sichuan province. In 2024, following a bet with a friend, Chen posted a video of himself performing a Trump impression on Douyin, the Chinese equivalent of TikTok.

== Career ==
While working as a marketing manager in Chongqing in 2020, Chen started uploading videos to social media. He initially created vlogs on lifestyle topics, including dieting which gained a modest following. He later produced English-teaching videos under the name BrotherRyanEnglish, which were more successful.

Following the 2024 U.S. presidential election, Chen expanded his repertoire to include impressions of other American political figures, such as Presidents Biden and Obama, and Vice President JD Vance. He posts content on platforms including Instagram and other U.S.-based social media. Chen has cited American impressionist Matt Friend as an influence.

Although he is sometimes referred to as the "Chinese Trump," Chen avoids political commentary. He focuses on entertainment content, including promotion of Chinese cities, cuisine, culture, and travel, delivered in Trump-like mannerisms. He has stated that he deliberately avoids sensitive political topics in both China and the U.S.

Chen has collaborated with figures such as Olympian Wang Guan and American social media creator Darren Jason Watkins, known online as IShowSpeed. Before January 2026, he had not visited the United States. Chen employs an assistant for his social media work and continues to work as business manager at an architectural design company in Chongqing.

== Reception ==
Chen has millions of followers in China, including approximately 1.3 million on Douyin as of late 2025, and maintains a following internationally including in Spain, Germany, and the Philippines. In early 2025, concerns over a potential U.S. ban on TikTok led some American users to seek content on Chinese platforms. Chen's videos have occasionally been reposted without permission, prompting him to issue a cease-and-desist notice.

Chen has been covered by media outlets including NBC News, CNN, and the New York Times His impressions have been described as "pitch-perfect" by the New York Times.
