= Matt Friend =

American stand-up comedian, actor, voice actor, and impressionist

- Born: Matthew Jonas Friend; June 24, 1998 (age 28); Chicago, Illinois, U.S.
- Education: New York University

Comedy career
- Years active: 2018–present
- Medium: Stand-up, television
- Genres: Impersonations, character comedy, Jewish culture, American culture, political comedy, current events, pop culture
- Website: https://www.mattfriend.com/

Matthew Jonas Friend (born June 24, 1998) is an American stand-up comedian, actor, commentator, voice actor, and impressionist. He is primarily known for his celebrity impressions, including Donald Trump, Barack Obama, Mitch McConnell, Jeff Goldblum, Howard Stern, Bill Maher, JD Vance, Stanley Tucci, among others.

His stand-up performances combine impersonations, observational humour and crowd work.

== Early life ==
Friend grew up in Chicago, Illinois and attended the Francis W. Parker School, taking acting classes at The Second City as a kid. He is Jewish. He originally attended Tufts University (like his father, who was roommates with Hank Azaria there) for one year before transferring to New York University, partially because he wanted to be in New York City for its comedy and media scene. Friend cited Mike Myers, Don Rickles, Rich Little, and Johnny Carson as notable influences.

== Career ==
While at NYU's Gallatin School of Individualized Study, Friend was a production intern at The Tonight Show Starring Jimmy Fallon. In 2023, Friend's impressions began to garner significant social media attention. He began performing these impressions both on live television and for audiences on TikTok, Snapchat, and Instagram. John Stamos discovered him on TikTok early in the pandemic and has been a mentor/advocate for his career. In 2025, Ryan Chen (The Chinese Trump) cited him as an influence.

In March 2023, Friend signed with the United Talent Agency. A year later, he performed at the White House Correspondents' Dinner in April 2024.

== Filmography ==
=== Film ===
Year	Title	Role	Notes
2023	Good Burger 2	Serious Waiter	

=== Television ===
Year	Title	Role	Notes
2019	How to Sell Drugs Online (Fast)	Mark Zuckerberg	Episode: "If This Is Reality, I'm Not Interested"
2022	A Very Cold War Christmas	Tucker Carlson, Mitch McConnell	TV short; voice
2022–23	The Simpsons	Jimmy Fallon, Baby Jeff Goldblum	2 episodes; voice
2024	The Late Show with Stephen Colbert	Donald Trump, Robert F. Kennedy Jr., Hunter Biden, Mitch McConnell	Episode: "Edward Norton"
2024	What If...?	The Grandmaster	Episode: "What If... Howard the Duck Got Hitched?"; voice
2024–25	Family Guy	Jeff Goldblum, Jared Fogle, Stanley Tucci, Howard Stern, Charles Dickens	5 episodes; voice
