= Déjà Vu (radio personality) =

American radio personality

Déjà Vu Parker, better known as DéjáVuSpeaks, is a radio personality and motivational speaker. She was born in Jacksonville, Florida and grew up there. She is the announcer for the daily national syndicated series Live with Kelly and Mark, and she co-hosts "The Quake's House Afternoon Show” on WBLS (107.5) in Manhattan, New York.

== Career ==
Parker began her career as an assistant program and music director in Jacksonville, her hometown. In 1999, she worked as the midday host, program director, and music director at 100.3 The Beat in Bridgeton, Missouri west of St. Louis. She moved to New York and joined Power 105.1 as a midday personality, where she remained for eight years.

She hosts the "Quake’s House Afternoon Show" at WBLS, which was purchased by Emmis Communications in Indianapolis in February 2014. She is the co-host of "Quake’s House Afternoon Show" which features WBLS personality Earthquake. "Quake’s House Afternoon Show" runs Monday to Friday from 3pm to 7pm. Both hosts combine comedy, their love for New York City, and R&B music. Parker is also an on-air personality for SiriusXM station "The Heat", Saturdays from 10am to 1pm, where she plays popular R&B and hip-hop hits in addition to interviewing many celebrities. Parker is the co-host of The Heat's Countdown The HOTNESS every Saturday from 10am to 1pm as she plays new music and throwback tunes. She is the announcer and a fill-in co-host (Note: Last-minute if one or both co-hosts is unable to host due to vacation or illness) of Live with Kelly and Mark.

== Community service ==
She is involved in community service throughout the tri-state area through her own non-profit organization, The Flava Unit Teen Community Group. The program works with high school students throughout the five New York boroughs to complete two services projects each month. Parker makes a point to bring The Flava Unit to each radio market for which she has worked.
