= Melba Wilson =

American restaurateur, caterer, cookbook author, and Food Network personality

- Born: Harlem, New York, USA
- Relatives: Sylvia Woods (aunt)
- Culinary career
- Cooking style: Soul food
- Current restaurant: Melba's (2005-present)

Melba Wilson is a Harlem-based restaurateur (Melba's), caterer, cookbook author and a Food Network personality.

Wilson has been called both the queen of soul food and comfort food.

Bill de Blasio appointed Wilson to the COVID-19 Small Business Advisory Council and she is president of the board of directors for The NYC Hospitality Alliance.

== Biography ==
Wilson is the niece of Sylvia Woods, the founder of Sylvia's Restaurant of Harlem. She was hired to organize the restaurant's 25th anniversary celebration in 1987. Wilson is credited with starting their popular Sunday gospel brunch. She went on to work at Windows on the World and Rosa Mexicano before opening Melba's in 2005.

== TV appearances ==
As well as appearing on the Food Network shows Beat Bobby Flay, Worst Cooks in America, and Throwdown! with Bobby Flay (the latter in which her chicken and waffles dish beat Flay's in season 4), Wilson has appeared on shows such as 60 Minutes and The View.

== Publications ==
- Melba's American Comfort: 100 Recipes From My Heart to Your Kitchen (2016)
