= Guillermo Rodríguez =

Guillermo Rodríguez may refer to:

- Guillermo Rodríguez (baseball) (born 1978), Venezuelan baseball catcher
- Guillermo Rodríguez (footballer) (born 1984), Uruguayan footballer
- Guillermo Rodríguez (athlete) (1925–2002), Mexican Olympic sprinter
- Guillermo Rodríguez (politician), also known as Guillermo Rodríguez Lara (born 1923), Ecuadorian politician
- Guillermo Rodríguez González (born 1960), Spanish archer
- Guillermo Rodriguez (comedian) (born 1971), Recurring cast member of Jimmy Kimmel Live!
