= Straw Hat Goofy =

American TikToker (born 1992)

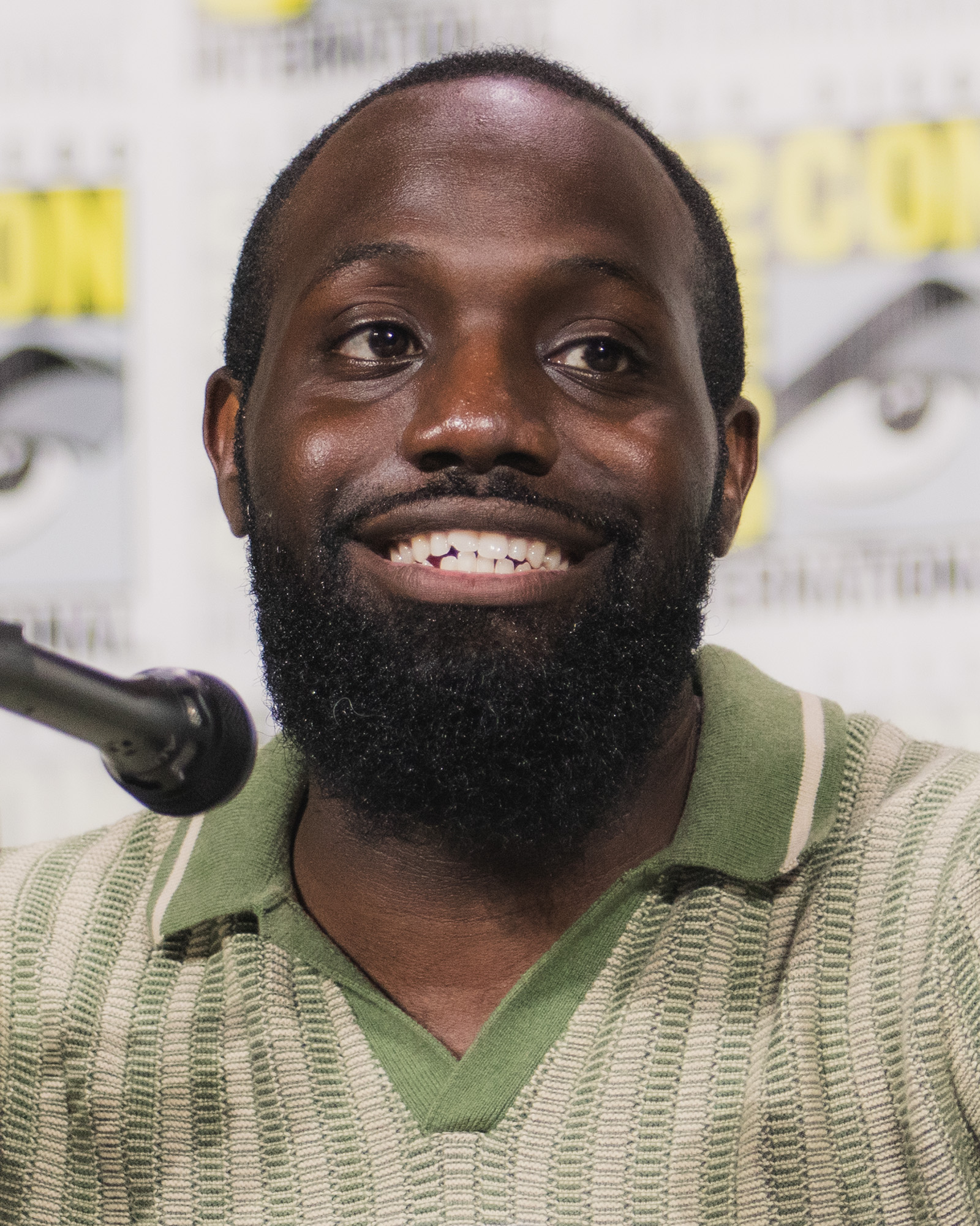
- Straw Hat Goofy in 2026
- Born: Juju Green; January 27, 1992 (age 34)
- Occupations: Advertising, TikToker
- Years active: 2020–present
- Known for: Film reviews

Juju Green (born January 27, 1992) is an American TikToker who reviews and analyzes films as his main platform. Known on TikTok as Straw Hat Goofy, he has made several film reviews and gained a following of 3.5 million by October 2024.

== Early life ==
Juju Green worked as an advertising copywriter at 72andSunny. In 2016, Green created a YouTube account in which he discussed videos. However, he went on to have a child, leading him to stop posting to the web site. In 2020, Green had started posting on TikTok and had a video in which he discussed Tom Holland's performance in Avengers: Endgame (2019) go viral.

== TikTok career ==
Green began to develop his reputation and branding as the "Movie Guy" of TikTok as he built his audience making film reviews. He began to accept several brand deals to advertise to his audience from major studios and streaming web sites, as well as other companies such as Walmart, Hasbro, Verizon, Variety, Hotels.com, and Hulu. Although he worked to balance his careers in advertising and TikTok for a time, Green eventually left his advertising job. He then accepted more brand deals, including one in which he posted at a National Football League game about the movie M3GAN (2022). The New York Times credited this promotion as a significant contributor to the film earning thirty percent more than box office analysts predicted.

His most popular video was one in which he identified Easter eggs in Pixar movies, garnering 29 million views. His popularity on the app led him to be one several influencers to part with the 94th Academy Awards. He was also one of several people on Good Morning America who were involved in the announcement of the nominees for the 95th Academy Awards. Academy CEO Bill Kramer described the inclusion of notable influencers such as Green as an attempt to stay relevant. Such a large influence led Green to be listed by TikTok on their Showbiz List of creators who were making waves in the film industry.

In 2023, Green was cast as the voice of the gym teacher in the computer-animated teen comedy film Ruby Gillman, Teenage Kraken, which was his feature film acting debut. And as part of the cast, he walked on the purple carpet at the Los Angeles premiere of the movie at the TCL Chinese Theatre.

Green has been the subject of multiple controversies throughout his career as a content creator. In the midst of a larger debate occurring about whether such content creators should be welcome at red carpet premieres, Green attended the premiere for the Film Independent Spirit Awards. There, he filmed a video using the "when your card declines in therapy" meme along with video he had taken of Lily Gladstone, who was starring in Killers of the Flower Moon (2023). He garnered significant criticism for this from people who saw it as insensitive and later deleted the video.

In another controversy, during the 2023 SAG-AFTRA strike, Green posted a video in which he said he would continue to work with struck companies, striking another controversy as the video was reshared on other social media platforms, including X. Green later said in an interview that he had made a mistake, turning down eight proposals from struck companies and claiming he would continue to do so throughout the duration of the strikes and said that he would consider joining the union upon learning about their influencer agreement.

== Podcasts ==
Green worked on a podcast known as "Geeks of the Week" alongside Megan Cruz.

Inspired by a conversation with Ryan Coogler, Green started a podcast which he titled Get Rec'd, in which he had conversations with various celebrities, including Halle Berry, Anya Taylor-Joy, Chris Hemsworth, Kingsley Ben-Adir, Chris Sanders, Daniel Kaluuya, David Dastmalchian, Walker Scobell, Hudson Thames, and Coogler..This led to him signing a deal with the Creative Artists Agency.

== Personal life ==
Green identified his favorite films as Her (2013), The Shawshank Redemption (1994), Your Name (2016), and Spider-Man 2 (2004).
