= Princess (The Walking Dead) =

- The Walking Dead character
- First appearance: Comics: "Issue #171" (2017); Television: "Look at the Flowers" (2020)
- Last appearance: Comics: "Issue #193" (2019); Television: "Rest in Peace" (2022)
- Created by: Robert Kirkman
- Portrayed by: Paola Lázaro

In-universe information
- Species: Human
- Gender: Female
- Occupation: Record Store Employee; Retail Employee; Coffee Shop Employee; High School Student; Former General Store Clerk at the Commonwealth
- Weapon: Machine Gun
- Family: Unnamed Stepbrother; Comics: Unnamed Stepfather; Unnamed Pet
- Significant other: Michael Mercer (boyfriend)
- Nationality: Puerto Rican-American

Juanita "Princess" Sanchez is a fictional character from the comic book series The Walking Dead and the television series of the same name, where she is portrayed by Paola Lázaro.

== Comic book series ==
Juanita "Princess" Sanchez is a lone survivor residing in Pittsburgh and claims to have not seen any survivors in around a year. She is an eccentric survivor of a zombie apocalypse who dyes her hair several different colors and wears brightly colored, flamboyant clothes such as riding pants, aviator goggles, and feather boas as she helps her fellow survivors fight against zombies and other, malevolent survivor factions.

== Television series ==
=== Season 10 ===
In the episode "Look at the Flowers", within the city, after discovering a tableau of walkers arranged in humorous situations, Ezekiel, Eugene, and Yumiko encounter a young woman excited to see them. In the episode "The Tower", Princess introduces herself to the new arrivals, but is interrupted by the arrival of a group of walkers. Before they can stop her, Princess puts down the walkers with a machine gun, which frightens their horses away. Princess apologizes and says she knows where they can get transportation. As Ezekiel's group walks across the city, the trio finds Princess' directions to be erratic. At one point, they walk through a live minefield where they find the remains of their horses; Eugene later realizes they could have taken a much quicker route. Princess again apologizes, admitting she has been alone for so long and only wanted to endear herself to them. She takes them to a garage with transportation: bicycles. The trio prepares to depart for their meeting with Stephanie. Yumiko, frustrated with Princess, has a change of heart and allows her to join the group.

In the second part finale "A Certain Doom", at night, Eugene's group has finally reached the trainyard which was designated as the intended rendezvous point to meet Stephanie. After suffering a bicycle crash earlier, Eugene initially believes he has missed his meeting with Stephanie, but declares they will continue to go looking for her after being inspired by Ezekiel. The group is then suddenly accosted by a large group of heavily armed soldiers wearing white and red body armor. The soldiers order them, at gunpoint, to drop their weapons and get on their knees.

In the episode "Splinter", Princess, Eugene, Ezekiel, and Yumiko are surrounded by several of the armed soldiers. As she struggles against her captors, Princess watches as Yumiko is hit hard on the head by a soldier with a rifle; the group is separated from each other and imprisoned in boxcars. While in captivity, Princess tries to break the wooden walls separating her and Yumiko, but gets a splinter in her finger, triggering her PTSD. To keep the concussed Yumiko awake, Princess tells her about her unhappy childhood being abused by her stepfather and stepbrother, while her mother did nothing to protect her. Just then, soldiers arrive and take Yumiko away. The next day, Princess discovers an exit to Eugene's boxcar, but he dismisses her and tells her to return to her boxcar so they can appear worthy of the community's time by following their orders; Princess obeys. Later, a soldier summons her to come with him. Once she is checked for bite marks by an examining trooper, Princess is taken into another room to be interrogated by another trooper about her group. However, Princess refuses to cooperate unless she can see Yumiko; the soldier slaps her and knocks her to the ground. Princess later wakes up in her boxcar and sneaks out again to see Eugene only to find that he is gone. She returns to her boxcar and panics. Suddenly, Ezekiel opens the hatch in the roof and jumps down, and the two argue over what to do next. Soon afterward, a soldier enters the boxcar with a tray of food, but is ambushed by Ezekiel, who knocks him unconscious and then handcuffs him. Princess interrogates the soldier with Ezekiel, eventually attacking and beating him, before Princess realizes that she was hallucinating Ezekiel the entire time, and she is beating the still fettered soldier. She then escapes from her boxcar and is faced with another hallucination of Ezekiel, who tries to convince her to flee and leave the others behind; she refuses and returns to her boxcar. There, Princess frees the beaten soldier and answers his questions in exchange for seeing her friends. The soldier thanks her and knocks on the door and yells to his squad outside. Immediately, the door slides open, revealing Eugene, Ezekiel, and Yumiko lined up outside with hoods on their heads, guarded by soldiers; a hood is thrown over Princess' head.

=== Season 11 ===
In the season premiere "Acheron: Part I", Princess, Eugene, Ezekiel, Yumiko, are transported into a compound guarded by paramilitary troopers. The group is separated and interrogated for hours by two Commonwealth auditors, Clark and Evans, while Michael Mercer, the General of the Commonwealth Army, observes. When reunited at the detainment center, the group decides they need to escape. Princess reveals that two of the guards regularly disappear for a half hour, leaving their armor behind. During this window, Eugene and Yumiko steal the trooper uniforms, and escort Ezekiel and Princess out of the compound. On the way out, the group passes a wall with photos of missing people. Princess recognizes Yumiko in one of the photos, with a note from Yumiko's long-lost brother, Tomi, asking if anyone has seen her. In the episode "Acheron: Part II", at the Commonwealth, Yumiko, Eugene, and Princess discuss Ezekiel's disappearance, with Yumiko leaving to be interviewed by the auditors. A wagon later transports Eugene to a boxcar, where he is reunited with Yumiko, Princess, and Ezekiel. Mercer then tells the group that they have successfully completed processing and will be escorted to orientation.

In the episode "Out of the Ashes", at the Commonwealth, Eugene, Ezekiel, Princess, and Yumiko watch an introductory video on VHS and are given their job assignments and housing information. Eugene tells Stephanie that he would like to radio back to his group at home, but Stephanie reveals that the radios are government property and that getting authorization to use them is a long and complicated process. They come up with a plan to gain access to the radios secretly, but shortly after making contact with Rosita, they are cut off and arrested. Eugene, Princess and Ezekiel are threatened with deportation from the Commonwealth, but Stephanie calls in a favor to save them. In the episode "Promises Broken", Princess, Eugene, and Ezekiel clear walkers out of abandoned buildings with Stephanie as punishment for using the radio without authorization. Princess pressures Ezekiel, who is suffering from thyroid cancer, to go to the hospital.

In the episode "Rogue Element", Princess encourages Eugene to pursue a relationship with Stephanie. When she disappears, Eugene believes she has been kidnapped, but Princess tells him that she simply broke up with him and to let her go. Undeterred, Eugene asks Princess to help him follow Roman Calhoun, who he is convinced has kidnapped Stephanie, and they find his cache of weapons. They are arrested for breaking and entering, but Hornsby has them released and Stephanie reveals her true identity: Maxxine "Max" Mercer, General Mercer's sister and Commonwealth Governor Pamela Milton's secretary and spy.

In the episode "Trust" it is revealed that Princess is in a relationship with Mercer. However, his men arrest Princess on Milton's order to draw out Eugene, whom Milton has framed for the death of her son, Sebastian. In the episode "Variant", Princess confronts Mercer, demanding to know how he can help Milton frame an innocent man and saying that the Commonwealth means nothing if such a travesty of justice can happen within it. When Mercer says that things could be worse, Princess replies that she wants something more than "the best of a bad situation", and leaves. In the following episode, "Acts of God", however, she is arrested and imprisoned in the Commonwealth jail, along with Ezekiel and Negan.

In the episode "Faith", Princess joins Ezekiel and several other prisoners in preventing the jail's warden from executing Negan and then leading a rebellion and escaping. In the episode "Family", she radios Mercer, who gives her directions to a secret access tunnel that leads to the center of the Commonwealth.

In the series finale, "Rest in Peace", Princess joins the others in saving the Commonwealth from a herd of zombies and overthrowing Milton. A year later, she is living happily with Mercer, who governs the Commonwealth as Ezekiel's second-in-command, in a better, more peaceful world.

== Development and reception ==
Paola Lázaro was cast as Juanita "Princess" Sanchez, a quirky and flamboyant survivor who has suffered various traumas in her past. The episode "Look at the Flowers" introduces Princess, a character adapted from the comic book series. She is shown to still be a survivor that has been in complete isolation and developed quirky ways to deal with her solitude. Within the comics, Princess' introduction begins the final major arc of the series: The introduction of The Commonwealth—a group and network of communities that the combined Alexandria Safe-Zone residents eventually join which only creates additional tensions. It was first introduced in "Volume 29", "Issue #173" of Robert Kirkman's original comic book series. She is also accompanying Eugene's expedition to a distant community.

For the episode "The Tower", the critical consensus on Rotten Tomatoes reads: "Though its myriad of lingering questions will no doubt frustrate fans, the introduction of the outrageously entertaining Princess breathes new life into TWD as 'The Tower' finds the series switching gears to great effect." Dustin Rowles of Uproxx praised Princess' character development and wrote: "Princess (who hasn't seen anyone in over a year) is a little off-kilter... but she is good people and will make a great addition to The Walking Dead cast. I love her." Writing for TV Fanatic, Paul Dailly praised Paola Lázaro's performance as Princess and wrote: "Princess is a complicated personality, but the show has been on such a dark run that the comedic aspects she will bring to the show will only help switch things up." Alyse Wax of Syfy Wire also expressed praise for Lázaro's performance and wrote: "So... I think I love Princess... She is sassy and spunky and I am glad she is joining the cast." Writing for We Live Entertainment, Aaron Neuwirth also commended Lázaro's performance and wrote: "Paola Lazaro does well in bringing the Princess character to life." Matt Fowler of IGN applauded Lázaro's performance, writing: "Princess shined in her introduction, giving the world of the show a sunnier (yet still damaged) character to showcase". Erik Kain of Forbes praised Lázaro's performance, writing: "I love the wackiness of Princess".

Writing for The A.V. Club, Alex McLevy praised the character development of Princess in the episode "Splinter", and gave the episode a B, and wrote: "For all intents and purposes, it's essentially a one-woman show, too. Sure, there's a couple other characters here, but this is the Princess show -- and it's a good one."
