= Splinter (The Walking Dead) =

- The Walking Dead episode
- Episode no.: Season 10; Episode 20
- Directed by: Laura Belsey
- Written by: Julia Ruchman; Vivian Tse
- Cinematography by: Scott Kevan
- Editing by: Tiffany Melvin
- Original air dates: March 19, 2021 (AMC+); March 21, 2021 (AMC)
- Running time: 39 minutes

Guest appearances
- Paola Lázaro as Juanita "Princess" Sanchez; Jessejames Locorriere as Interrogation Trooper; Cameron Roberts as Tyler Davis; Erik Bello as Examining Trooper

Episode chronology
← Previous "One More"	Next → "Diverged"
- The Walking Dead season 10

"Splinter" is the twentieth episode of the tenth season of the post-apocalyptic horror television series The Walking Dead. The 151st episode overall, the episode was directed by Laura Belsey, and written by Julia Ruchman and Vivian Tse. "Splinter" was released on the streaming platform AMC+ on March 19, 2021, and aired on television on AMC two days later, on March 21, 2021.

In the episode, Eugene (Josh McDermitt), Ezekiel (Khary Payton), Yumiko (Eleanor Matsuura), and Princess (Paola Lázaro) are captured and separated by the mysterious troopers that surrounded them at the rail yard in "A Certain Doom". Trapped inside a boxcar and claustrophobic with mounting anxiety, Princess struggles with memories of her traumatic past and attempts to escape.

The episode received generally mixed reviews from critics.

== Plot ==
Eugene, Ezekiel, Yumiko, and Princess are surrounded by several armored soldiers. As she struggles against her captors, Princess watches as Yumiko is hit hard on the head by a soldier with a rifle; the group is separated from each other and imprisoned in boxcars. While in captivity, Princess tries to break the wooden walls separating her and Yumiko, but gets a splinter in her finger, triggering her PTSD. To keep Yumiko awake, Princess tells her about her childhood traumas, while realizing Yumiko is suffering from head trauma, just before soldiers arrive and take Yumiko away.

The next day, Princess discovers an exit to Eugene's boxcar, but he dismisses her and tells her to return to her boxcar so they can appear worthy of the community's time by following their orders; Princess obeys. Later, a soldier summons her to come with him. Once she is checked for bite marks by an examining trooper (Erik Bello), Princess is brought into another room to be interrogated by another trooper (Jessejames Locorriere) about her group. However, Princess refuses to cooperate, aggressively demanding to see Yumiko; the soldier slaps her and knocks her to the ground. Princess later wakes up in her boxcar and sneaks out to see Eugene again, only to find that he is gone; she returns to her boxcar and panics. Suddenly, Ezekiel opens the hatch in the roof and jumps down; the two argue over what to do next.

Soon afterward, a soldier (Cameron Roberts) enters the boxcar with a tray of food, but is ambushed by Ezekiel, who is able to knock the troop unconscious and then handcuffs him. Princess interrogates the soldier with Ezekiel eventually attacking and beating him, before Princess realizes that she was hallucinating Ezekiel the entire time, and she is beating the still fettered soldier. She then escapes from her boxcar and is faced with another hallucination of Ezekiel, who tries to convince her to flee and leave the others behind; she refuses and returns to her boxcar. There, Princess frees the beaten soldier and answers his questions in exchange for seeing her friends; the soldier thanks her and knocks on the door and yells to his squad outside. Immediately, the door slides open, revealing Eugene, Ezekiel, and Yumiko lined up outside with hoods on their heads, guarded by soldiers; a hood is thrown over Princess' head.

== Production ==
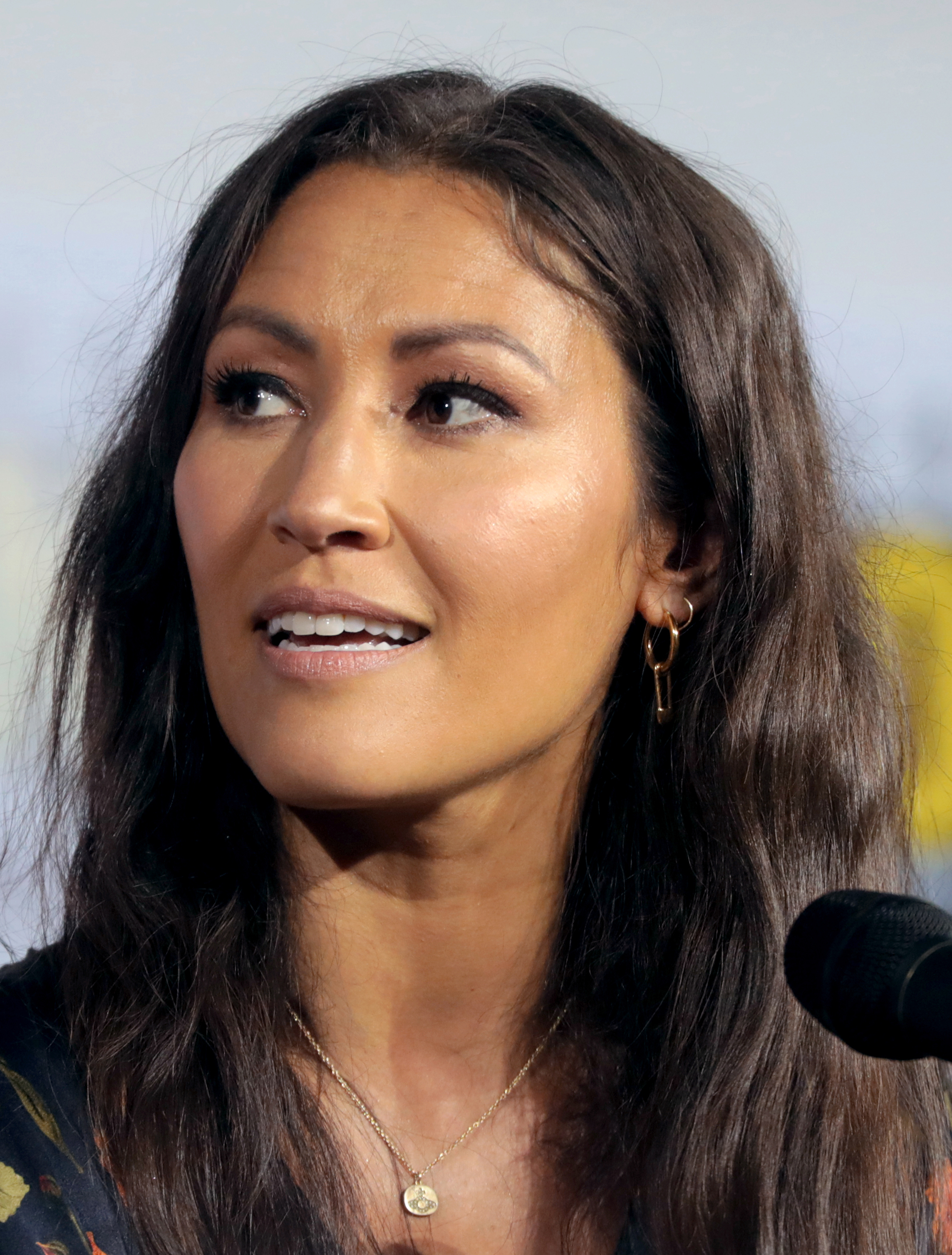
Eleanor Matsuura was absent in the episode due to COVID-19 safety concerns; only her voice is used for this episode.

Eleanor Matsuura, who portrays Yumiko, was not present for the filming of the episode since she was unable to travel, so a body double (Courtney Chen) was used for the physical scenes Yumiko is in. Instead of showing Yumiko, the episode only featured Matsuura's voice, recorded remotely. The showrunner Angela Kang explained: "During production, it was agreed that they shouldn't fly in actors based in European countries due to safety concerns related to the coronavirus pandemic."

During an interview with Dalton Ross of Entertainment Weekly, Kang responded to Matsuura's absence, saying: "So the decision was made to leave Eleanor [Matsuura] and Nadia [Hilker], who hail from the UK and Germany [and play Yumiko and Magna], at home until we could get a little more of a handle on what was going on, which sucks because we love Eleanor, and she desperately wanted to come back to work. But we made a decision for safety reasons. It wouldn't have made sense to not have her in the episodes and it didn't make sense to not deal with that grouping at all. We felt like we wanted to touch on them, but how do you do that and just leave a member of the foursome out of the episode other than via voice and the effect shots?"

== Reception ==
=== Critical reception ===
"Splinter" received mixed reviews. On Rotten Tomatoes, the episode has an approval rating of 64% with an average score of 6.60 out of 10, based on 11 reviews. The site's critical consensus reads: "'Splinter' doesn't move this season's story forward in any meaningful way, but Paola Lázaro's performance and some hallucinatory flourishes keep this character-focused installment from being wholly redundant."

Writing for The A.V. Club, Alex McLevy praised the character development of Princess and gave the episode a B, and wrote: "For all intents and purposes, it's essentially a one-woman show, too. Sure, there's a couple other characters here, but this is the Princess show -- and it's a good one." Ron Hogan of Den of Geek gave the episode 4 out of 5 stars, praising the episode, writing: "Despite being 10 seasons old, there's still a little bit of life in The Walking Dead."

In his review, Erik Kain of Forbes praised Paola Lázaro's performance, writing: "Paula Lázaro is phenomenal in the role, wobbling deftly between comic relief and tragedy. Clearly on the brink but no less likable for it." Nick Romano from Entertainment Weekly gave a negative review and wrote: "We already knew she was in great need of psychotherapy and anxiety meds, but did we need an entire hour focusing on her unraveling mental state? Probably not."

=== Ratings ===
The episode was seen by 2.11 million viewers in the United States on its original air date, below the previous episode.
