= Here's Negan =

- The Walking Dead episode
- Episode no.: Season 10; Episode 22
- Directed by: Laura Belsey
- Written by: David Leslie Johnson-McGoldrick
- Cinematography by: Scott Kevan
- Editing by: Alan Cody
- Original air dates: April 2, 2021 (AMC+); April 4, 2021 (AMC)
- Running time: 49 minutes

Guest appearances
- Hilarie Burton as Lucille; Miles Mussenden as Franklin; Rodney Rowland as Craven; Lindsley Register as Laura; Mandi Christine Kerr as Barbara; Kien Michael Spiller as Hershel Rhee

Episode chronology
← Previous "Diverged"	Next → "Acheron: Part I"
- The Walking Dead season 10

"Here's Negan" is the twenty-second and final episode of the tenth season of the post-apocalyptic horror television series The Walking Dead. The 153rd episode overall, the episode was directed by Laura Belsey and written by David Leslie Johnson-McGoldrick. "Here's Negan" was released on the streaming platform AMC+ on April 2, 2021, and aired on television on AMC two days later, on April 4, 2021.

With Maggie Greene (Lauren Cohan) back at Alexandria, Carol Peletier (Melissa McBride) takes Negan (Jeffrey Dean Morgan) on a journey to minimize the increasing tension. There, Negan reflects on his late wife Lucille (Hilarie Burton-Morgan) and the events that led him to this point. In a major divergence from the source comic of the same name, "Here's Negan" ends with Negan returning to Alexandria to live full time rather than taking off on his own. The episode received acclaim from critics.

== Plot ==
Maggie is walking with her son Hershel in Alexandria when she meets Negan, sharing a tense stare with him. Carol observes this, and shortly after takes Negan to Leah's cabin, claiming the Alexandrian council voted to banish Negan so that he could live away from Maggie. Negan suspects this is Carol's doing and not the councils'. At night, Negan has hallucinations of his old antagonistic self and begins to debate himself. The next day, Negan returns to where he was defeated by Rick Grimes at the end of the Savior War, recalling how Michonne told him that his baseball bat "Lucille" was never recovered afterwards. Negan searches and digs up his long-lost bat as a walker approaches and he reflects on his past.

Twelve years earlier, Negan encounters doctor Franklin (Miles Mussenden) and his adoptive daughter Laura, who eventually becomes a prominent savior. They give him his needed medicine, as well as Laura's baseball bat for defense. In unseen events Negan is captured and beaten by motorcycle gang Valak's Vipers, led by Craven (Rodney Rowland), who taunts Negan about his wife Lucille.

Six weeks earlier, after society has fallen to the walkers, Negan treats his wife Lucille with scavenged medicine, attempting to follow a schedule provided from her doctor. After a walker is attracted by the noise of their generator, Negan turns it off, hoping that the walker will lose interest and leave; however Negan falls asleep without turning it back on, spoiling Lucille's medicine which is stored in a fridge. Devastated, he vows to find more medicine, but Lucille reveals she learned of an affair he had before the apocalypse, and knows that he is trying to make up for it; she insists that he has already made amends, and asks her to be with him as her inevitable death approaches. Negan refuses and leaves, unwilling to let her die and determined to make up for the past.

Seven months earlier, at the apocalypse's onset, Negan is a deadbeat husband to Lucille (Hilarie Burton-Morgan). Having lost his job as a high school gym teacher he spends his time playing video games. He recklessly spends money on items, including what would soon be his signature leather jacket, and has been having an affair with Lucille's friend Janine. At some point shortly before the apocalypse, Lucille is diagnosed with cancer and discovers Negan's affair, though she chooses not to tell him that she knows about the latter.

Negan's reflection on the past culminates with his reluctant betrayal of Franklin's location, and upon capturing Franklin and Laura the gang lets Negan go with the medicine. He returns to Lucille to find she has killed herself. A devastated Negan dons the leather jacket, burns their house down, and wraps the baseball bat in barbed wire. He returns to the bar Craven is based out of and kills most of Valak's Vipers, helping Franklin and Laura go free; Negan then uses the bat, which he names "Lucille", to kill a subdued Craven.

In the present, the walker tries to attack Negan, but he kills it with Lucille. The blow combined with the bat's brittle condition after being buried and exposed to the elements for years causes Lucille to splinter and break beyond repair. That night, Negan memorializes his wife and apologizes to her for everything before burning the bat. At peace with his past, Negan returns to Alexandria, where Carol warns him that Maggie will likely try to kill him if he stays. She admits taking him to the cabin so his death would not be on her conscience – but now that he has returned, she will feel no guilt if he does die. Negan accepts whatever fate befalls him, and walks back into Alexandria, answering Maggie's hateful stare with a smile.

== Production and development ==
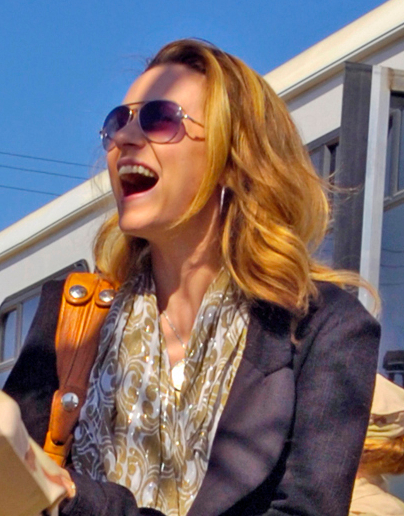
Hilarie Burton-Morgan made a guest appearance in the episode as Lucille. Burton is the real-life wife of Jeffrey Dean Morgan.

This episode features Hilarie Burton-Morgan (real-life wife of Jeffrey Dean Morgan) as Lucille, Negan's late wife. Her casting was first announced on November 3, 2020. The episode also guest stars Rodney Rowland and Miles Mussenden, whose casting were announced on January 6, 2021. The episode also brings back Lindsley Register as Laura who appears in Negan's flashbacks. Laura died in the episode "Stalker" and also appeared in one of Michonne's hallucinations in "What We Become".

Dalton Ross of Entertainment Weekly, interviewed Burton and was very comfortable with her character as Lucille and said: "It was definitely already on the page. What was great about Lucille is that, a lot of times when characters, particularly women, get diagnosed with cancer, all of a sudden they're written as these ethereal, angelic creatures."

I appreciate that. You sent me a text saying it was the first time you've been moved to tears on the show in 11 seasons, so I was happy.

— Jeffrey Dean Morgan

During an interview with Brandon Davis of Comicbook.com, Burton expressed gratitude for working together with her husband Jeffrey Dean Morgan and said: "I'm really lucky in my career that I don't really audition for work. I work with my friends and so I do that intentionally because I like having a short hand with the people that I'm working with. And so you'll see me work a lot with old co-stars from One Tree Hill, or White Collar, or other jobs that I've done. But to work with my spouse, like the person that I go to sleep with, and brush my teeth with, and cook with, and do all the things with, that took it to a whole other level. And if anything, I really had difficulty restraining myself and getting emotional because Lucille is supposed to be this bad-ass, like she's the tough one. She's the rock and Negan is the emotional one."

The song "Back in Black" by AC/DC is used in the scene where Negan is playing video games. Also used is the song "You Are So Beautiful" by Joe Cocker, which is described by Negan in the episode as "probably the greatest love ballad ever written" and is Lucille's favorite song.

== Reception ==
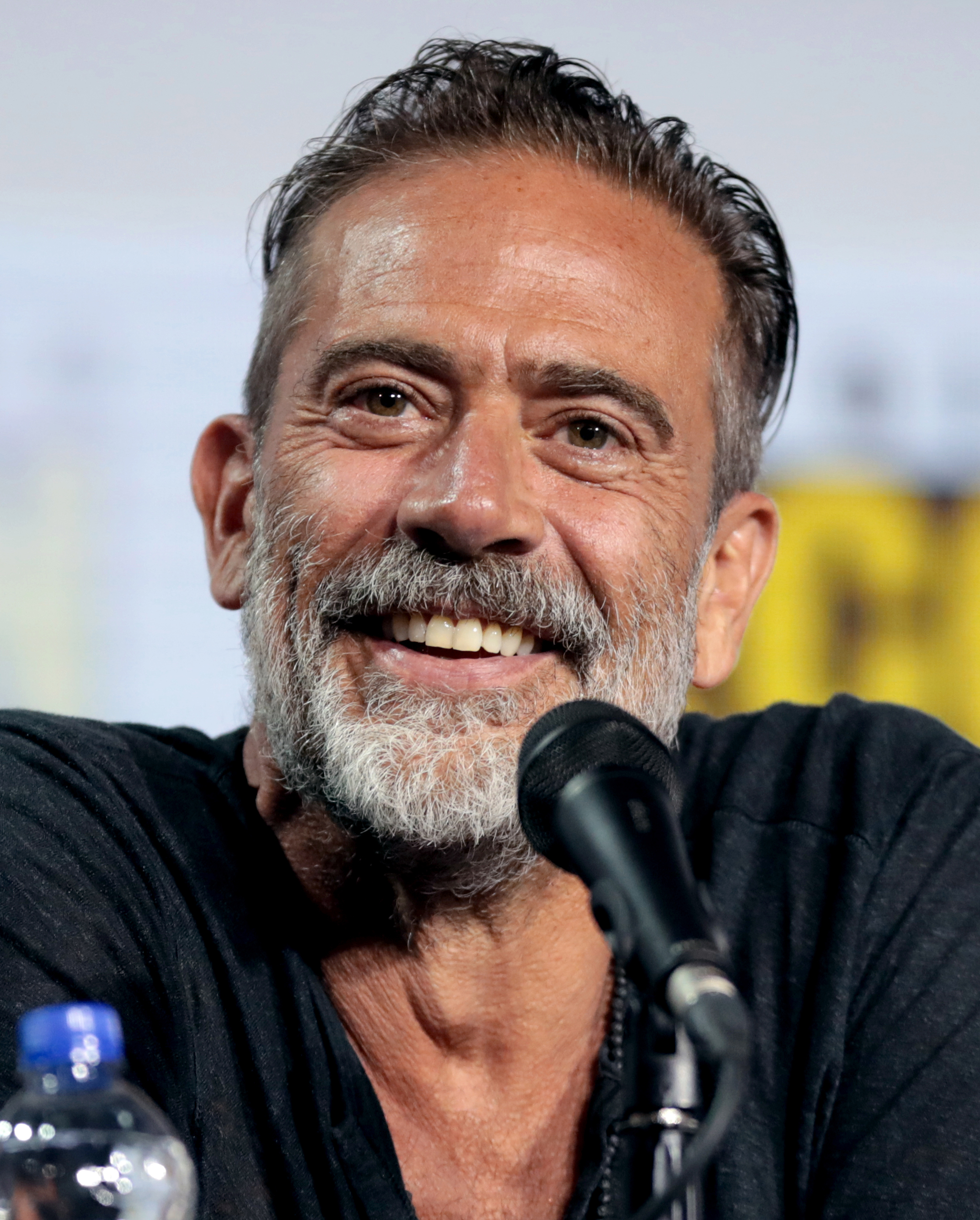
The episode prominently features Jeffrey Dean Morgan as Negan; his performance was critically acclaimed.

"The Walking Dead season 10, episode 22 seemed like the perfect place to explore Negan’s tortured backstory. And it was, while also teeing up an obvious conflict between him and Maggie for whenever the show returns for its swansong.

— Jonathon Wilson

=== Critical reception ===
"Here's Negan" received widespread critical acclaim, with many hailing it as one of the best episodes of the series. On Rotten Tomatoes, the episode has an approval rating of 86% with an average score of 9 out of 10, based on 14 reviews. The site's critical consensus reads: "Jeffrey Dean Morgan's chemistry with real-life partner Hilarie Burton adds a bittersweet authenticity to "Here's Negan," a strong season finale that brings shades of humanity to one of The Walking Dead's most irredeemable characters."

Ron Hogan of Den of Geek gave the episode a 5/5 rating, praising Morgan's performance, and wrote: "With "Here's Negan," Jeffrey Dean Morgan was given a major opportunity to show off his acting chops, and he absolutely shines". Jeffrey Lyles of Lyles' Movie Files gave it a 10/10 rating and wrote: "Here's Negan provided some stellar context for The Walking Dead's best villain. And in the process provided one of the best, most emotional episodes in the entire series." Zach Marsh of FilmSpeak gave the episode an "A+" - the highest possible grade on the site - calling it the series' best episode and adding that it "belongs on the same kind of “best episodes of the decade” lists that the likes of “Ozymandias” or “The Suitcase”...seemed to dominate," also opining that Morgan's performance was worthy of an Emmy nomination.

Alex McLevy writing for The A.V. Club praised the episode with a qualification of B+ and in his review he said: ""Here's Negan" makes sense as the final installment of these bonus season 10 episodes, not only because it's the best of the bunch, but because it effectively bookends the first, Maggie-centric episode, bringing their histories full circle." Erik Kain in his Forbes gave a review positive, said: "This was truly one of the best episodes of The Walking Dead in years. One of the best since the early seasons certainly, and the best of these six bonus episodes without a doubt."

Matt Fowler for IGN gave it a 8/10 wrote that the episode "Lucille is no longer an idea, as Burton gives us a full and vibrant character who can see the good person tucked away inside a bratty, selfish sneak." Paul Dailly of TV Fanatic gave the episode 5 out of 5 and praised the performances of Morgan and Burton, during his review he wrote: "I think it's fair to say that Jeffrey Dean Morgan and Hilarie Burton Morgan deserve all the awards for their work on "Here's Negan.""

Writing for io9, Rob Bricken gave a negative review, and said: "The episode decides to use multiple flashbacks within flashbacks, which are so wildly uneven that they're much more awkward than compelling."

=== Ratings ===
The episode was seen by 2.12 million viewers in the United States on its original air date, above the previous episodes.
