= Diverged (The Walking Dead) =

- The Walking Dead episode
- Episode no.: Season 10; Episode 21
- Directed by: David Boyd
- Written by: Heather Bellson
- Cinematography by: Duane Charles Manwiller
- Editing by: Jack Colwell
- Original air dates: March 26, 2021 (AMC+); March 28, 2021 (AMC)
- Running time: 41 minutes

Episode chronology
← Previous "Splinter"	Next → "Here's Negan"
- The Walking Dead season 10

"Diverged" is the twenty-first and penultimate episode of the tenth season of the post-apocalyptic horror television series The Walking Dead. The 152nd episode overall, the episode was directed by David Boyd and written by Heather Bellson. "Diverged" was released on the streaming platform AMC+ on March 26, 2021, and aired on television on AMC two days later, on March 28, 2021.

The episode focuses on the concurrent, individual struggles of Daryl (Norman Reedus) and Carol (Melissa McBride). After a low point in their friendship, the two come to a fork in the road and head their separate ways. Each going into their own type of survival mode, they spend the day running into their own set of obstacles, which they must overcome in their own ways.

The episode received generally negative reviews from critics, with many considering it the worst episode of the series.

== Plot ==
On the road, Daryl, Carol, and Dog are on their way back to Alexandria. Carol struggles to open her canteen, so Daryl gives her his pocketknife to loosen the cap. Daryl decides to stay out in the woods a little longer in an effort to find more supplies for the damaged community. The two eventually come to a fork in the road and separate; Dog decides to follow Carol, upsetting Daryl.

Afterward, Carol returns to Alexandria where the solar panels are still damaged. She approaches Jerry and asks him what she can do to help. Jerry doesn't have any jobs for her, but can tell something is bothering her. Carol leaves and decides to make food for everyone, but a rat is in her house that has Dog riled up. Unable to cook anything because of the solar panel wreckage, Carol leaves Alexandria to search for soup ingredients. She is surrounded by walkers in a field, but manages to kill them all.

In the woods, after Daryl's motorcycle breaks down and continuing on foot, he finds a group of abandoned cars and parts he needs to fix his motorcycle. He is unable to make the repairs without his pocketknife, and then decides to walk his motorcycle back to Alexandria. He comes upon a group of walkers dressed in military outfits, kills them, and finds a knife to help with his repairs.

Meanwhile, back in Alexandria, Carol fixes the solar panels and begins to cook her soup, but ends up chasing the rat through the kitchen before the solar panels fizzle out. She goes to bed with Dog, saying she misses Daryl and knows he'll be back soon, but she contemplates leaving. In the middle of the night, Carol and Dog hear the rat, leading Carol to have a breakdown and destroy part of the kitchen wall. The next morning, Carol cleans the kitchen and cooks her soup. Jerry arrives, who asks if she is doing okay; he admits he is worried about Ezekiel. As they share a hug, the rat exits the house and runs off, much to Carol's relief. Outside, Daryl returns on his repaired motorcycle and encounters Carol. Tired, Daryl declines Carol's offer for soup; the two again go their separate ways.

== Reception ==
=== Critical reception ===
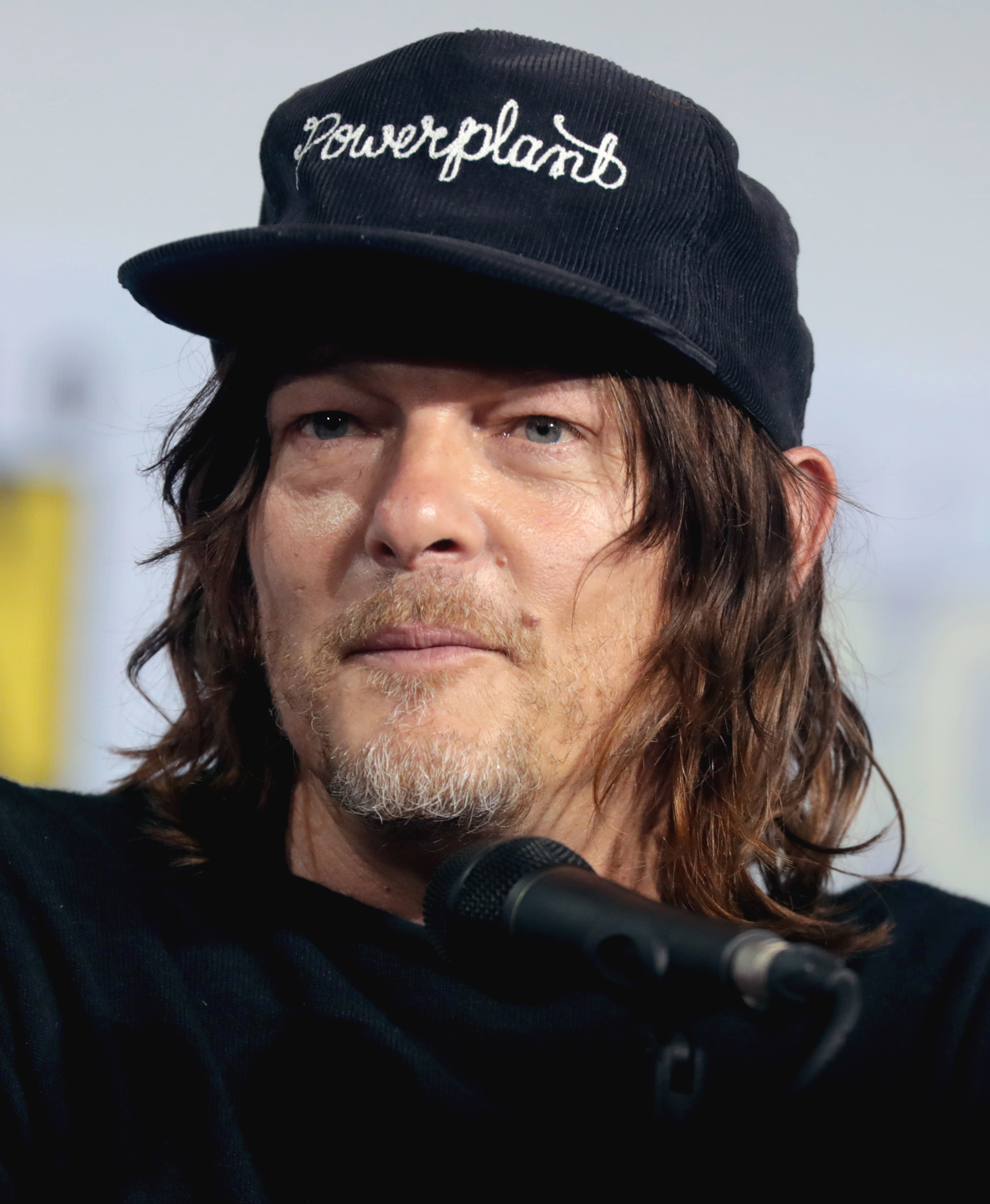
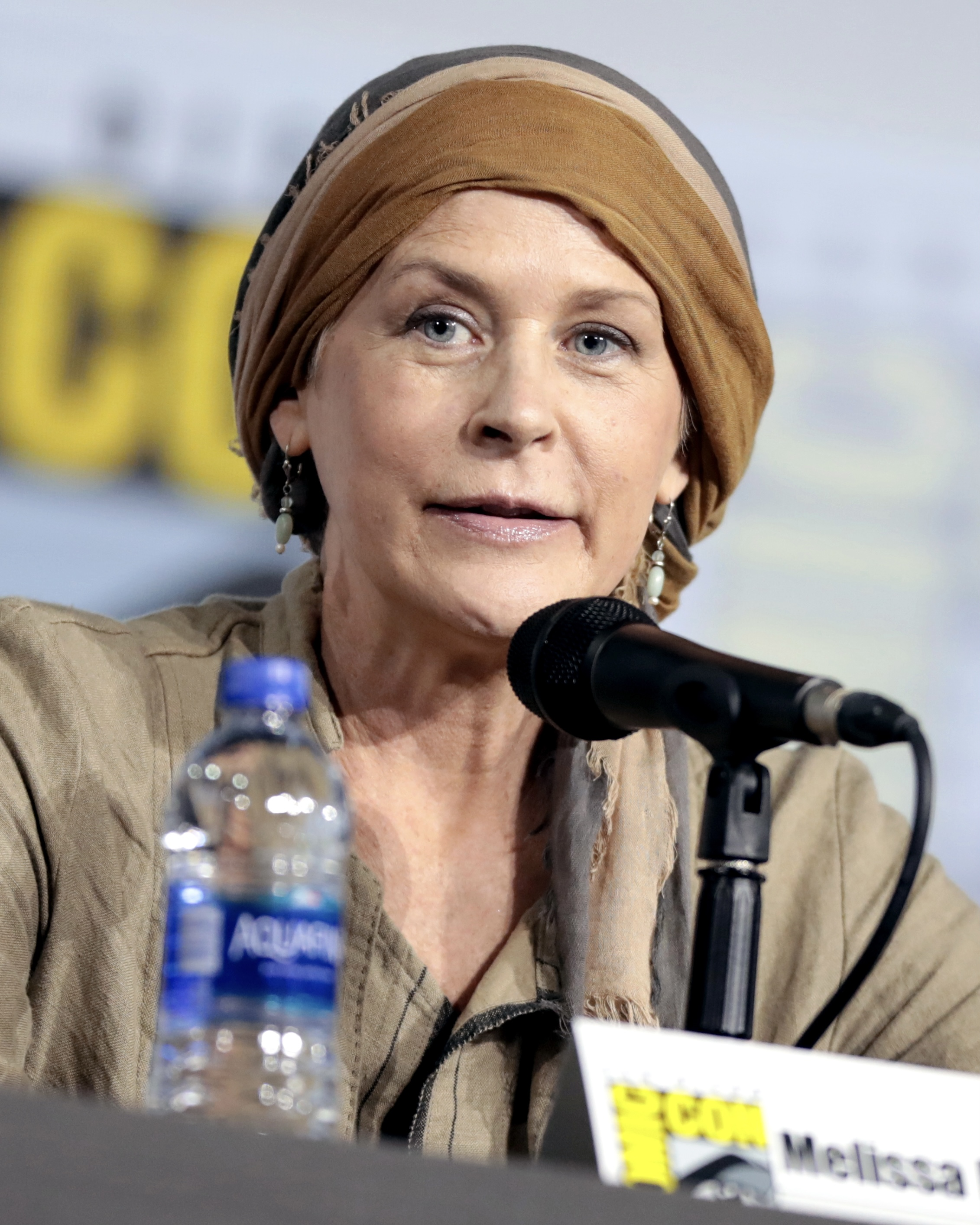
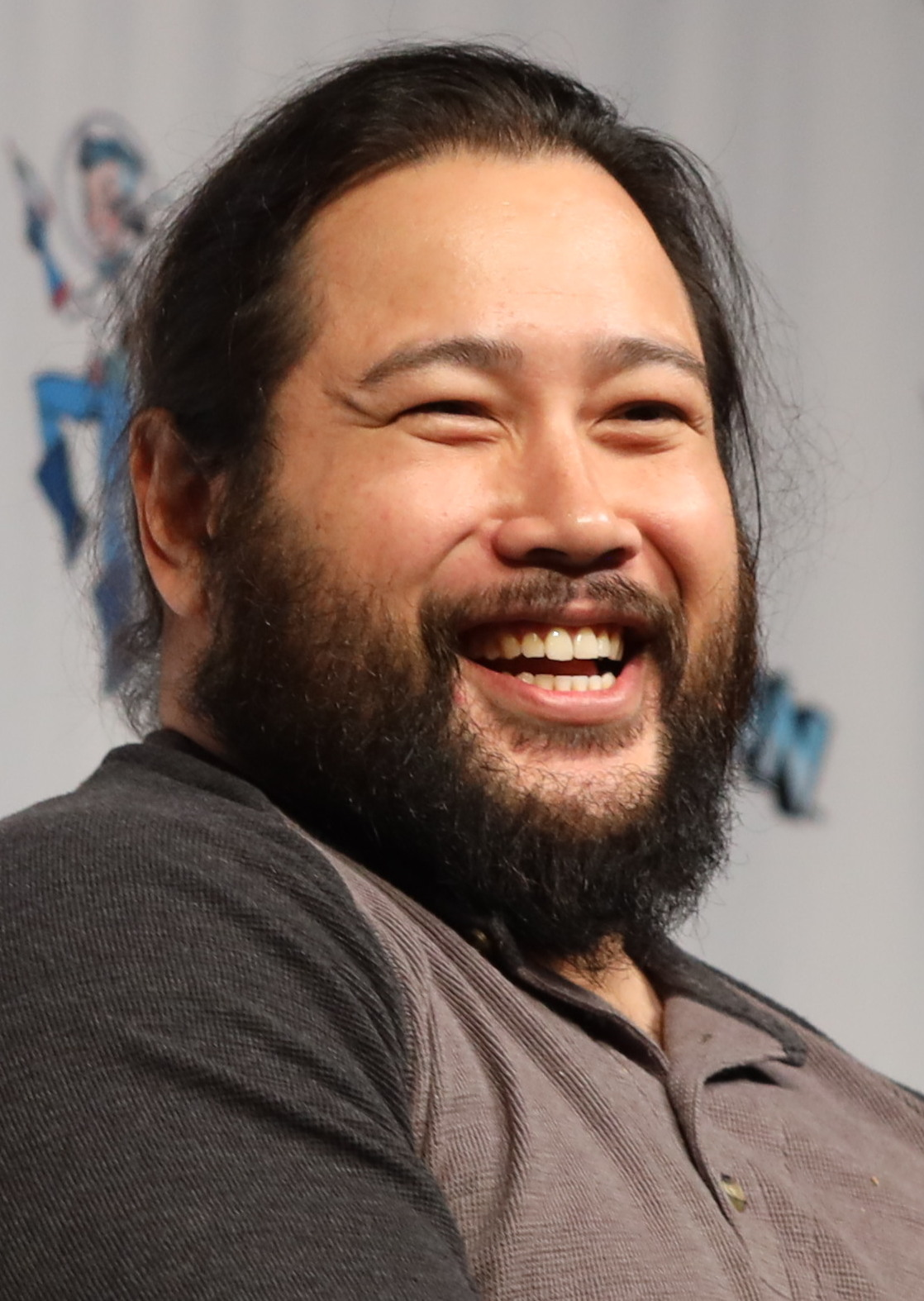
Norman Reedus (Daryl), Melissa McBride (Carol), and Cooper Andrews (Jerry) were the only regular actors to appear in the episode. Despite negative reviews for the episode itself, McBride was praised for her performance.

"Diverged" received predominantly negative reviews from critics, with many claiming it as the worst episode of the series, while the response from audiences being more polarized. On Rotten Tomatoes, the episode has an approval rating of 36% with an average score of 4.60 out of 10, based on 14 reviews. The site's critical consensus reads: "'Diverged' focuses on fan-favorites Carol and Daryl, but this wheel-spinning installment adds very few fresh layers to these already well-established characters." It is also the second worst reviewed episode on the website, tying with "The King, the Widow, and Rick" (season 8, episode 6), which has an average score of 5.80 out of 10, based on 28 reviews.

Alex McLevy of The A.V. Club gave the episode a "C−", writing: "When people talk about The Walking Dead like it's running on fumes, this is the kind of episode to which they're referring." Writing for io9, Rob Bricken also gave a negative review and wrote: "Honestly, this episode didn't need to exist. It was extremely slow, even compared to the other season 10/pandemic episodes, and it quickly wraps up something that we already knew would have been wrapped sooner or later." Nick Romano of Entertainment Weekly criticized the episode, writing: "It just seems inconsequential... except for fueling this dream for Carol's Food Network debut." In her review for Insider, Kirsten Acuna also gave a negative review and wrote: "On the surface, 'Diverged' is a bit of a slog and a completely unnecessary bottle episode."

Forbes reviewer Erik Kain panned the episode, writing: "Not only is 'Diverged' the worst of the bonus Season 10 episodes so far, it's basically the worst episode since Angela Kang took over as showrunner." In contrast, Paul Dailly of TV Fanatic gave the episode a positive review and 4 out of 5 stars, writing: "It will be one of those polarizing hours because it was another deep dive into characters who have been a part of the series since the beginning. For that reason alone, 'Diverged' was one of my favorite episodes in a long time." In his review for Den of Geek, Ron Hogan also gave a positive review and 4 out of 5 stars, praising the character development of Carol and Melissa McBride's performance, and wrote: "Melissa McBride is nothing if not charismatic as this character, and viewers will be invested in watching Carol look more like the Carol who ingratiated herself to Alexandria with molasses cookies rather than the depressed shell she has been, or the remorseless killing machine she's been in the past. Carol is still struggling with her place in the world, but it's a more relatable sort of struggle (especially for those of us who live in old buildings)."

=== Ratings ===
The episode was seen by 1.94 million viewers in the United States on its original air date, below the previous episode.
