= Laura Belsey =

American television director

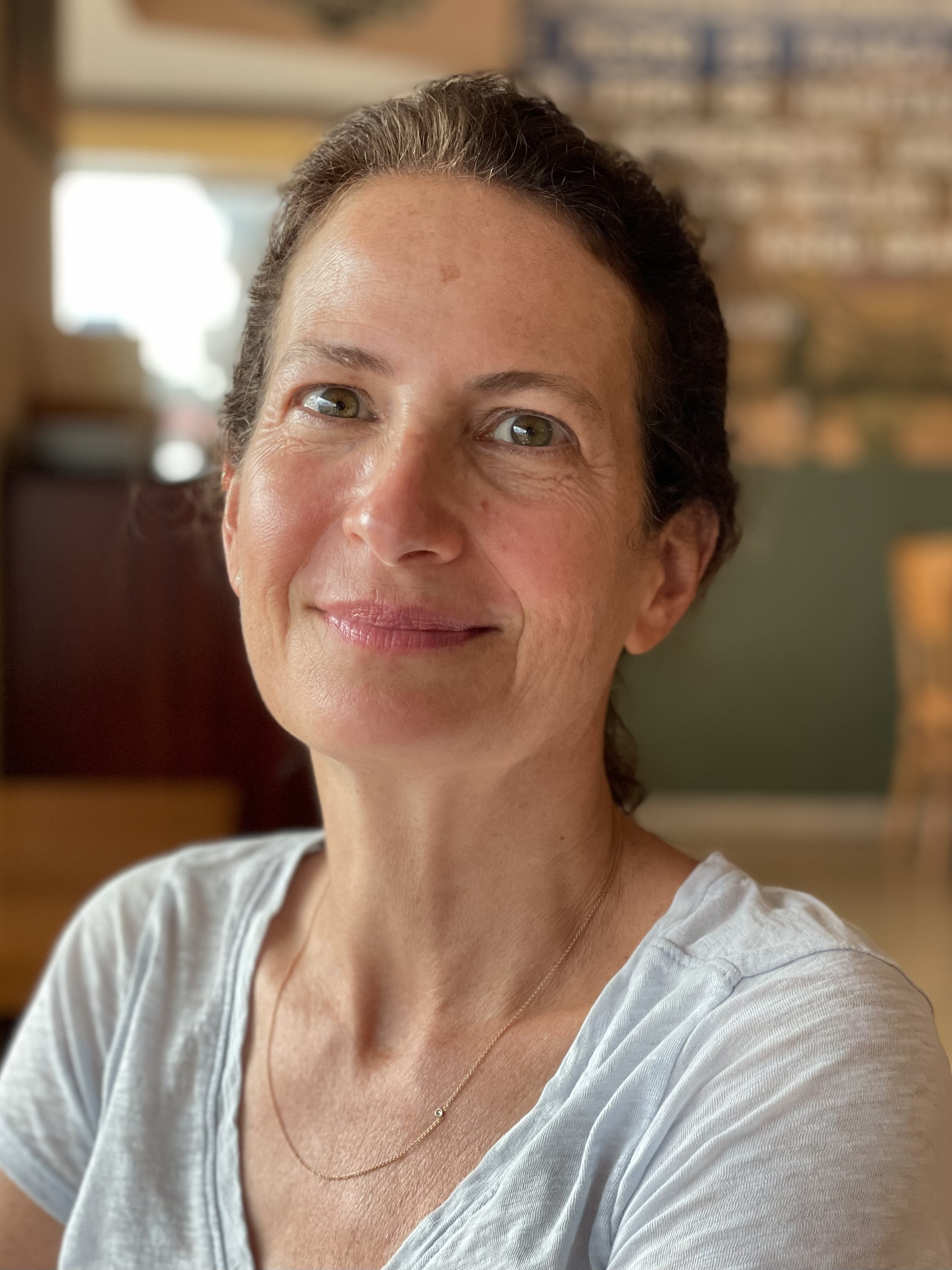
- Born: New Orleans, Louisiana, U.S.
- Occupation: Television director

Laura Belsey is an American television director. She is best known for directing The Walking Dead, Shadow and Bone, and Dr. Death.

== Life and career ==
Laura was born in New Orleans and raised in Switzerland. She began directing commercials after graduating from NYU's Tisch School of the Arts. She won a Gold Lion from the Cannes Lions International Festival of Creativity.

Belsey's work in television has received numerous critical accolades. Forbes wrote that "The Calm Before", one of the episodes she directed of The Walking Dead, "might actually be the best episode in series history." Paste wrote that "Belsey demonstrates an immediate gift for naturalistic exchanges between these characters. From an execution standpoint, this episode was a brilliant breath of fresh air."

Another Belsey-directed The Walking Dead episode, "Here's Negan" is "one of the most brilliant episodes in the show's 10-year history, according to Walking Dead executive producer and former showrunner Scott Gimple." Zach Marsh of FilmSpeak gave the episode an "A+" - the highest possible grade on the site - calling it the series' best episode and adding that it "belongs on the same kind of "best episodes of the decade" lists. Also from FilmSpeak: "Laura Belsey delivers another home run for "The Walking Dead". Her collaboration tonight with Morgan is the kind of director-actor output that we more commonly associate with cinema than with television, but the results are just as powerful."

Den of Geek wrote of Preacher's Les Enfants du Sang, it's "Laura Belsey's direction that pushes the episode toward comedic greatness." The A.V. Club noted that her episode "Human Target" for Arrow "is damn near perfect." while Geeks Worldwide declared that "Human Target is probably among the best directed Arrow episodes to date."

Laura is a member of the Directors Guild of America (DGA). In August 2023, Laura Belsey was elected National Vice President of the Directors Guild of America, a position formerly held by Steven Soderbergh.

== Selected filmography ==
- 2013-2014 – Law & Order: Special Victims Unit (2 episodes)
- 2014-2017 – Criminal Minds (4 episodes)
- 2018 – Genius (2 episodes)
- 2018-2019 – New Amsterdam (2 episodes)
- 2018-2019 – Queen of the South (2 episodes)
- 2018-2019 – Preacher (2 episodes)
- 2016-2019 – Arrow (7 episodes; "Canary Cry", "Human Target", "Honor Thy Fathers", "Tribute", "Irreconcilable Differences" "The Longbow Hunters", "Prochnost")
- 2019 – Animal Kingdom (1 episode)
- 2019 – Batwoman (1 episode; "Crisis on Infinite Earths: Part Two")
- 2019 – Bosch (1 episode)
- 2019-2020 – S.W.A.T. (2 episodes)
- 2019-2021 – The Walking Dead (6 episodes; "The Calm Before", "What It Always Is", "The Tower", "One More", "Splinter", "Here's Negan")
- 2021 – Manifest (1 episode)
- 2021 – The Equalizer (1 episode)
- 2021 – Fantasy Island (2 episodes)
- 2021 – American Horror Story (1 episode)
- 2022 - The Endgame (1 episode)
- 2022 – Moonhaven (2 episodes)
- 2023 - National Treasure: Edge of History (1 episode)
- 2023 - Shadow and Bone (1 episode)
- 2023 - Dr. Death (4 episodes)
- 2024 - Hightown (1 episode)
- 2024 - FBI (2 episodes)
- 2024 - Parish (2 episodes)
