= One More (The Walking Dead) =

- The Walking Dead episode
- Episode no.: Season 10; Episode 19
- Directed by: Laura Belsey
- Written by: Jim Barnes; Erik Mountain
- Cinematography by: Scott Kevan
- Editing by: Maria Gonzales
- Original air dates: March 12, 2021 (AMC+); March 14, 2021 (AMC)
- Running time: 46 minutes

Guest appearance
- Robert Patrick as Mays / Mr. Mays

Episode chronology
| ← Previous "Find Me" | Next → "Splinter" |
- The Walking Dead season 10

"One More" is the nineteenth episode of the tenth season of the post-apocalyptic horror television series The Walking Dead. The 150th episode overall, the episode was directed by Laura Belsey, and written by Jim Barnes and Erik Mountain. "One More" was released on the streaming platform AMC+ on March 12, 2021, and aired on television on AMC two days later, on March 14, 2021.

In the episode, with a map from Maggie, Aaron (Ross Marquand) and Gabriel (Seth Gilliam) search for food and supplies to bring back to Alexandria. Checking out one more location, they chance upon a stash. Faith is broken and optimism is fragmented when they are put to the ultimate test.

The episode was overwhelmingly praised by critics, particularly the performances and Laura Belsey's direction.

== Plot ==
With a map of potential supply sources that Maggie created, Aaron and Gabriel are on a supply run. On their way, the two slay walkers in a field, but are unsuccessful in their search and discuss how much they miss their daughters. Later, Gabriel falls into mud and destroys the map, but still wants to visit the final location, a water tower. Aaron, however, believes it's pointless and wants to return to Alexandria.

Later, the men find a seemingly abandoned warehouse. There, Aaron kills a wild boar that was about to attack him. They then cook and eat the animal, and also find a bottle of whiskey that they drink while playing cards. The next day, Gabriel wakes up and discovers that Aaron has disappeared before an armed man suddenly appears, revealing that he lives in the warehouse. The man tells Gabriel that he is angry at them for killing his boar and drinking his whiskey. Gabriel tries to convince him that they are good people, but he doesn't believe him. The man then retrieves Aaron and forces the two to play Russian roulette, and the two of them ask the man why he is forcing them to do this. and he replies "enlightenment." He gives them the option of pointing the gun at the other player instead of themselves each round, expecting that they will opt to kill the other to spare their own life. Instead, neither of them point the gun at the other. When Aaron calls Gabriel family, the man snaps and says that several years beforehand, his brother stole his food and tried to kill him, forcing him to "handle the situation", presumably killing him. This betrayal from his own brother led the man to believe that all people are selfish and evil, and he is now trying to prove that all mankind is selfish. Eventually they manage to convince the man that not all people are bad, and the man reveals that his name is Mays. Gabriel takes advantage of Mays' lowered guard by smashing his head with the mace attachment on Aaron's prosthetic arm, killing him instantly, feeling that Mays is too dangerous to risk taking home with them. When Gabriel says that they're now all good, Aaron replies "are we?"

Afterwards, Aaron and Gabriel discover a room upstairs stocked with supplies. They find Mays' brother in handcuffs, revealing that Mays had kept him alive as a prisoner for years, with the corpses of his wife and daughter at his feet, bullet holes in their skulls. Gabriel frees the man, who grabs Gabriel's gun and commits suicide by shooting himself. Aaron and Gabriel then gather the Mays' supplies and leave. The two later cross a field and spot the water tower. Aaron says "one more", and they head off toward the water tower.

== Production ==
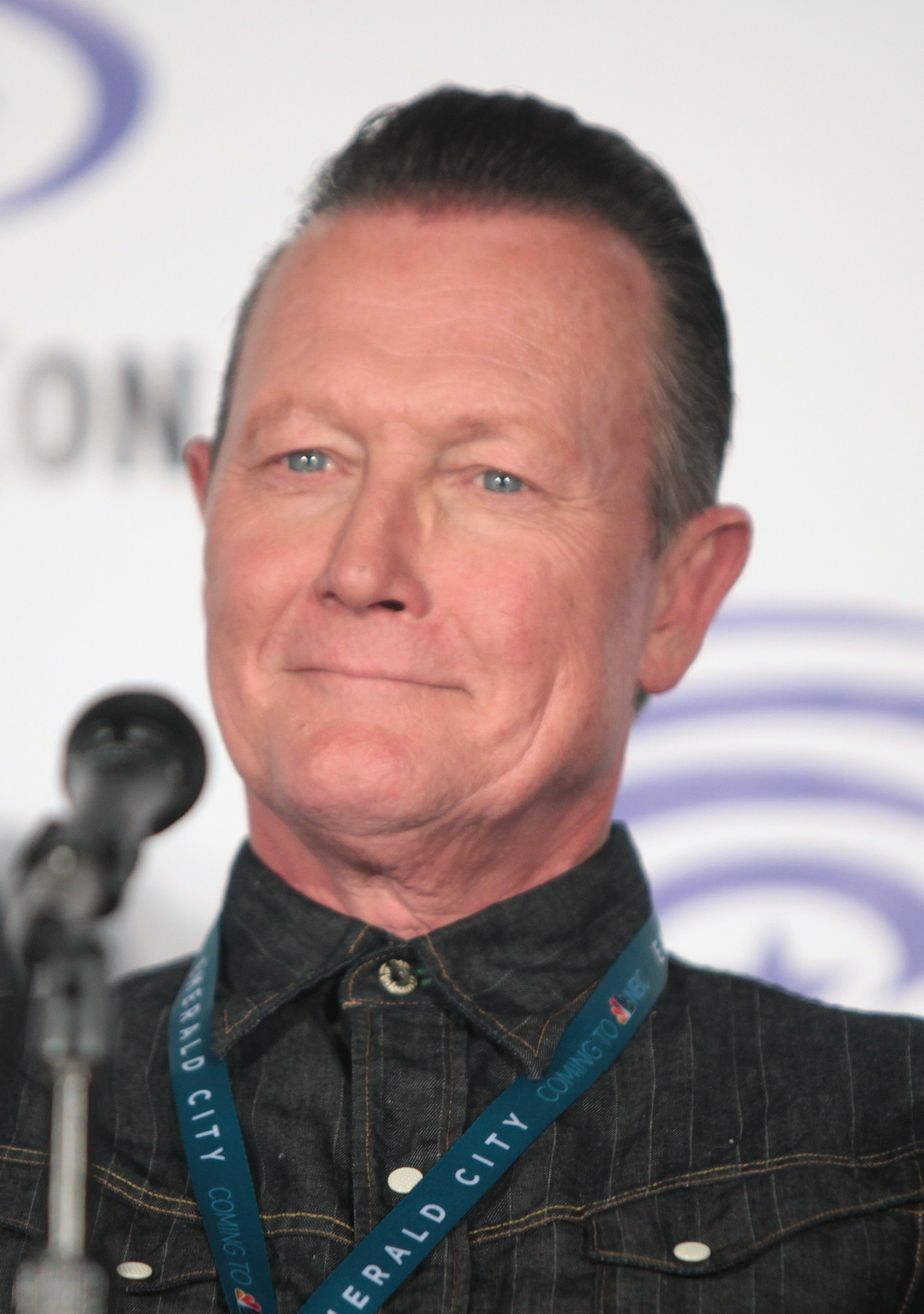
Robert Patrick guest starred in this episode as Mays, a deranged and renegade survivor, who lost trust in people and lives in an apparently abandoned warehouse. Patrick's performance was acclaimed by critics.

This episode features Robert Patrick as Mays; Patrick also portrayed the character's twin brother. His casting was first announced on November 19, 2020.

During an interview with Alex Zalben of Decider, Patrick said:

"I didn't give this terrified, scruffy brother much thought. I really didn't. I did give a lot of thought to the dynamics, the betrayal of brothers, one brother letting down another brother. And I understand it. I had brothers, and I know what that's like, I know that disappointment. The twin aspect sort of heightened that. What that must be like, so I understood that. When we approached the appearance of the guy, he was supposed to be gaunt, obviously didn't get to eat well and had been chained up on that wall for… How many years? We don't know, a long time. But if you judge by the length of his hair, we wanted something really drastic like that. So I really pushed for the long hair. And I approached it from: he was a shelter dog. How dogs that are mistreated by humans, how they react when they get put into a shelter, and they're in a cage, and they're afraid of humans. That was pretty much the only thought I gave the guy… He was hostile, he was scared. He would bite you if he got a chance, which, taking the gun from [Father Gabriel] was that opportunity. What he really wanted to do is just take his own life because it couldn't stand misery anymore."

In an interview with Kirsten Acuna of Insider, Patrick stated that he is a follower of the series and said:

"A bit of all of the above. I've been a fan of the show. I've watched the show. Being filmed in Atlanta, that's my birthplace. The whole concept was very interesting to me. So yes, I was aware of it. Of course, I know Gale Anne Hurd from the "Terminator" franchise, so I was curious what she was doing. Glen Mazzara was one of the writers and showrunners for a while. Scotty Wilson was an old friend of mine. Laurie Holden, I worked with on the 'X-Files,' so thematically I was very curious about it and was a fan."

Xander Berkeley, who portrayed Gregory, also appeared in Terminator 2: Judgment Day (1991). His character was killed by Patrick's character, the T-1000. Berkeley congratulated Patrick by saying: "Congrats buddy! Say hi for me."

== Reception ==
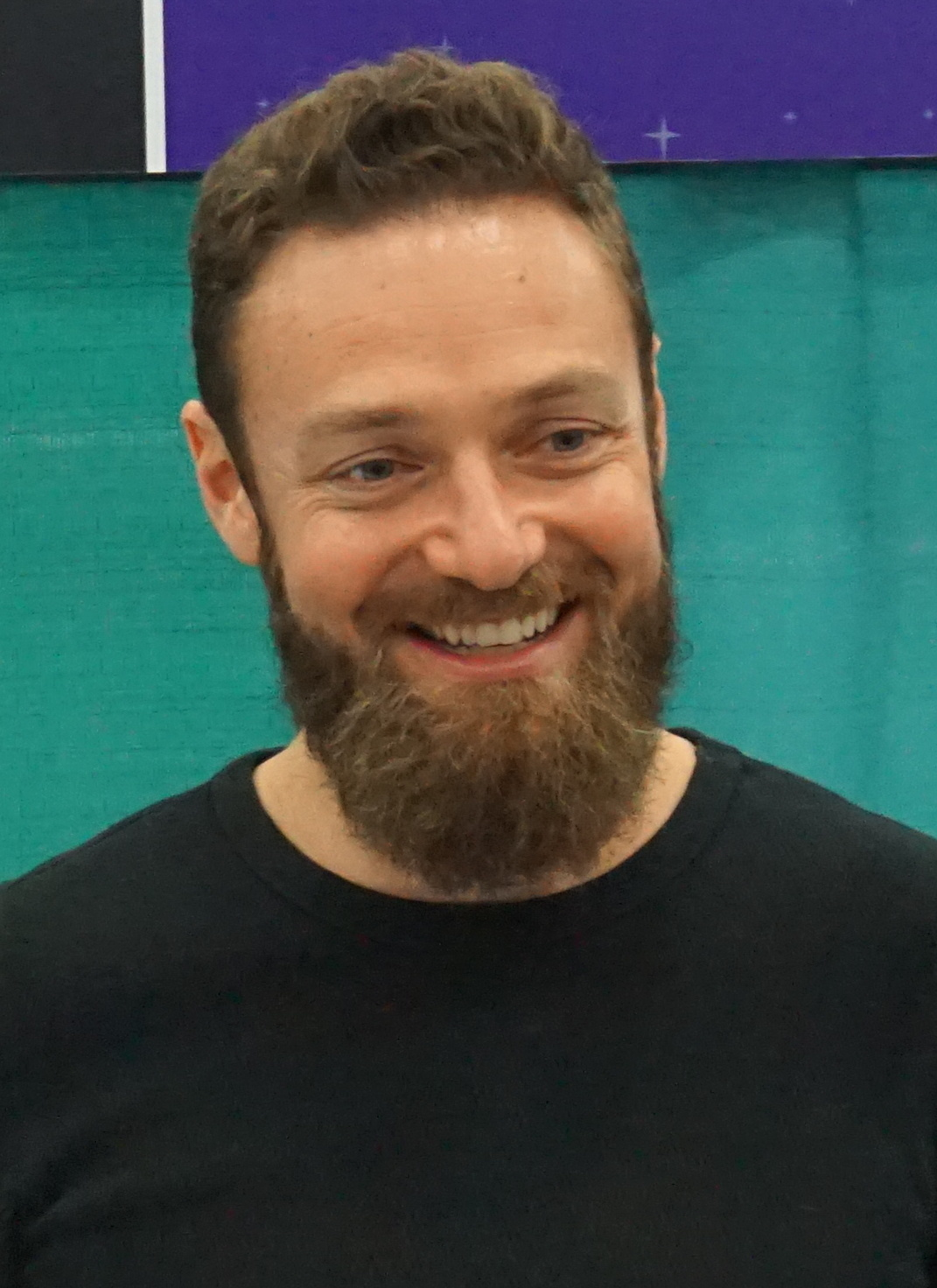
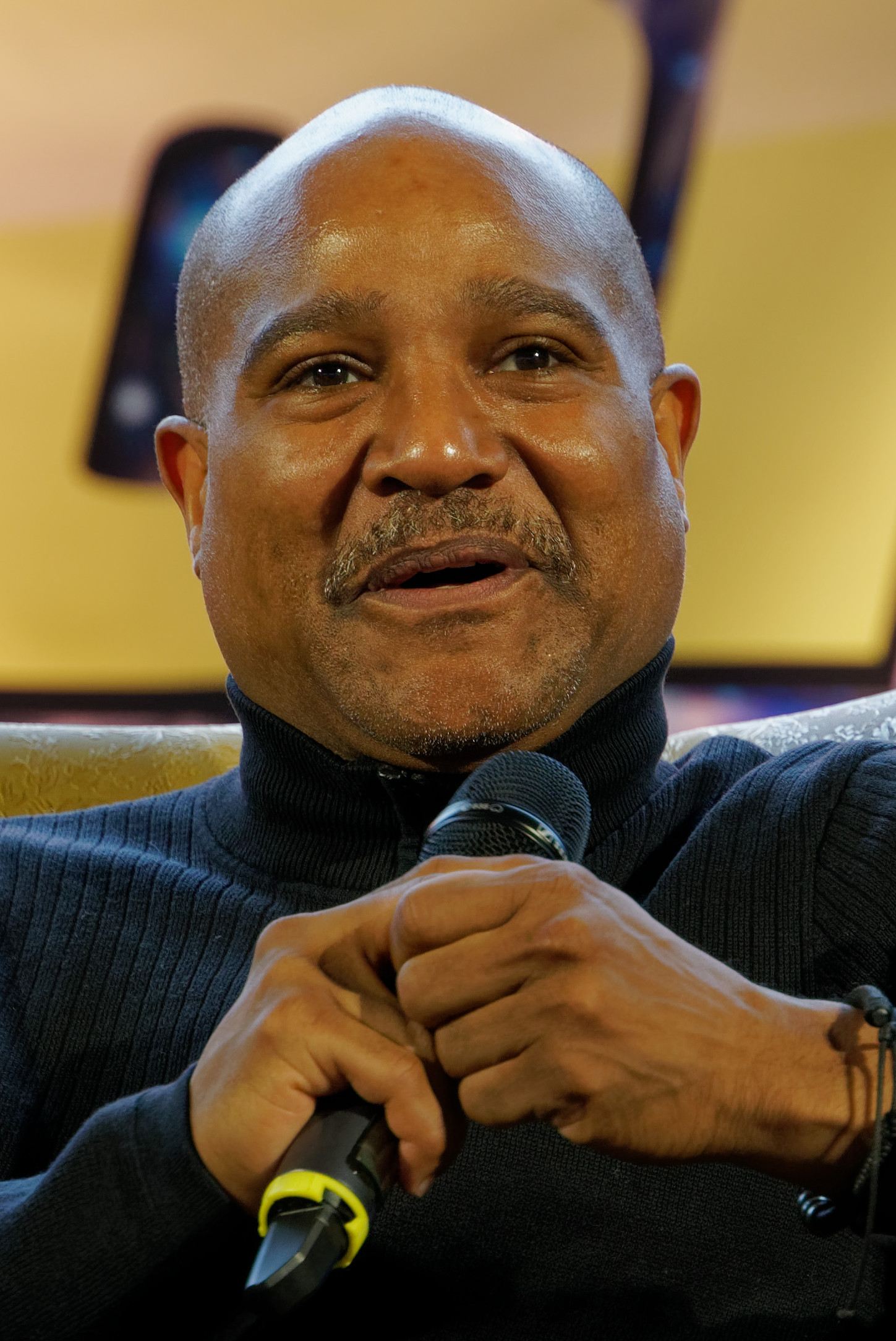
Ross Marquand (left) and Seth Gilliam (right) were the only regular actors to appear in the episode. Their performances were acclaimed by critics.

=== Critical reception ===
"One More" received critical acclaim. On Rotten Tomatoes, the episode has an approval rating of 100% with an average score of 7.80 out of 10, based on 12 reviews. The site's critical consensus reads: "Seth Gilliam and Ross Marquand shine in a self-contained adventure that lulls viewers with some refreshing male bonding before turning the tables with a shocking twist."

Ron Hogan of Den of Geek gave the episode 4.5 out of 5 stars, praising Laura Besley's direction and Robert Patrick's performance, writing: "From the moment Robert Patrick steps into frame, he's an arresting figure to watch." Writing for TV Fanatic, Paul Daily gave the episode 4.25 out of 5 stars, praising the character development of Aaron and Gabriel, and wrote: "Aaron and Gabriel have never been my favorite characters, but "One More" was a perfect way to shed light on some of the finer details of them before throwing them in at the deep end."

Writing for We Live Entertainment, Aaron Neuwirth praised the performances of Marquand and Gilliam, writing: "Ross Marquand and Seth Gilliam get a chance to flex their acting muscles a bit more, as well as have fun with each other... Their adventure is largely about the strength of perseverance, and it works as a solid standalone." Alex McLevy of The A.V. Club also gave a positive review and a "B" grade rating, and wrote: "You're left with the sense that we no longer know what Gabriel will do—and that's more than one can usually say about The Walking Dead."

Forbes' Erik Kain also praised the performances and Besley's direction, writing: "Gilliam, Marquand and Patrick were all tremendous in "One More" and the writing, direction, music, cinematography were all top-notch. If this show could be this good consistently, I might look forward to watching it more each week."

=== Ratings ===
The episode was seen by 2.17 million viewers in the United States on its original air date, below the previous episode.
