= Find Me (The Walking Dead) =

- The Walking Dead episode
- Episode no.: Season 10; Episode 18
- Directed by: David Boyd
- Written by: Nicole Mirante-Matthews
- Cinematography by: Duane Charles Manwiller
- Editing by: Jack Colwell
- Original air dates: March 5, 2021 (AMC+); March 7, 2021 (AMC)
- Running time: 42 minutes

Guest appearance
- Lynn Collins as Leah

Episode chronology
← Previous "Home Sweet Home"	Next → "One More"
- The Walking Dead season 10

"Find Me" is the eighteenth episode of the tenth season of the post-apocalyptic horror television series The Walking Dead. The 149th episode overall, the episode was directed by David Boyd and written by Nicole Mirante-Matthews. "Find Me" was released on the streaming platform AMC+ on March 5, 2021, and aired on television on AMC two days later, on March 7.

== Plot ==
While preparing to go hunting, Daryl is approached by Carol, who offers to accompany him, which he reluctantly agrees to. While the two of them cook some fish that Carol speared, she says that the recent loss of the Hilltop and attack on Alexandria have caused her to wonder if their luck is beginning to run out; Daryl disagrees. Dog unexpectedly runs off, and the two follow him to an old cabin. Carol proposes that they spend the night there, before realizing that the cabin has sentimental value to Daryl.

Daryl recounts the story to Carol through flashbacks. Five years ago, shortly after Rick's supposed death, Daryl wanders the woods alone trying to find any sign of him, dead or alive. Carol occasionally meets with him to give supplies. After one such meeting, Daryl is approached by a Belgian Malinois puppy, who leads him to a cabin. Upon entering the cabin, Daryl is taken hostage and interrogated by an unknown woman, but she soon lets him go when he explains that he doesn't want to hurt her. She refuses to tell Daryl her name; he asks what the dog's name is, and she says that she simply calls him "Dog". Over the next several months, the two periodically cross paths, with Daryl returning Dog when he runs away, and offering her a fish that he caught. She reveals her name, Leah, and the two begin to bond romantically, with Daryl staying at her cabin more often.

The pair bond through hunting, fishing, and watching a solar eclipse together. One night, Daryl catches her looking at a photo of her son, which she keeps under the floorboards, and she recounts the story of how she lost her family and the Army platoon she had been surviving with. Dog was born on the same day, and Leah kept him as a memento of the family she lost. Fed up with his obsession with the search for Rick, Leah urges him to choose between looking for Rick, going back to Alexandria, or staying with her. Daryl chooses to continue searching for Rick. After an unknown period of time, Daryl returns to the cabin hoping to make amends, but finds Leah missing, along with the pictures under the floorboards. He leaves several cans of food under the floorboards, along with a message saying that he wants to be with her and encouraging her to try to find him.

In the present, Carol and Daryl begin to argue about the events of Rick and Connie, with Daryl blaming himself for the former and Carol for the latter. Carol tries to calm him down, saying that she needs him as a friend, but Daryl tells her that he is tired of always having the same conversations and that he regrets having dissuaded her from leaving. He tells her that he won't stop her from running away anymore, as he has in the past. Through her tears, Carol tells him that she was right about their luck having run out.

== Production ==
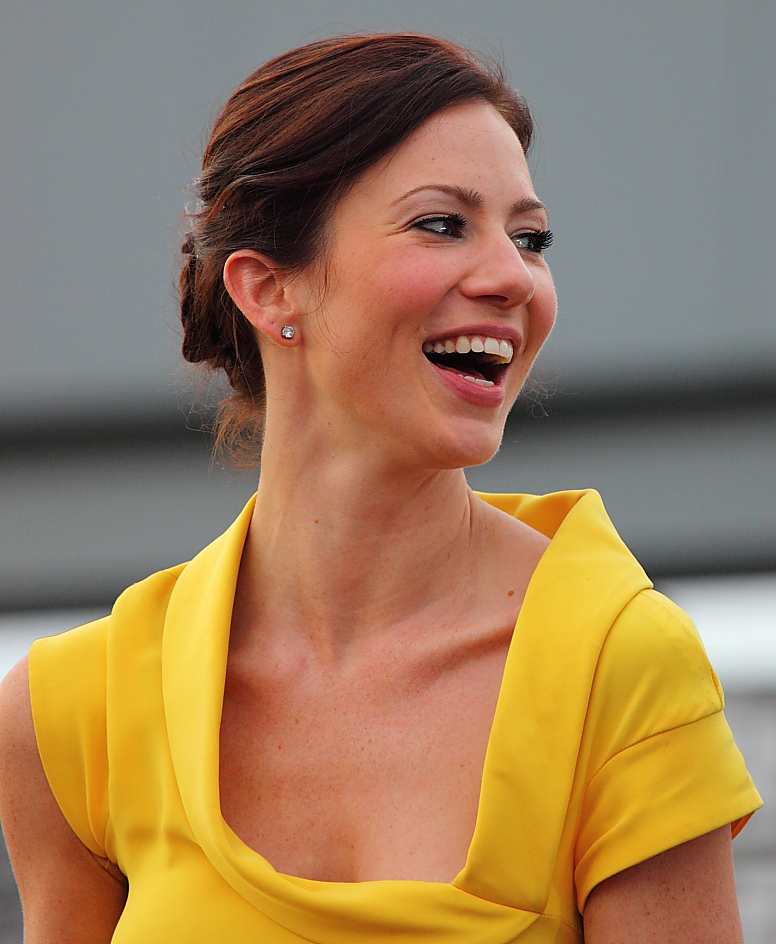
Lynn Collins made a guest appearance in the episode as Leah.

This episode features Lynn Collins as Leah, who forms a romantic bond with Daryl. Her casting was first announced on December 29, 2020.

== Reception ==
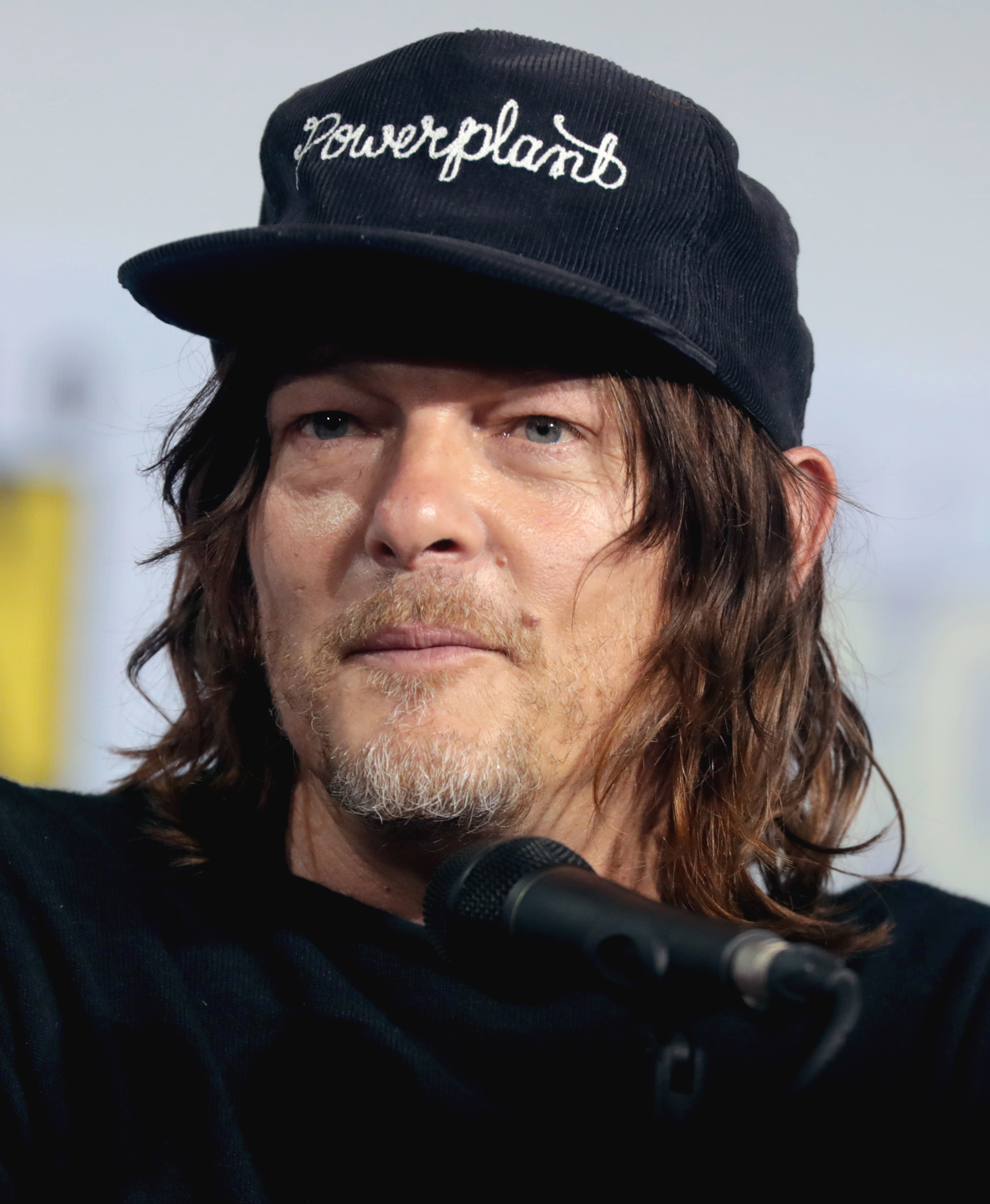
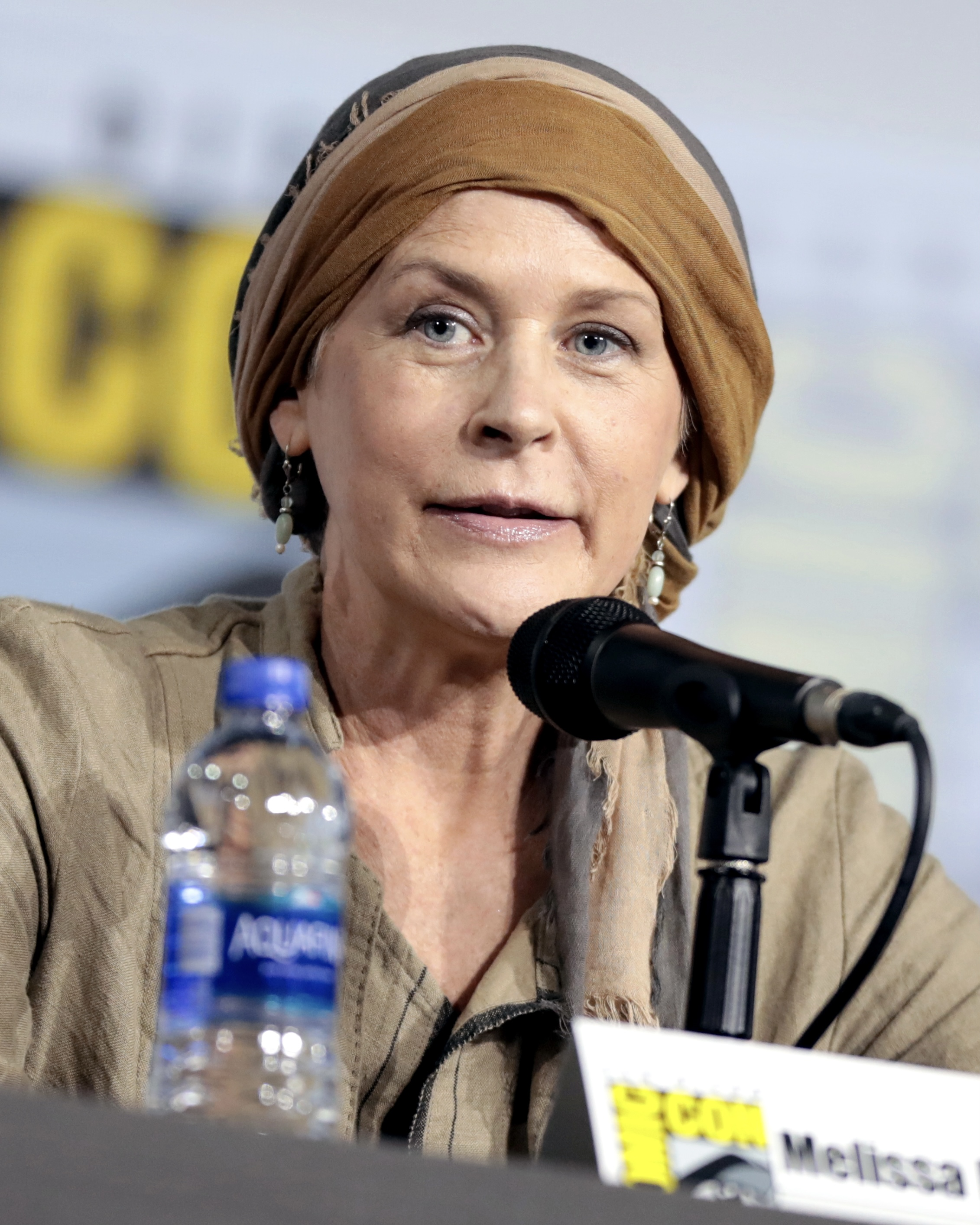
Norman Reedus (Daryl Dixon) and Melissa McBride (Carol Peletier) were the only regular actors to appear in the episode. Reedus was praised for his performance by critics.

=== Critical reception ===
"Find Me" received polarized reviews when compared to the rest of Season 10. On Rotten Tomatoes, the episode has an approval rating of 64% with an average score of 6.11/10 out of 10, based on 14 reviews. The site's critical consensus reads: "'Find Me' feels like a meandering look back when The Walking Dead should be forging ahead, but Norman Reedus' stoic appeal and striking cinematography keep this installment compelling."

Noetta Harjo writing for Geek Girl Authority praised the episode, writing: "I liked this little story. It was a chance to show another side of Daryl's character that we've never seen before. Norman Reedus is a good actor and we actually got to see more of his range this past Walking Dead season." Ron Hogan of Den of Geek gave the episode a 4/5 rating, praising Lynn Collins' performance, and wrote: "Collins, in particular, does a masterful job of presenting a fully formed character in a handful of scenes."

Aaron Neuwirth of We Live Entertainment in his review gave a good review of the episode and wrote: "These bonus season ten episodes occupy a strange space, so I'm still unsure if they'll sum up to some larger theme being shared between them. That said, as far as closed-off character pieces go, the episode works well enough." Paul Daily of TV Fanatic gave the episode a 4/5 rating, praising the episode, and wrote: "I know these bonus episodes are set to be smaller in scale, but if they all live up to the high bar set by "Find Me," they will be worth the wait."

Rob Bricken of io9 gave the episode a mixed review, writing: "Tonight's episode likewise let Carol and Daryl have the show practically to themselves, but with diminished results. However, even a ho-hum D&C Power Hour is a solid episode of The Walking Dead." Alex McLevy of The A.V. Club gave a mixed review and a grade rating of a "C", and wrote: "Some excellent Carol/Daryl conversations bookend this episode, but all the sodden stuff in between never feels like anything more than rushed backstory."

=== Ratings ===
The episode was seen by 2.26 million viewers in the United States on its original air date, below the previous episode.
