= Look at the Flowers =

- The Walking Dead episode
- Episode no.: Season 10; Episode 14
- Directed by: Daisy von Scherler Mayer
- Written by: Channing Powell
- Cinematography by: Jalaludin Trautmann
- Editing by: Tiffany Melvin
- Original air date: March 29, 2020
- Running time: 50 minutes

Guest appearances
- Paola Lázaro as Juanita "Princess" Sanchez; Kerry Cahill as Dianne; Nadine Marissa as Nabila; Mark Sivertsen as Rufus; Alex Livinalli as Shotgun Whisperer

Episode chronology
← Previous "What We Become"	Next → "The Tower"
- The Walking Dead season 10

"Look at the Flowers" is the fourteenth episode of the tenth season of the post-apocalyptic horror television series The Walking Dead, which aired on AMC on March 29, 2020. The episode was written by Channing Powell and directed by Daisy von Scherler Mayer.

After the death of Alpha (Samantha Morton), heroes and villains reckon with the aftermath of the Hilltop fire. Meanwhile, Eugene (Josh McDermitt) takes a group on a journey to meet Stephanie, with the hopes of befriending another civilization.

This episode marks the final appearance of Samantha Morton as Alpha and the first appearance of Paola Lázaro as Juanita "Princess" Sanchez, a character adapted from the comics. The episode received positive reviews from critics.

== Plot ==
In a flashback, Carol gives the imprisoned Negan the offer to bring her Alpha's head in exchange for clearing his name. In the present, Carol places Alpha's disembodied but still moving head atop a pike. Negan then demands Carol to hold up her end of the deal, but Carol criticizes how long it took him to complete his mission and tells him he can wait until she's ready or face the community, whom he fears.

Elsewhere, the survivors of the Hilltop gather to make sure the children are safe. Rosita encourages Eugene to tell the group about his radio contact and planned meeting with Stephanie. While there are concerns about being led into another trap, they agree Eugene should keep the meeting; Eugene, Ezekiel, and Yumiko set off to a downtown area.

Meanwhile, Beta and two Whisperers find Alpha's head. Enraged, Beta forces one of the Whisperers to get bitten by the head after he unwisely identifies Beta as the "new Alpha"; the other Whisperer flees. He then takes the head and travels to his former home in a nearby town. In a fit of rage, he destroys much of his former home.

Beforehand, Negan goes to free Lydia, but is instead greeted by a punch and interrogated by Daryl. The former explains Alpha's fate at his hands, but Daryl doesn't believe him. Meanwhile Carol goes off on her own and starts to have visions of Alpha, taunting Carol and comparing her to herself, with no solace in isolation.

That night, at the pike where Alpha's head is missing, Negan and Daryl find themselves surrounded by three Whisperers, having learned of Alpha's fate and treating Negan as the "new Alpha". Negan, pretending to go along with the Whisperers to get them off guard, uses the opportunity to kill the Whisperers to prove his loyalty to Alexandria, freeing Daryl in the process. Meanwhile at the nearby town, Beta has been listening to his own music, as it is revealed he was a former country music singer named "Half Moon". He then turns on his music loudly as to attract a huge horde of walkers.

The next morning, when Carol gets briefly trapped in the rubble of a collapsing ceiling with a walker approaching, the vision of Alpha suggests to Carol that she "look at the flowers" (Note: A reference to Carol's line before she was forced to kill Lizzie in "The Grove") and accept death, but Carol breaks free in time to put down the walker; the vision of Alpha disperses.

Within the city, after discovering a tableau of walkers arranged in humorous situations, Ezekiel, Eugene, and Yumiko encounter a young woman excited to see them. Meanwhile Beta, having achieved catharsis, thanks Alpha, puts the head down, and uses part of her skin to repair his mask. Beta then starts to lead the massive horde toward a new destination.

== Production ==
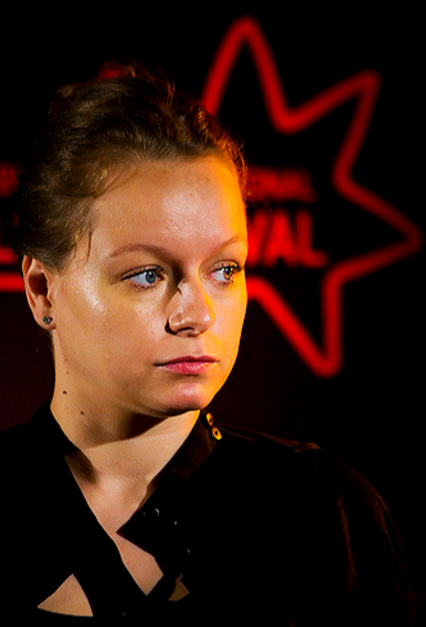
Appearing as a vision in Carol's (Melissa McBride) hallucinations, Samantha Morton makes her final appearance as Alpha.

As of this episode, Danai Gurira is removed from the opening credits. This is the first time in the series since season two that her name does not appear. After her character is killed in "Walk with Us", Samantha Morton returns as Alpha in Carol's (Melissa McBride) hallucinations while the episode also marks the departure of Morton, who first appeared in the season nine mid-season premiere episode "Adaptation".

The episode's title derives from a line Carol speaks to Lizzie (Brighton Sharbino) before Carol is forced to kill her from the season four episode "The Grove". According to showrunner Angela Kang, the idea of the episode came mostly from its writer Channing Powell in how Carol would react once Alpha was dead and her revenge was complete, reflecting on how the character had to do a number of dark actions herself, such as killing Lizzie, in her past.

The episode introduces Juanita "Princess" Sanchez (Paola Lázaro), a character adapted from the comic book series. Whereas in the comics, the group meets her in Pittsburgh rather than Virginia. She is shown to still be a survivor that has been in complete isolation and developed quirky ways to deal with her isolation. Within the comics, Princess' introduction begins the final major arc of the comics: The introduction of The Commonwealth—a group and network of communities that the combined Alexandria Safe-Zone residents eventually join which only creates additional tensions. It was first introduced in "Volume 29", "Issue #173" of Robert Kirkman's original comic book series.

The identity of Beta (Ryan Hurst) as famed country music singer "Half Moon" was a device that was unique to the television series. Within the comics, Beta was a former basketball player, but Hurst did not have that appearance. While the writers considered other sports, Hurst suggested the idea of a country singer like Garth Brooks, who has a one-off alter ego—Chris Gaines. The writers used this idea to consider that the former singer had a darker side that came out in the zombie apocalypse. They planted this idea earlier in the season with a song, titled "The Turtle and the Monkey", that Magna (Nadia Hilker) listens to on a phonograph, which was written by Emily Kinney (who had played Beth Greene in the series) and sung by Hurst in episode five. The second song heard in this episode is titled "I Went to the Well", which was released in its entirety by AMC on April 1, 2020. A record cover of "Half Moon" with Hurst's face had also been shown in the fifth season of Fear the Walking Dead.

== Reception ==
=== Critical reception ===
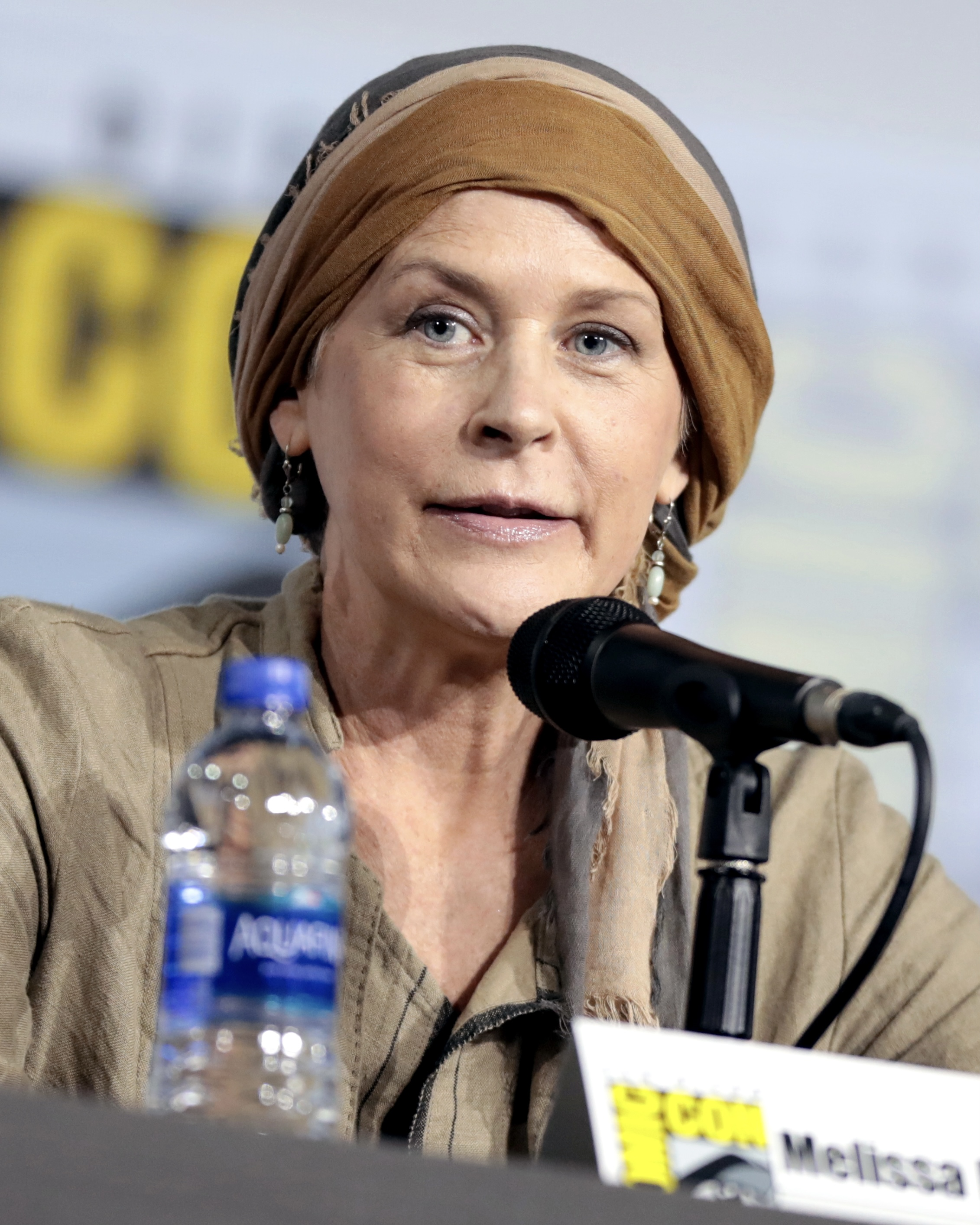
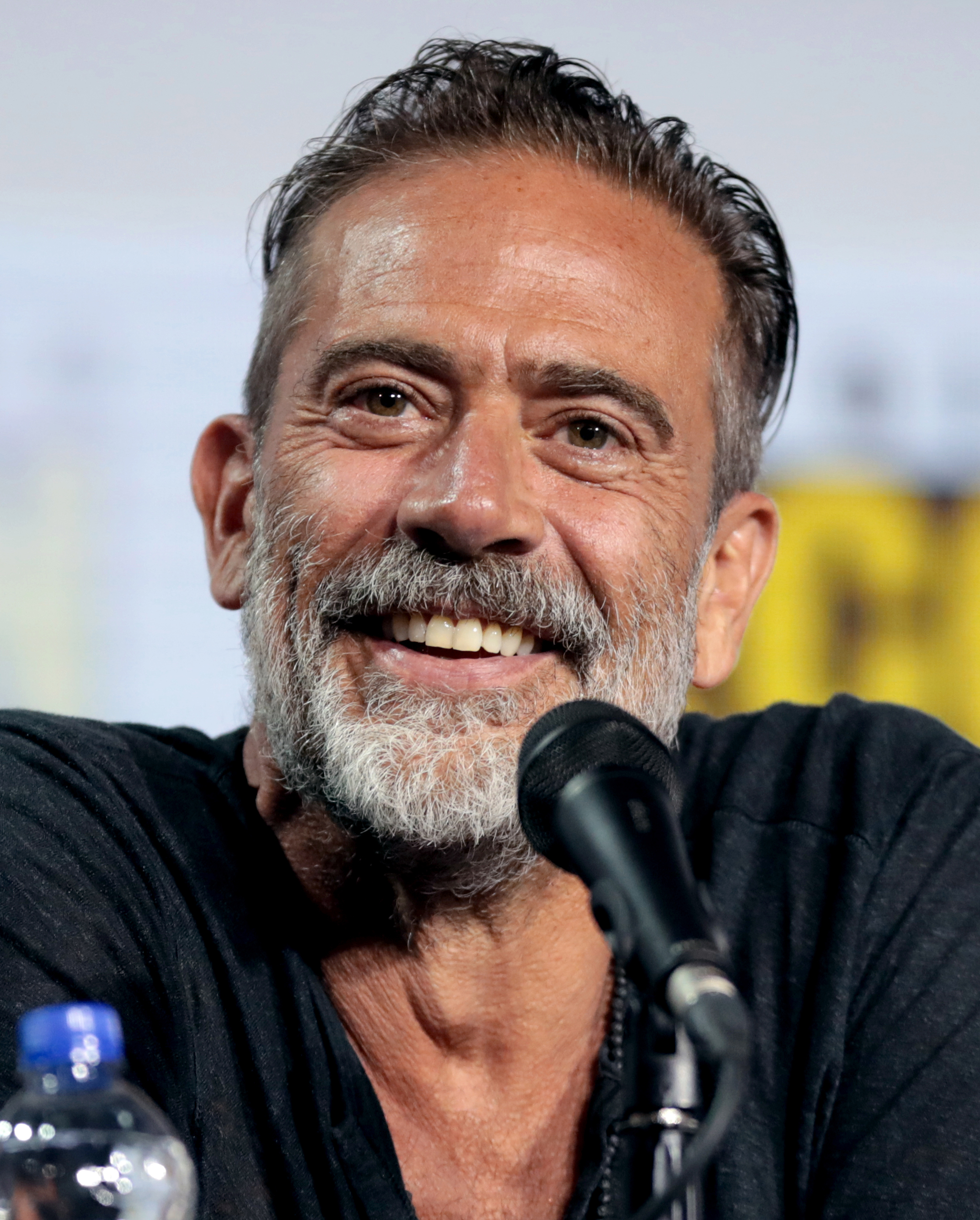
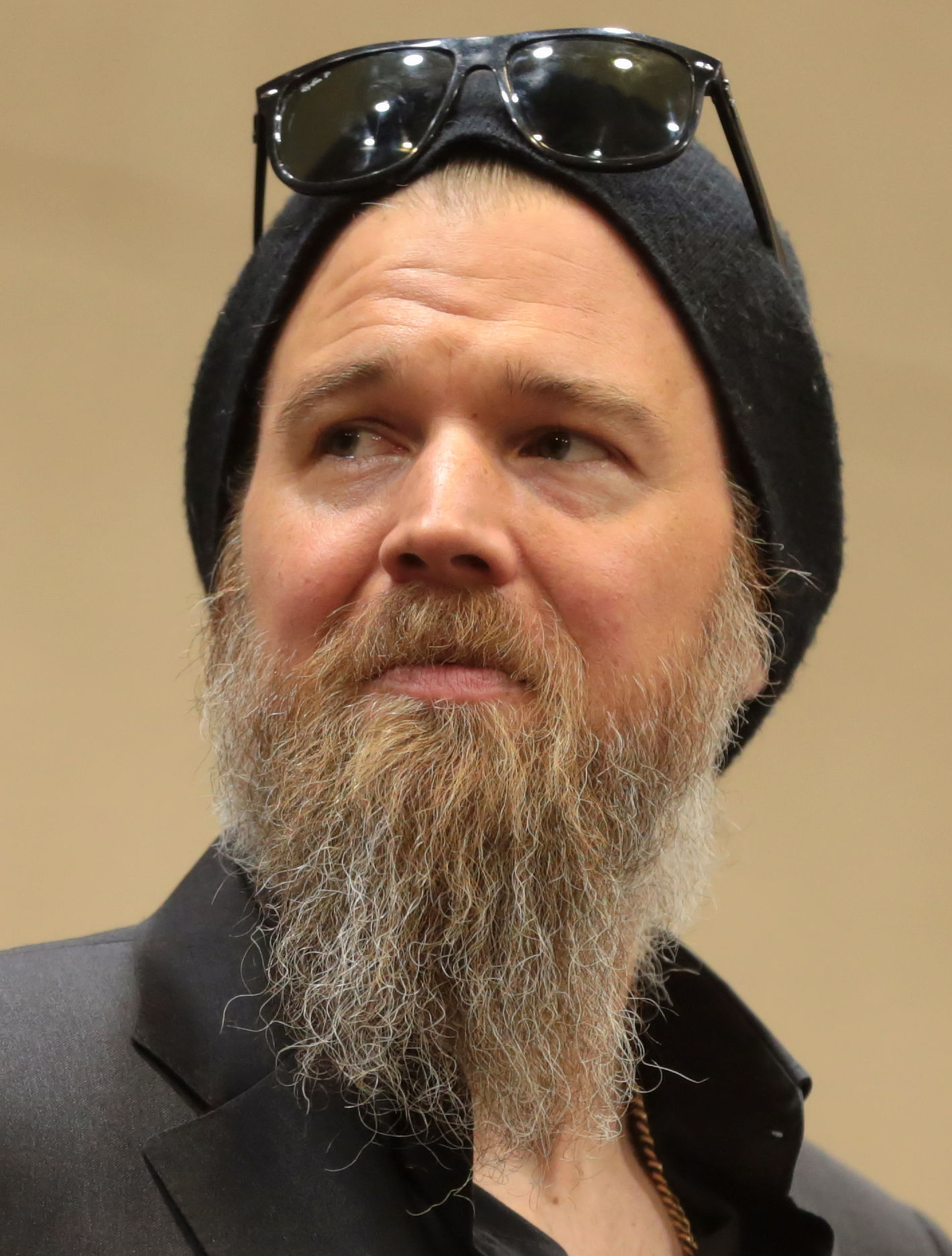
The development of Melissa McBride, Jeffrey Dean Morgan, and Ryan Hurst's characters were praised by critics.

"Look at the Flowers" received positive reviews. On Rotten Tomatoes, the episode has an approval rating of 88% with an average score of 6.80 out of 10, based on 17 reviews. The site's critical consensus reads: "'Look at the Flowers' dives back into the conflict between the Hilltop crew and the Whisperers with a richly introspective episode that explores the far-reaching impact of Alpha's demise."

Ron Hogan of Den of Geek praised the character development of Negan, writing: "Negan, despite everything, is still funny. Eugene has never not been funny, particularly when Josh McDermitt starts motoring his mouth around that very thick dialogue provided by Channing Powell's excellent script." Noetta Harjo of Geek Girl Authority praised the episode, writing: "Sooo, Carol wrote a letter to Maggie about Alpha. I'm really hoping Maggie shows up in the next episode. That was interesting to watch Alpha tell Carol her thoughts."

Writing for The A.V. Club, Alex McLevy gave the episode a B− and wrote: "A good portion of it worked at least reasonably well. This is partially thanks to a script that only overcooks half of the dialogue scenes." Writing for TV Fanatic, Paul Dailly praised the episode and wrote: "'Look at the Flowers' was mostly an episode to set up the coming events, and boy, we're in for a wild ride to the finish line." Writing for We Live Entertainment, Aaron Neuwirth praised Jeffrey Dean Morgan's performance and wrote: "Allowing Jeffrey Dean Morgan the chance to play up multiple sides of Negan is effective."

Matt Fowler of IGN gave the episode a 7 out of 10, writing: "Though some of Carol's meandering, and Ezekiel's trek, felt trite, "Look at the Flowers" was still busy enough overall to plant seeds for more interesting things to come... It was a cool-down chapter, but an effective one." Erik Kain of Forbes praised the character development of Beta, writing: "This was mostly a very good episode. Beta is a very scary guy, and the end suggests that the full force of his wrath and vengeance is about to be unleashed on our heroes."

=== Ratings ===
"Look at the Flowers" received 3.26 million viewers and was the highest-rated cable program of the night.
