= A Certain Doom =

- The Walking Dead episode
- Episode no.: Season 10; Episode 16
- Directed by: Greg Nicotero
- Story by: Jim Barnes; Eli Jorné; Corey Reed
- Teleplay by: Corey Reed
- Cinematography by: Stephen Campbell
- Editing by: Alan Cody
- Original air date: October 4, 2020
- Running time: 45 minutes

Guest appearances
- Dan Fogler as Luke; Kevin Carroll as Virgil; Paola Lázaro as Juanita "Princess" Sanchez; Kenric Green as Scott; Angel Theory as Kelly; Avianna Mynhier as Rachel Ward; Kerry Cahill as Dianne; Nadine Marissa as Nabila; Karen Ceesay as Bertie; Lauren Cohan as Maggie Greene; Alex Sgambati as Jules; Briana Venskus as Beatrice; Gustavo Gomez as Marco; Anthony Lopez as Oscar; Anabelle Holloway as Gracie; Antony Azor as R.J. Grimes; Grace Toso as Rotted Female Whisperer

Episode chronology
← Previous "The Tower"	Next → "Home Sweet Home"
- The Walking Dead season 10

"A Certain Doom" is the sixteenth episode and second-part finale of the tenth season of the post-apocalyptic horror television series The Walking Dead, which aired on AMC on October 4, 2020. The episode's teleplay was written by Corey Reed, from a story by Jim Barnes, Eli Jorné and Reed, and directed by Greg Nicotero.

The episode was originally scheduled to air on April 12, 2020 as the season finale. However, AMC announced on March 24, 2020 that post-production to the episode was delayed due to the COVID-19 pandemic and instead aired on October 4, 2020. AMC also announced that the tenth season would include six additional episodes, which aired from February 28 to April 4, 2021.

This episode also marks the return of Maggie Greene (Lauren Cohan), who had been absent since the previous season episode "What Comes After". The episode received positive reviews from critics.

== Plot ==
Engaging the final battle of the Whisperer War, Beta has led the gigantic horde to the Tower, where the survivors inside scramble to adjust their plan for survival. Gabriel orders several pairs of survivors to sneak pieces of a speaker system out past the horde onto a wagon to be pulled by horses, which the survivors will use to play music and lure the horde to the ocean to destroy them. Daryl, Carol, Jerry, Magna, Luke, Kelly, Beatrice, and Jules decide to venture through the horde covered in walker guts to engineer the escape plan. Before Carol departs, Lydia makes amends with her, but Carol instead insists to Lydia that she needs to make her own way.

The group begin sifting through the horde, with Whisperers being picked off by archers. Most of the group manages to evade the horde and flee into the woods. Carol manages to mortally wound a Whisperer that attacks her and Beatrice, but the dying Whisperer wounds Beatrice, forcing Carol to leave her behind as she is discovered and killed by the horde. The survivors set up Luke's sound system and begin playing Talking Heads' "Burning Down the House" on repeat, successfully luring the horde away from the Tower, and giving the people inside an opportunity to escape. Beta and most of the Whisperers stay with the horde, and catch up to the wagon as night falls, killing Hilltop soldier Oscar and destroying the speakers after forcing the group to retreat and abandon the wagon. Hiding in the woods, and without any other plans, Daryl orders the group to go back and hunt down the Whisperers in the horde one by one. Lydia volunteers to continue to lead the horde away, since her mother taught her how; Daryl rebuffs her, but Lydia, however, is adamant. Daryl decides they will deal with it later and tells the others to move.

Meanwhile at the Tower, most of the group has evacuated thanks to the absence of the horde, but Gabriel stays behind to hold off the remaining Whisperers. Gabriel is nearly killed, but he is saved by a hooded, masked warrior in the company of Maggie Greene, who has returned after reading a letter from Carol informing her about the Whisperers. The pair were also able to save Aaron and Alden from a group of Whisperers that had surrounded them earlier. Outside, Beta notices the Whisperers around him are being killed by the survivors. He then spots Lydia and prepares to attack her, but is interrupted by Negan. Seeking revenge for Negan's assassination of Alpha, he furiously charges at Negan and tackles him to the ground, and prepares to finish him off. Suddenly, Daryl intervenes and stabs Beta in each eye, saving Negan in the process. The two then watch as Beta is consumed and devoured by the walkers; in his final moments, Beta remembers the Whisperers' creed of embracing all death and smiles happily as he imagines the horde embracing him. Once Beta's mask is ripped off, Negan recognizes him from before the apocalypse, but Daryl shrugs it off.

Come daytime, Lydia, wearing Alpha's mask, successfully leads the horde to a cliff, intending this task as a suicide mission. Before she can go over, Lydia is stopped by Carol, who volunteers to go instead of her, dubbing it her choice. Carol reaches the edge, but before she can step off, Lydia pulls her back. The pair take cover and embrace behind a rock, as the walkers around them march off the cliff into the waters below. As Carol thanks Lydia, the latter rips off her mother's mask and tosses it over the cliff. With the Whisperers no longer a threat, the survivors regroup in the woods outside the Tower. There, Maggie reunites with Judith while Daryl asks Carol if she got what she wanted. She replies that she didn't, but didn't really want it anyway. Daryl tells her that she still has him; they hug. Elsewhere, Connie is revealed to be alive, albeit weak and malnourished. After collapsing on the road, she is found by Virgil, who is revealed to have returned to the mainland and traveled to Oceanside only to find it empty.

At night, Eugene's group has finally reached the trainyard which was designated as the intended rendezvous point to meet Stephanie. After suffering a bicycle crash earlier, Eugene initially believes he has missed his meeting with Stephanie, but declares they'll continue to go looking for her after being inspired by Ezekiel. The group is then suddenly accosted by a large group of heavily armed soldiers wearing white and red body armor, who order them to drop their weapons and get on their knees at gunpoint.

== Production ==
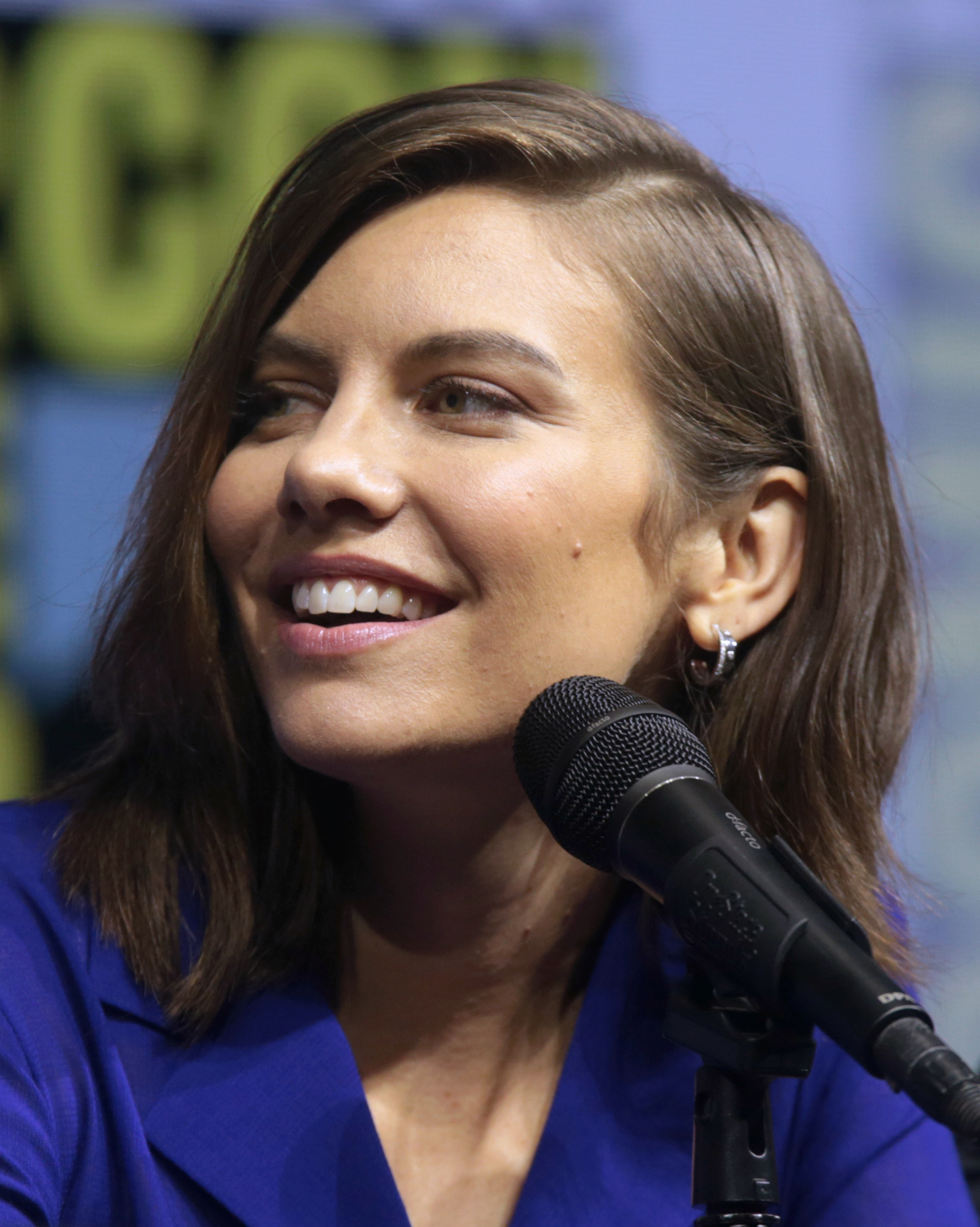
Lauren Cohan returned to the series in the role of Maggie Greene after departing in November 2018.

"A Certain Doom" had initially been planned as the tenth season finale to air on April 12, 2020, but due to the COVID-19 pandemic, AMC announced on March 24, 2020 that the episode would be delayed. Showrunner Angela Kang explained that while the episode had completed filming, the work on post-production visual effects could not be completed on time due to the pandemic. The episode's airdate was confirmed in July 2020 for October 4, 2020, as well as six additional episodes to the tenth season, which aired from February 28 to April 4, 2021, since the eleventh and final season would be delayed due to the pandemic.

Lauren Cohan returned to the series in her role as Maggie Greene, who had left the series in the ninth season after being cast for a leading role in the ABC television series Whiskey Cavalier. Cohan and the showrunners had not considered her character to be written off the series completely then, and left the potential for her return in later seasons depending on Cohan's availability. With the cancellation of Whiskey Cavalier after one season, Cohan was able to return as a series regular for the final season, which allowed the showrunners to work her character into the ongoing plot.

The episode also marks the departure of Ryan Hurst, who portrayed Beta since the previous season episode "Guardians", as his character is stabbed by Daryl (Norman Reedus) and then devoured by walkers.

The selection of Talking Heads' "Burning Down the House" was a choice made after the script was completed, calling only for some piece of rock music to help draw the walkers away from the hospital. Kang said many of the staff were Talking Heads fans and were drawn to the song since its lyrics matched the theme of the scene with the survivors up against impossible odds. The song itself was an expensive piece of music to license for the episode, but other options they tried did not work as well, so they opted to pay more for the rights.

The episode also introduces the Commonwealth, a large community that is central to the last major arc in the comic book series. According to Kang, they had intended to have the season ten finale end with the Commonwealth's introduction.

== Reception ==
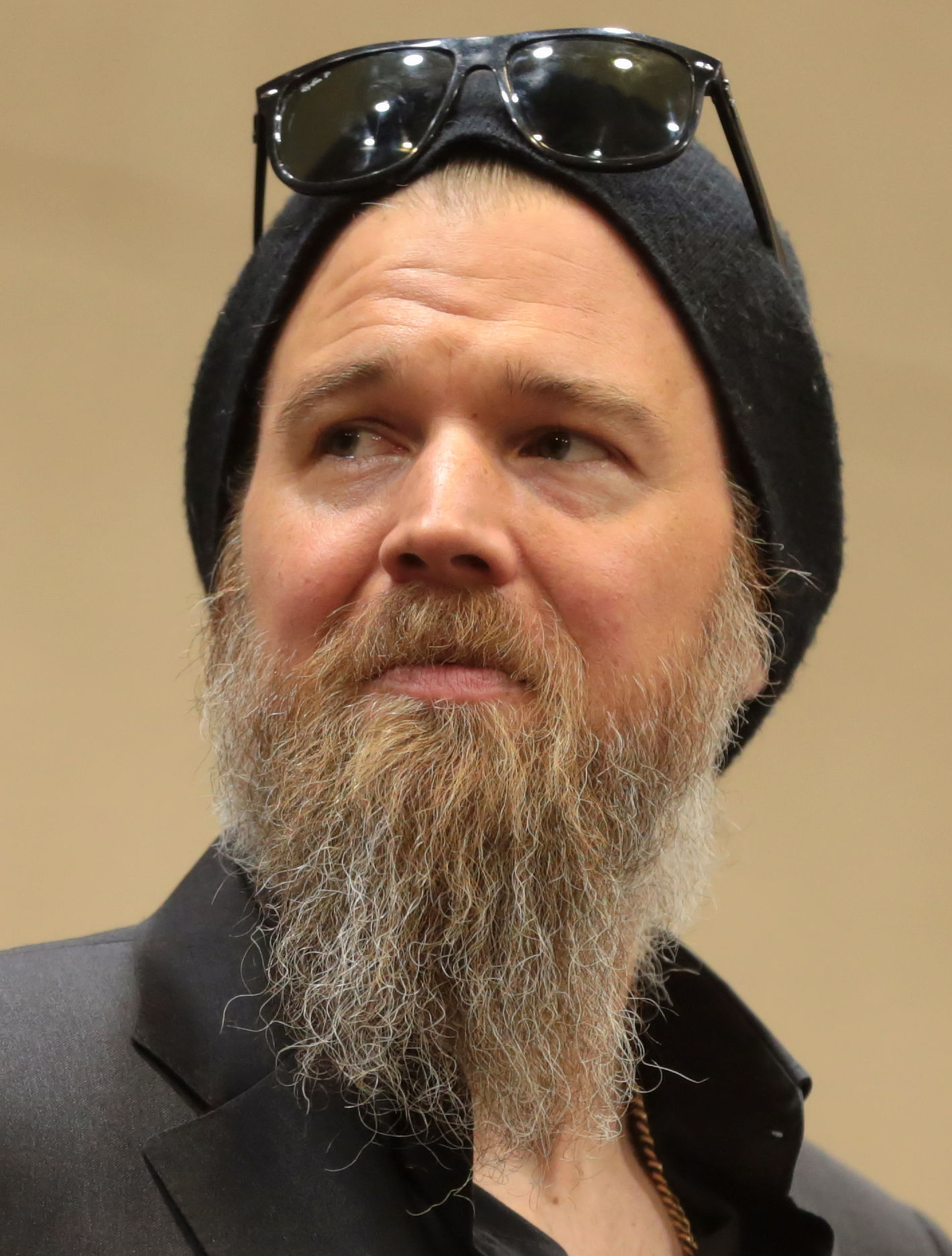
Ryan Hurst made his final regular appearance in this episode after his character has two daggers shoved into his eyes by Daryl and is devoured by a horde of walkers. Hurst's performance was highly acclaimed by critics.

=== Critical reception ===
"A Certain Doom" received positive reviews. On Rotten Tomatoes, the episode has an approval rating of 89% with an average score of 6.80 out of 10, based on 18 reviews. The site's critical consensus reads: "The Whisperers are finally shushed for good in 'A Certain Doom,' a tidy climax that efficiently dispenses with old enemies while teeing up a fresh crop of antagonists."

Jeffrey Lyles, who writes for Lyles Movie Files, gave it an 8/10 rating, writing: "This didn't feel as satisfying as it was months after Negan killed Alpha and Beta vowed revenge, but in binge format I'm betting this will feel like a well-earned payoff." Ron Hogan of Den of Geek gave the episode a 4/5 rating, praising Nicotero's direction, and wrote: "One thing you can say about Greg Nicotero as a director, he knows exactly how he wants his special effects to look, and he shoots them in their full glory." Writing for Insider, Kirsten Acuna gave the episode a B+ rating, writing: "I wouldn't exactly call it much of a war. However, it's still a satisfying conclusion to what has been one of the most enjoyable seasons of "TWD" in years where Kang made major changes from the comics." John Doyle of The Globe and Mail also praised the episode, writing: "It's grim but passing-good, like our lives now." Writing for IGN, Matt Fowler gave the episode an average rating of 7/10 and praised the episode, writing: "The Walking Dead's Season 10 finale contained solid thrills and appropriately tense moments but it faltered when it came to larger, memorable story beats."

Writing for The A.V. Club, Alex McLevy gave the episode a B, writing: "The back half of season 10 has been strong, and this installment makes for a fitting conclusion, given that it also dispatches its threat with a minimum of fuss." Richard Rys, who writes for Vulture, gave the episode an average rating of 3/5, writing: "Maybe this episode will hold up better under a binge-watching schedule, but waiting so long for a fairly predictable end to long-dangling story lines felt a bit anticlimactic." Erik Kain of Forbes praised the episode, writing: "Overall this was a perfectly fine season finale. I have some gripes but they [sic] biggest one is just that it felt kind of flat compared to earlier episodes this season."

=== Ratings ===
"A Certain Doom" received 2.73 million viewers, down from the previous episode's rating and the lowest of the original season ten run.
