= The Tower (The Walking Dead) =

- The Walking Dead episode
- Episode no.: Season 10; Episode 15
- Directed by: Laura Belsey
- Written by: Kevin Deiboldt; Julia Ruchman
- Cinematography by: Duane Charles Manwiller
- Editing by: Jack Colwell
- Original air date: April 5, 2020
- Running time: 42 minutes

Guest appearances
- Paola Lázaro as Juanita "Princess" Sanchez; Angel Theory as Kelly; Avianna Mynhier as Rachel Ward; Kerry Cahill as Dianne; Karen Ceesay as Bertie; Jessica Pohly as Dark Haired Whisperer; Alex Sgambati as Jules; Anthony Lopez as Oscar; Gustavo Gómez as Marco; Philip Fornah as Whisperer; Stefan Rollins as Rifle Whisperer; Louis Zehner as Talking Charred Hero Walker

Episode chronology
← Previous "Look at the Flowers"	Next → "A Certain Doom"
- The Walking Dead season 10

"The Tower" is the fifteenth episode of the tenth season of the post-apocalyptic horror television series The Walking Dead, which aired on AMC on April 5, 2020. The episode was written by Kevin Deiboldt and Julia Ruchman, and directed by Laura Belsey.

As Beta (Ryan Hurst) plans his next move to eliminate the survivors, the communities prepare for the final battle of the Whisperer War. Meanwhile, Eugene's (Josh McDermitt) group encounters Juanita "Princess" Sanchez (Paola Lázaro).

"The Tower" was originally the penultimate episode of the tenth season and was the final episode to air of the tenth season before the series went on hiatus in April 2020 due to the COVID-19 pandemic. The original intended season finale, "A Certain Doom", was delayed due to post-production delays. "A Certain Doom" eventually aired on October 4, 2020, along with the confirmation that the tenth season would include an extra six episodes, which aired from February 28 to April 4, 2021. The episode received positive reviews from critics.

== Plot ==
Princess introduces herself to Eugene, Ezekiel, and Yumiko, but as they are trying to figure out her personality, a group of walkers appear. Before they can stop her, Princess uses a machine gun to put down the walkers, which frightens their horses away. Princess apologizes and says she knows where they can get transportation.

Elsewhere, Beta has arrived at Alexandria with the horde, but finds it apparently empty. Unbeknownst to him, all the residents have fled to a nearby hospital (referred to as the "Tower"), with only Alden and Aaron staying behind in order to spy on the horde and radio their observations to Gabriel. As he discusses their next assault with the other Whisperers, Beta begins to hear voices in his head. He then decides to retreat and begins to lead the horde toward Oceanside; Aaron informs Gabriel that they are heading toward Oceanside as expected.

As Eugene's group walks across the city, the trio find Princess' directions to be erratic. At one point, they walk through a live minefield where they find the remains of their horses; Eugene later realizes they could have taken a much quicker route. Princess again apologizes, admitting she's been alone for so long and only wanted to endear herself to them. She takes them to a garage with transportation – bicycles – and the trio prepares to depart for their meeting with Stephanie.

Meanwhile outside the hospital, Carol and Kelly scavenge wires from some cars during an errand for Luke. While scavenging, Carol apologizes to Kelly about her actions in the cave, but Kelly thinks nothing of it and believes that Connie is still alive. Inside, Negan apologizes to Lydia for killing her mother. However, Lydia emotionally struggles with both her anger toward Negan for the act, but also letting out her hatred of Alpha.

Out in the woods, after finding Judith out on her own, Daryl teaches her some of his own survival tips. After this Daryl shoots, interrogates, and kills a nearby Whisperer, much to Judith's dismay. Concurrently, Beta continues leading the horde toward Oceanside, but suddenly stops when he feels something is amiss and begins to suspect that the survivors are leading him into a trap. Just then, he spots one of the hospital cats prowling and the voices in Beta's head then direct him toward the hospital. Alden and Aaron, who have been following the horde from a distance, notice it changing direction and try to contact Gabriel. Failing to get a signal, the two decide to retreat, but are unexpectedly surrounded by a group of Whisperers.

Negan and Lydia have a cathartic talk at the hospital, and eventually embrace, while at the city, Yumiko, frustrated with Princess, has a change of heart and allows her to join the group. Meanwhile in the woods, Judith tearfully tells Daryl that she has become more concerned about losing more of her family after Michonne's departure, including Daryl. In response, Daryl says that, while he can't promise that he will never leave, he knows she has a larger family than just him. Immediately after their talk, Daryl is contacted by Gabriel over walkie-talkie; Gabriel reveals that the hospital is surrounded by the horde. Once arriving outside the hospital, Beta begins to chant and hallucinates the walkers doing so too.

== Production ==
As of this episode, Samantha Morton is removed from the opening credits. After the airing of the episode, The Walking Dead went on hiatus as post-production was unable to be completed on the season finale, "A Certain Doom", due to the COVID-19 pandemic. As such, "The Tower" served as the (pseudo) season finale of the tenth season. The AMC Networks Twitter account stated the following: "Current events have unfortunately made it impossible to complete post-production of The Walking Dead Season 10 finale, so the current season will end with its 15th episode on April 5. The planned finale will appear as a special episode later in the year." Showrunner Angela Kang explained that the finale was delayed from its original April 12 airdate when post-production visual effects could not be completed on time due to the coronavirus pandemic. On July 24, 2020, "A Certain Doom" was confirmed to air on October 4, 2020.

The exterior of the hospital was the same one used for Grady Memorial Hospital in the first half of season five, where Beth Greene (Emily Kinney) was held captive by police officers. In addition, it was confirmed that Lauren Cohan would return as Maggie Greene in "A Certain Doom". Cohan was also confirmed returning as a series regular for season eleven. She left the series due to previous commitments she had made for the ABC television series Whiskey Cavalier, prior to signing on for the ninth season. On May 12, 2019, ABC canceled the series after one season.

== Reception ==
=== Critical reception ===
"The Tower" received positive reviews. On Rotten Tomatoes, the episode has an approval rating of 83% with an average score of 6.50 out of 10, based on 18 reviews. The site's critical consensus reads: "Though its myriad of lingering questions will no doubt frustrate fans, the introduction of the outrageously entertaining Princess breathes new life into TWD as 'The Tower' finds the series switching gears to great effect."

Noetta Harjo of Geek Girl Authority praised the episode and wrote: "This season of The Walking Dead has been so riveting. The writers did a great job of telling a full story and providing enough character development without straying too far from that story." Dustin Rowles of Uproxx praised the character development of Juanita "Princess" Sanchez and wrote: "Princess (who hasn't seen anyone in over a year) is a little off-kilter... but she is good people and will make a great addition to The Walking Dead cast. I love her."

Writing for TV Fanatic, Paul Dailly praised Paola Lázaro's performance as Princess and wrote: "Princess is a complicated personality, but the show has been on such a dark run that the comedic aspects she will bring to the show will only help switch things up." Alyse Wax of Syfy Wire also expressed praise for Lázaro's performance and wrote: "So... I think I love Princess... She is sassy and spunky and I am glad she is joining the cast." Writing for We Live Entertainment, Aaron Neuwirth also commended Lázaro's performance and wrote: "Paola Lazaro does well in bringing the Princess character to life." Kevin Lever of Tell-Tale TV praised the performance of Cailey Fleming as Judith Grimes and wrote: "There's a lot of great work being done with Judith that's fleshing her out as the kindest heart left in this world."

Matt Fowler of IGN applauded Lázaro's performance and gave the episode a 6 out of 10, writing: "Though Princess shined in her introduction, giving the world of the show a sunnier (yet still damaged) character to showcase, "The Tower" was still very much a connecting chapter meant to drive interest toward everything happening in the true finale." Erik Kain of Forbes praised Lázaro's performance, writing: "I love the wackiness of Princess, the horrorshow that Beta has become, the promise of a big, brutal final showdown, the Holy Quest that Eugene and his crew are on, promising to widen the scope and depth of this world for next season."

=== Ratings ===
"The Tower" received 3.49 million viewers, up from the previous episode's rating.
