= Paola Lázaro =

Puerto Rican actress

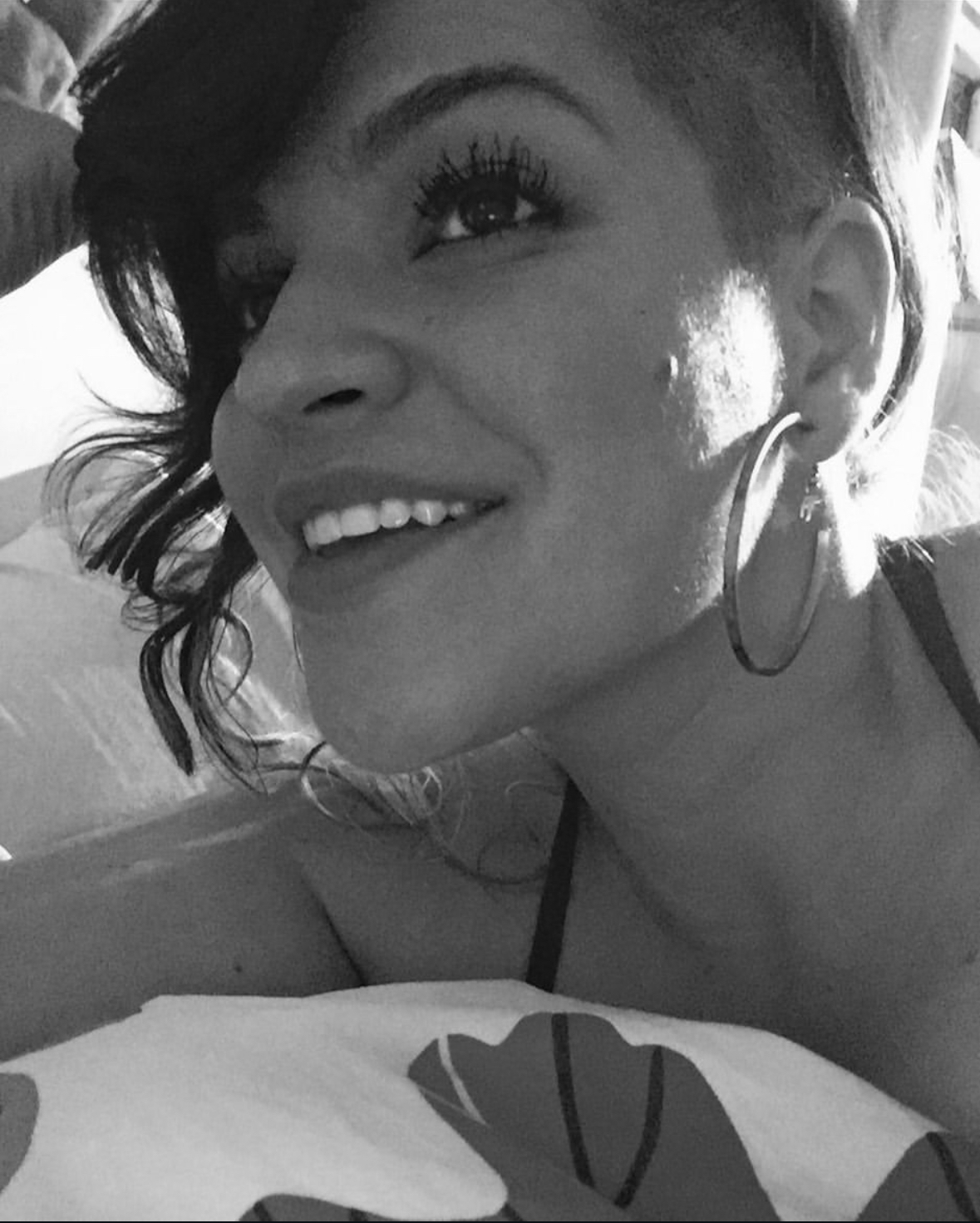
- Paola Lázaro - Walker Con
- Born: 24 October 1994 (age 31); San Juan, Puerto Rico, United States of America
- Other name: Paola Lázaro-Muñoz
- Education: Purchase College (BFA); Columbia University (MFA)
- Occupation: Actress
- Years active: 2014–present

Paola Lázaro (/pao-lah/ born October 24) is a Puerto Rican actress. She is best known for portraying Juanita "Princess" Sanchez on the AMC apocalyptic drama television series The Walking Dead (2020-2022) and Angela Gomez in the Netflix series Obliterated (2023).

== Early life ==
Lázaro was born and raised in San Juan, Puerto Rico. Lázaro later left to study at the State University of New York at Purchase. In 2010, she graduated as a Bachelor of Fine Arts with a degree in dramatic writing. Lázaro completed her Master's Degree in playwriting from Columbia University in 2013. At the end of her final year at Columbia, she was mentored by playwright Stephen Adly Guirgis over the course of the production of her thesis play. His presence has heavily influenced both her writing and her career. Lázaro also participated in the Emerging Young Writer's Group at the Public Theatre, worked on a summer program with Labyrinth Theatre Company, and received an Arts Entertainment Scholarship Award from the National Hispanic Foundation for the Arts.

== Career ==
After earning her M.F.A., Lázaro was asked to join Atlantic Theatre Company in New York City, as playwright-in-residence for the 2016–2017 season. This selective playwright-in-residency program was created by the Tow Foundation and provides funds to New York City theatre companies to support a playwright's production of a new work, and focused on Lázaro's new play, Tell Hector I Miss Him (2017). The play dramatizes a cast of eccentric characters in Old San Juan, Puerto Rico, coping with love, addiction, and fear. The Atlantic Theatre Company's production, directed by David Mendizabal, opened January 11, 2017 and was scheduled to close January 23; the run was extended due to popular demand. One reviewer described the play as “Our Town with salsa and cocaine.”

While Lázaro is dedicated to relating to Latinos everywhere through her playwriting, and is an actress as well. Under the direction of Lisa Peterson, Lázaro performed in Cherry Lane Theatre's recent production of Lisa Ramirez's To the Bone, a play based on interviews Ramirez conducted with Latina immigrant poultry workers. Lázaro played Lupe, daughter of Olga (played by Ramirez), a hip-hopping, skateboarding student of political science and law. Her work on this production is described as played with “vivacious urgency,” and it earned her a Drama Desk Award nomination for Outstanding Featured Actress in a Play. In 2017 she was acting in film, playing a sex worker in a drama called Pimp and an undercover officer in the film Scenes from the Underground.

Lázaro is a believer that Latinos should write their "own stories and create work for ourselves.”

In 2020, Lázaro was cast as Juanita "Princess" Sanchez on AMC's The Walking Dead.

== Personal life ==
Lázaro identifies as pansexual.

== Filmography ==
=== Film ===
| Year | Title | Role | Notes |
|---|---|---|---|
| 2016 | A Northern Star | Mateo's sister | Short film; credited as Paola Lazaro-Munoz |
| 2018 | Pimp | Louisa | |
| 2020 | Black Bear | Cahya | |

=== Television ===
| Year | Title | Role | Notes |
|---|---|---|---|
| 2016 | So, Then Tell Me | Sue | 2 episodes |
| 2017 | Shelter | Gloria | Unsold pilot |
| 2018 | Dichos | | |
| 2018 | Lethal Weapon | Luisa "The Gute" Gutierrez | 7 episodes |
| 2019 | SMILF | Itsy | 2 episodes |
| 2019 | Wu-Tang: An American Saga | Tonya | Episode: "Assassination Day" |
| 2020–2022 | The Walking Dead | Juanita "Princess" Sanchez | Recurring (Season 10); Main / Also starring (Season 11); Nominated - Imagen Award for Best Supporting Actress: Television (Drama) |
| 2023 | Obliterated | Angela Gomez | 8 episodes |
