= Matarazzo =

Matarazzo (Italian: [mataˈrattso], Neapolitan: [mataˈrattsə]) is an Italian family name from Campania with a small stock present in Sicily, either derived from a place name or originally indicating a mattress maker. Notable people with the surname include:

- Andrea Matarazzo (born 1956), Brazilian industrialist and politician
- Andrew Matarazzo (born 1997), Brazilian-American actor
- Antonello Matarazzo (born 1962), Italian media artist and filmmaker
- Ciccillo Matarazzo (1898–1977), Brazilian industrialist and arts patron
- Daniela Matarazzo Carraro (born 1985), Brazilian Olympic sports shooter
- Eduardo Matarazzo Suplicy (born 1941), Brazilian politician
- Ermelino Matarazzo (1883–1920), Brazilian entrepreneur, namesake of an area of São Paulo:
  - Subprefecture of Ermelino Matarazzo, São Paulo
  - Ermelino Matarazzo (district of São Paulo)
  - Matarazzo Building, the city hall of São Paulo
- Francesco Matarazzo (1443–1518), Italian historian
- Count Francesco Matarazzo (1854–1937), Italian-Brazilian industrialist
  - Indústrias Reunidas Fábricas Matarazzo, Brazilian business group founded by Francesco
- Gaten Matarazzo (born 2002), American actor
- Heather Matarazzo (born 1982), American actress
- Jade Matarazzo (born 1954), Brazilian photographer, great-niece of Ciccillo
- James M. Matarazzo (1941–2018), American academic and librarian
- Jayme Matarazzo (born 1985), Brazilian actor
- John Matarazzo, American musician, composer and producer
- Joseph Matarazzo (1925–2025), American psychologist
- Len Matarazzo (1928–2015), American baseball player
- Lucio Matarazzo, Italian classical guitarist
- Marisa Matarazzo American writer and educator
- Maysa Matarazzo (1936–1977), Brazilian singer
- Mike Matarazzo (1966–2014), American bodybuilder
- Neal Matarazzo (born 1962), American actor
- Norma Abdala de Matarazzo (born 1948), Argentine politician
- Pellegrino Matarazzo (born 1977), American soccer coach
- Raffaello Matarazzo (1909–1966), Italian writer and film director

== See also ==
- 9111 Matarazzo, an asteroid discovered by Giuseppe Matarazzo
- Four Sisters Winery at Matarazzo Farm, a winery in New Jersey
- Matarasso
- Materassi
- Materazzi
