= Narosky =

Narosky is a Slavic surname. Notable people with the name include:

- José Narosky (born 1930), Argentine notary public and writer
- Tito Narosky (born 1932), Argentine ornithologist and writer
