= There Is Many Like Us =

- Directed by: Josh A. Webber
- Written by: Josh A. Webber Zachary Scott (voice overs)
- Produced by: Josh A. Webber
- Starring: Eric Roberts: Tyler Mauro; Kayleigh Gilbert; Michael Girgenti; Zach Silverman; Douglas Bierman; John Antorino; Michael D. Reynolds; Robert Robinson; Gabriella Nejman; Darrin James; Stefanja Orlowska; Keegan Perry
- Cinematography: Ryan Correll Josh A. Webber
- Edited by: Aaron Daniel Annas Josh A. Webber
- Music by: Dave Velez
- Production company: Webstar Productions Constellation Pictures Webber Films
- Release date: 5 May 2015
- Running time: 85 mins
- Countries: Canada, United States, Israel
- Language: English
- Budget: $150,000 (estimated)

There Is Many Like Us is a 2015 documentary film directed by Josh Webber and starring Tyler Mauro, Kayleigh Gilbert, Eric Roberts, Michael Girgenti, Zach Silverman, Stefanja Orlowska, and Douglas Bierman. It is based on the true life story of Max and Rena Fronenberg.

The documentary film follows Max Fronenberg during his forced labor and imprisonment in Pawiak Prison Camp in Warsaw, Poland, during World War II. While imprisoned Max befriends two women who would later become his wives. Max and two friends, Karochic and Goodman, escape by digging a tunnel under the prison camp. Through their courageous actions fifteen prisoners escaped certain death but Fronenburg had to leave the love of his life in the process.

== Plot ==
Set in Poland during the Second World War, this documentary film recounts the experiences of oppression and persecution under German military occupation in the city of Warsaw and the Pawiak Prison Camp. The story follows Max Fronenberg who was put into forced labor at the prison camp, located in the center of the Warsaw ghetto, as a sheet metal worker in 1942. He later met a young woman named Rena Rosenbaum who was concealing her Jewish descent from the Germans and feared she would be discovered and killed. In desperation she managed to get a note to Max revealing her true identity in hopes of getting word to her family if anything were to happen to her. Using his position as a valued worker and some connections he was able to procure within the camp, Max risked his own life to help Rena and others by providing warmer clothes, shoes, boots, and eventually is able to secure her a position sewing clothing, further insulating her from discovery.

From left to right: Michael Girgenti (Karochic), Tyler Mauro (Fronenberg), and Zach Silverman (Goodman)

As increasing numbers of prisoners were being executed and liquidated, Max feared that even his valued labor would not be enough to keep him alive so he devised a plan with two other prisoners to dig a tunnel underneath the camp to the city's sewer system. A difficult and dangerous task, Max and his friends managed to successfully dig this thirty meter tunnel over the course of a year escaping Pawiak and finding refuge through the Jewish Underground. A total of seventeen prisoners escaped, including Max's father.

In July 1944 the Germans liquidated Pawiak, destroying the entire camp, including its records. Max assumed that Rena had died, not knowing that she had indeed survived, having been transferred along with some of the remaining prisoners to the Ravensbrück concentration camp. Later, Max and Rena are re-united by chance after a friend of Max's who had also been imprisoned in Pawiak met her at a train station. Max went to her hometown and they were reunited. However, after being separated after Max was hospitalized for several months after an accident doing a smuggling run, Rena was wed to another man. Heartbroken, Max returned to Warsaw and eventually re-met a young woman named Halina, who was also a prisoner in Pawiak and one of the other women he helped along with Rena. They wed, had two children, and built a life in both Poland and Israel before settling in Montreal, Quebec, Canada in 1953. Several years after Halina's death, Max and Rena are re-united. They wed soon after and spent their remaining years together until Max Fronenberg's death in December 2016

== Cast ==
- Eric Roberts as L.T. Rauder
- Tyler Mauro as Max
- Kayleigh Gilbert as Rena.
- Michael Girgenti as Karochic
- Zach Silverman as Goodman
- Douglas Bierman as Mr. Federman
- John Antorino as Nazi soldier Pilka
- Michael D. Reynolds as Barry
- Robert Robinson as Moses
- Gabriella Nejman as Stella
- Darrin James as Baruch
- Stefanja Orlowska as Halina
- Keegan Perry - General Mishka
- Angie DeGrazia - Beth
- Louis DeStefano - Rahuk
- Jay Flats - Oskar

== Reception ==
The documentary film has received favorable reviews from The Canadian Jewish News and The Jewish Press which called it "a timeless message of love and survival."

== See also ==
- The Holocaust
- War crimes in occupied Poland during World War II
- List of Nazi concentration camps
- Holocaust memorial landscapes in Germany
- Chronicles of Terror
- List of Holocaust films
