= Joseph Baena =

American actor and bodybuilder (born 1997)

- Born: October 2, 1997 (age 29); Burbank, California
- Education: Pepperdine University (BBA)
- Occupations: Film actor; bodybuilder; fitness model; real estate agent
- Years active: 2016–present
- Height: 6 ft 2 in (1.88 m)
- Parents: Arnold Schwarzenegger; Mildred Baena
- Relatives: Gustav Schwarzenegger (grandfather); Katherine Schwarzenegger (half sister); Patrick Schwarzenegger (half brother)

Joseph Baena (born October 2, 1997) is an American actor and fitness model. Joseph Baena is the son of Arnold Schwarzenegger and Mildred Patricia "Patty" Baena.

== Early life ==
Joseph Baena is the son of Arnold Schwarzenegger and Mildred Patricia "Patty" Baena. At birth, he became the legal son of his mother's husband at the time, Rogelio Baena. Rogelio and Patty separated shortly after.

When Baena was 13, he learned that Arnold Schwarzenegger was his biological father, after the media published this news four months after Schwarzenegger's final day as governor of California. This achieved some notoriety in the tabloids, especially when Schwarzenegger admitted to fathering him in an extramarital affair with his former housekeeper—while he was still married to Maria Shriver. Baena decided to keep his last name instead of taking the last name Schwarzenegger.

Baena has one half-sibling from his mother (Jackie Rozo), and four half-siblings from his father: Katherine, Christina, Patrick, and Christopher Schwarzenegger. His paternal half-brother Christopher was born 5 days before Baena, on September 27, 1997.

In 2019, Baena graduated from Pepperdine University in Malibu, California, with a business degree.

== Career ==
=== Fitness modeling ===
Baena was featured on the cover of the Men's Health March 2022 issue, highlighting his fitness practices and his familial bonding with his father. Upon taking up weight lifting, his father gave him the book The Encyclopedia of Modern Bodybuilding, which Schwarzenegger had co-authored, to assist Baena with his training.

In March 2021, Baena started training Brazilian jiu-jitsu at Checkmat Northridge.

=== Realty career ===
Baena expressed an interest in starting a career in real estate on Instagram in May 2021. After taking the necessary classes and passing the state boards, Baena successfully earned his State of California Realtor's License in 2022 and is currently affiliated with Aria Properties in Los Angeles, California.

=== Dancing with the Stars ===
In 2022, Baena was a contestant on the 31st season of Dancing with the Stars where he was paired with Daniella Karagach. They were eliminated 5th and placed 11th in the competition. By competing, "the young Arnold son says that he is not just breaking down the 'dance floor' but is also 'breaking the barriers in his family.'" His body type, flexibility and fitness training were not particularly well adapted to dancing, which he foresaw as a challenge. (Note: After testing as COVID-19 positive, 29-year-old Dancing With the Stars professional dancer Daniella Karagach did not appear with her partner, Joseph Baena. Having been potentially exposed, Baena had to mask up; he and Alexis Warr (a last-minute substitute troupe danceuse) advanced in the competition.)

Baena offered the opinion that physical fitness became his watchword because, "I couldn't keep up with the other guys." In a podcast interview, he confessed that he was both unfit and bullied. In college, he had an epiphany: "I was like the chubby kid in my... crew, and, um yeah. It wasn't until I joined swim my sophomore year..." When he could not run, leaving him unfit for soccer and basketball, he settled on joining the swim team.

=== Amateur bodybuilding ===
On 28 March 2026, Baena competed in the 2026 NPC Natural Colorado State Championships in Men's Classic Physique and Open Bodybuilding. He notably placed 1st in the "True Novice" and "Novice" Classic Physique divisions. He also placed 1st in the "Men's Bodybuilding - Open Heavyweight" division. He came 2nd in Open Class C, making him the runner-up to the overall.

== Filmography ==
=== Film ===
Year	Title	Role	Notes
2016	Terminator 2 Remake with Joseph Baena: Bad to the Bone	The Terminator	Video short
2022	Chariot	Cory	
2022	Bully High	Eddie	
2023	Called to Duty: The Last Airshow	Lt. Andrew 'Bells' Harris	
2024	Gunner	Wally	
TBA	Encounters	Tarrick	Filming
TBA	Lava	Alex	Post-production
TBA	Athena Saves Christmas	TBA	Filming

=== Television ===
Year	Title	Role	Notes
2022	Scam Squad	Nico	Miniseries
2022	Dancing with the Stars	Himself	6 episodes of season 31
2023	Beyond Belief: Fact or Fiction	Robin Hood	Episode: "Ehre unter Dieben"
