= Patrick Schwarzenegger =

American actor (born 1993)

- Schwarzenegger in 2026
- Born: September 18, 1993 (age 33); Santa Monica, California, U.S.
- Citizenship: United States; Austria
- Education: University of Southern California (BBA)
- Occupation: Actor
- Years active: 2006–present
- Spouse: Abby Champion (m. 2025)
- Parent(s): Maria Shriver; Arnold Schwarzenegger
- Relatives: Gustav Schwarzenegger (paternal grandfather); Sargent Shriver (maternal grandfather); Eunice Kennedy Shriver (maternal grandmother); Katherine Schwarzenegger (sister); Joseph Baena (half-brother); Chris Pratt (brother-in-law)
- Family: Shriver; Kennedy

Patrick Arnold Shriver Schwarzenegger (born September 18, 1993) is an American actor. The son of Arnold Schwarzenegger and Maria Shriver, he began his career playing minor roles in the early 2000s, and has since starred in the television series The Staircase (2022), American Sports Story (2024), and the third season of The White Lotus (2025), and Love of Your Life (2026).

== Early life and education ==
Schwarzenegger was born on September 18, 1993, at Providence St John's Health Center in Santa Monica, California, and raised in Los Angeles. He is the eldest son of Austrian-born bodybuilder-turned actor and politician, Arnold Schwarzenegger and journalist Maria Shriver. Schwarzenegger has two older sisters, Katherine and Christina, a younger brother, Christopher, and a younger paternal half-brother, Joseph Baena.

He holds dual Austrian-American citizenship, speaks English and a little German, and regularly visits Austria.

While in high school at Brentwood School, Schwarzenegger took private acting lessons with Nancy Banks. In 2012, he matriculated at the University of Southern California, and in May 2016 received his bachelor's degree from the USC Marshall School of Business, with a major in business administration and a minor in cinematic arts. He was part of the Lambda Chi Alpha fraternity.

== Career ==
=== Acting ===
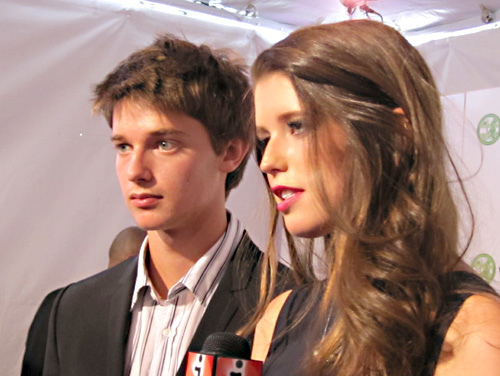
Schwarzenegger and his sister, Katherine, in 2010

At the age of 10, Schwarzenegger had a small role in the film The Benchwarmers. Throughout his childhood, he practiced acting with his father, and through his young adult years, he studied theater at USC while taking acting classes weekly at Nancy Banks Studio. At 15 years old, he started a clothing line.

In the following years, Schwarzenegger had supporting roles in 2012's Stuck in Love, 2013's Grown Ups 2 and 2015's Scouts Guide to the Zombie Apocalypse. His first leading role was opposite Bella Thorne in 2018's Midnight Sun, a romantic drama about a teenage girl with a rare medical condition. He starred in the 2019 horror film Daniel Isn't Real. In 2020, Schwarzenegger had a role in Echo Boomers, then in 2021, he went to star in Netflix's comedy-drama coming-of-age film Moxie.

Schwarzenegger had a role in the 2022 HBO true crime mini-series, The Staircase, alongside Colin Firth and Toni Collette. In 2023, Schwarzenegger had a recurring role in the first season of The Boys spin-off series Gen V on Prime Video, as Luke Riordan / Golden Boy, a young man with superpowers described as "a 22-year-old big name on campus who possesses thermonuclear power and pure charisma." Most recently, Schwarzenegger played the role of Saxon Ratliff in season 3 of The White Lotus.

=== Other ventures ===
In 2011 and 2012, Schwarzenegger interned for Academy Award-nominated producer, John Davis. Schwarzenegger went on to franchise his own Blaze Pizza locations, including one at USC while he was a student there, and one at The Grove in Los Angeles. Schwarzenegger later sold his Blaze Pizza shares and began investing in young entrepreneurs who were creating companies to meet the demand for healthier food and beverage alternatives. Schwarzenegger's other investments include electrolyte drink mix company Liquid I.V., protein coffee brand Super Coffee, and vegan chicken company Nuggs.

In 2020, Schwarzenegger and his mother, who is an advocate for people living with Alzheimer's, created brain nutrition and wellness brand MOSH. The company, whose name stands for Maria Owings Shriver Health, officially launched on World Alzheimer's Day. Jonathan Jarry at the Office for Science and Society pointed out the ingredients used in the MOSH bar do not conclusively improve brain health.

== Personal life ==
Schwarzenegger resides in Los Angeles, California.

Schwarzenegger dated singer Miley Cyrus from 2014 to 2015. Since 2015, he has been in a relationship with model Abby Champion and on December 26, 2023, they announced their engagement. Schwarzenegger and Champion got married at the Gozzer Ranch near Coeur d'Alene, Idaho on September 6, 2025.

== Filmography ==
=== Film ===
Year	Title	Role	Notes
2006	The Benchwarmers	Jock Kid Game No. 3	
2012	Stuck in Love	Glen	
2013	Grown Ups 2	Frat Boy Cooper	
2015	Scouts Guide to the Zombie Apocalypse	Jeff	
2016	Dear Eleanor	Bud	
2017	Go North	Caleb	
2018	Midnight Sun	Charlie Reed	
2019	Daniel Isn't Real	Daniel	
2020	Echo Boomers	Lance	
2021	Moxie	Mitchell Wilson	
2021	Warning	Ben	
2022	Stowaway	Michael	
2025	Billy Knight	TBA	
2026	Bunker	Jeremy Gray	
2026	Love of Your Life	Jason	
2027	Beach Read †	Augustus "Gus" Everett	Filming
TBA	The Bookie & the Bruiser †	Augie / Bernard	Post-production

=== Television ===
Year	Title	Role	Notes
2015	Scream Queens	Thad Radwell	Episode: "Thanksgiving"
2017	The Long Road Home	Ben Hayhurst	Miniseries
2022	The Staircase	Todd Peterson	Miniseries
2022	The Terminal List	Donny Mitchell	3 episodes
2023	Gen V	Luke Riordan / Golden Boy	Recurring role, 5 episodes
2024	Shark Tank	Himself	Presenting Mosh Business
2024	American Sports Story	Tim Tebow	4 episodes
2024	Secret Level	The Kid (voice)	Episode: "Armored Core: Asset Management"
2025	The White Lotus	Saxon Ratliff	Main role; Season 3

=== Music videos ===
Year	Artist	Title	Role	Ref.
2013	Ariana Grande featuring Big Sean	"Right There"	Romeo	
2026	Mr. Fantasy	"Do Me Right"	Himself	
