= Katherine Schwarzenegger =

American writer (born 1989)

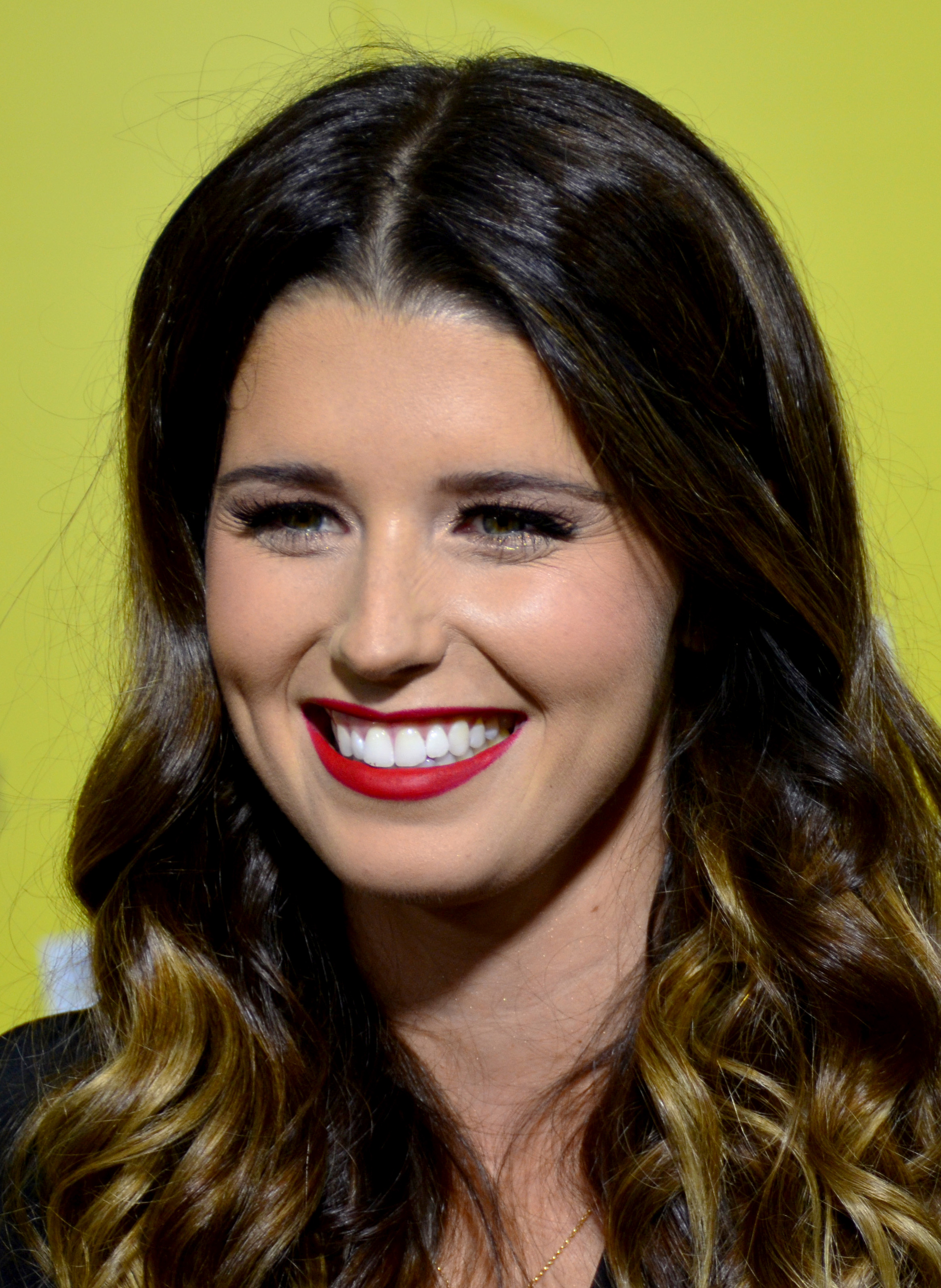
- Schwarzenegger in 2015
- Born: Katherine Eunice Schwarzenegger; December 13, 1989 (age 36); Los Angeles, California, U.S.
- Education: University of Southern California (BA)
- Occupation: Author
- Years active: 2010–present
- Spouse: Chris Pratt (m. 2019)
- Children: 3
- Parents: Arnold Schwarzenegger (father); Maria Shriver (mother)
- Relatives: Gustav Schwarzenegger (paternal grandfather); Sargent Shriver (maternal grandfather); Eunice Kennedy Shriver (maternal grandmother); Patrick Schwarzenegger (brother); Joseph Baena (half-brother); Abby Champion (sister-in-law)
- Family: Shriver; Kennedy
- Website: www.katherineschwarzenegger.com

Katherine Eunice Schwarzenegger Pratt (née Schwarzenegger; born December 13, 1989) is an American author.

== Early life and family ==
Schwarzenegger is the eldest child of Austrian-born American bodybuilder-turned actor and politician, Arnold Schwarzenegger, and American journalist and author, Maria Shriver. In addition to Austrian, she is of Irish and German descent through her maternal grandparents, Eunice and Sargent Shriver. She has a younger sister, Christina, two younger brothers, Patrick and Christopher, and a half-brother, Joseph Baena, through her father.

She graduated from University of Southern California in 2012.

== Career ==
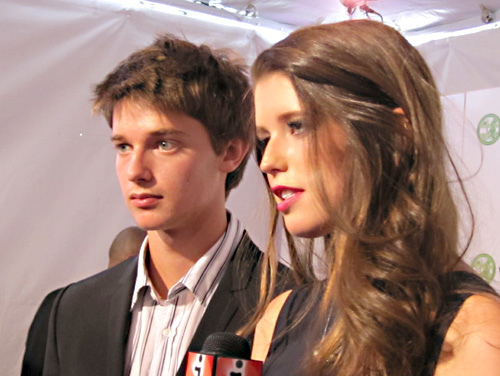
Schwarzenegger and her brother Patrick in 2010

In 2010, Schwarzenegger wrote a book entitled, Rock What You've Got: Secrets to Loving Your Inner and Outer Beauty from Someone Who's Been There and Back. In it, Schwarzenegger describes her personal journey and encourages other young women to achieve confidence and a positive self-image. She had body image issues, between fourth and seventh grade, but now controls her physical and mental health with walking exercises and yoga.

After graduating from college in 2012, Schwarzenegger sought career advice from a variety of people, including athletes, singers, entrepreneurs, and actors. She compiled their wisdom into her second book— I Just Graduated . . . Now What?—which was released in 2014 as a "survival guide" for recent college grads.

In 2017, Schwarzenegger authored a children's book, Maverick and Me. The book tells the story of her rescue and subsequent adoption of her dog, Maverick. Using her own experience as a "foster fail" (when a foster home turns into a "furever" home), the book touts the benefits of pet adoption and rescue. In 2019, she partnered up with Pedigree to host a limited-series podcast discussing the importance of adopting dogs.

The Gift of Forgiveness: Inspiring Stories from Those Who Have Overcome the Unforgivable is Schwarzenegger's latest book, which is a compilation of stories of forgiveness. The book features the stories of 22 people including Elizabeth Smart and Tanya Brown (sister of Nicole Brown-Simpson).

== Personal life ==
Schwarzenegger started dating actor Chris Pratt in 2018. They announced their engagement, in January 2019, and married the following June. They have two daughters and a son. She is also the stepmother to Jack Pratt, the son of Chris Pratt from his earlier marriage to actress Anna Faris.

Schwarzenegger is an American Society for the Prevention of Cruelty to Animals Ambassador and supports the Best Friends Animal Society. She and her husband, Chris Pratt, are also Global Ambassadors for Special Olympics.

== Bibliography ==
- Katherine Schwarzenegger (September 14, 2010). Rock What You've Got: Secrets to Loving Your Inner and Outer Beauty from Someone Who's Been There and Back. Hachette Books. ISBN 978-1-4013-4143-5.
- Katherine Schwarzenegger (April 1, 2014). I Just Graduated ... Now What?: Honest Answers from Those Who Have Been There. Crown Publishing. ISBN 978-0385347204.
- Katherine Schwarzenegger (September 5, 2017). Maverick and Me. Worthy Publishing. ISBN 978-0824956875.
- Katherine Schwarzenegger Pratt (March 10, 2020). The Gift of Forgiveness: Inspiring Stories from Those Who Have Overcome the Unforgivable. Pamela Dorman Books. ISBN 978-1984878250.
- Katherine Schwarzenegger Pratt (February 7, 2023). Good Night, Sister. Penguin Workshop. ISBN 978-0593385814.
