= Materazzi =

Materazzi (pronounced [mateˈrattsi]) is an Italian surname from Arezzo, Perugia and Lazio in central Italy as well as Salerno in southern Italy, either derived from a place name or originally indicating a mattress maker. Notable people with the surname include:

- Daniel Materazzi (born 1985), Portuguese footballer, nicknamed after Marco
- Giuseppe Materazzi (born 1946), Italian football player and manager, Marco's father
- Marco Materazzi (born 1973), Italian football player and manager
- Nicola Materazzi (1939–2022), Italian mechanical engineer
- Riccardo Materazzi (born 1963), Italian middle-distance runner

== See also ==
- Matarazzo
- Matarasso
- Materassi
