= Vanquish (film) =

2021 film by George Gallo

- Release poster
- Directed by: George Gallo
- Screenplay by: George Gallo; Samuel Bartlett
- Story by: Samuel Bartlett
- Produced by: Richard Salvatore; David E. Ornston; Nate Adams
- Starring: Morgan Freeman; Ruby Rose
- Cinematography: Anastos N. Michos
- Edited by: Yvan Gauthier
- Music by: Aldo Shllaku
- Production companies: Grindstone Entertainment Group; Capstone Pictures; Southland Equities LLC; March On Productions; Alla Prima Productions
- Distributed by: Lionsgate
- Release date: April 16, 2021
- Running time: 96 minutes
- Country: United States
- Language: English

Vanquish is a 2021 American action thriller film directed by George Gallo. It stars Morgan Freeman and Ruby Rose.

The film was released in the United States on April 16, 2021, by Lionsgate.

== Plot ==
Retired disabled cop Damon forces Victoria, a former drug courier and his caretaker, to collect bags of money around the city during a single night by holding her daughter Lily hostage. As the night progresses, Victoria finds out that at every stop point she makes, various enemies from her past attack her. Meanwhile, a cop breaks into Damon's home, but Damon kills him.

At her final stop, Victoria is captured and taken to the home of the corrupt Governor. The Governor asks for Victoria's help in taking down Damon, but Victoria refuses and kills the Governor instead.

Upon finally returning to Damon's home, Victoria is reunited with Lily. Then Damon explains that he had no need for the money that Victoria had collected; instead, this night was a part of his plan to eliminate all of Victoria's enemies along with the corrupt Governor, thus cleaning the city of crime and corruption.

As the dawn breaks, Damon lures all the corrupted cops that had been working for the Governor into his home, where he blows himself up along with them. Meanwhile, Victoria and Lily escape safely.

== Cast ==
- Ruby Rose as Victoria Vicky
- Morgan Freeman as Damon
- Nick Vallelonga as Det. Stevens
- Miles Doleac as Erik
- Patrick Muldoon as Agent Monroe
- Joel Michaely as Rayo
- Juju Journey Brener as Lily
- Julie Lott as Governor Ann Driscoll
- Hannah Stocking as Galyna

== Production ==
Principal photography occurred in September 2020 in Biloxi, Mississippi. Filming wrapped in January 2021.

== Release ==
Vanquish was released in select theaters starting from April 16, 2021, as well as on-demand and digital on April 23 and on DVD and Blu-ray on April 27.

=== Critical response ===
Review aggregator website Rotten Tomatoes reported that 5% of 63 critics gave the film a positive review, with an average rating of 3.20/10. Metacritic assigned the film a weighted average score of 22 out of 100 based on 14 critics, indicating "generally unfavorable" reviews.

Writing for RogerEbert.com, Peter Sobczynski described the film as “a rehash of genre cliches that is so dull, threadbare, and bereft of thrills that the one time that its one moment of genuine excitement comes when our heroine enters a bar where danger is allegedly afoot, and the television in the background is showing curling” and “the kind [of film] that almost makes the DTV drivel that Steven Seagal has been churning out for the last couple of decades seem focused and committed by comparison”, rating it only one out of four stars.

=== Accolades ===
| Year | Award | Category | Recipient | Result | Ref. |
|---|---|---|---|---|---|
| 2022 | Golden Raspberry Awards | Worst Actress | Ruby Rose | Nominated | |
