= Acting for a Cause =

American live read series for charity (2020)

Acting for a Cause Live Readings
- Show type: Staged reading

Creative team
- Creator: Brando Crawford
- Director: Brando Crawford
- Host: Brando Crawford
- Official website

Acting for a Cause is a live read series of classic plays and screenplays created, produced, directed and hosted by Brando Crawford. The script is typically announced days before the event, alongside a playbill featuring the cast and an animation on Instagram. The actors have one rehearsal ahead of time. Each reading is organized to raise money for charity. The readings garnered over 500,000 viewers between the first play read on March 27, 2020 and the last announced read on July 31, 2020.

The series has featured young Hollywood actors such as Florence Pugh, Margaret Qualley, Melissa Barrera, Ruby Rose, Madelaine Petsch, Zazie Beetz, David Corenswet, Jacob Elordi, Natalia Dyer, Corbin Bleu, Julia Fox, Tommy Dorfman, Madeline Brewer, Sophia Lillis, Wyatt Oleff and Cameron Monaghan. Recurring participants include Auliʻi Cravalho, Brandon Flynn, Justice Smith, Alex Wolff, Ronen Rubinstein, Jessica Frances Dukes, Mason Alexander Park, Sydney Lemmon and Xxavier Lavell. While Brando Crawford serves as director and producer for every reading. Alex Wolff co-produced the reading of This is our Youth and Xxavier Lavell co-directed the reading of Hit the Wall.

The reading series was a direct response to the COVID-19 pandemic in the United States.

== Readings ==
Brando Crawford directs and reads the stage directions unless otherwise noted. Many of the actors play multiple supporting roles. Specific roles are stated only when information is known.

=== 2020 ===
==== March 27, 2020 ====
The Importance of Being Earnest by Oscar Wilde

Directed and produced by Brando Crawford

- Justice Smith as Jack
- Alex Wolff as Algernon
- Auliʻi Cravalho as Gwendolen
- Jessica Frances Dukes as Cecily
- Sarah Ramos as Lady Bracknell
- Odessa Young as Lady Prism
- Jessica Carlson as Lane
- Brando Crawford as the Master of Ceremonies

Note: This cast originally included Diana Silvers but she was unavailable at the last minute.

==== April 10, 2020 ====
This Is Our Youth by Kenneth Lonergan

Directed and produced by Brando Crawford, co-produced by Alex Wolff

- Florence Pugh as Jessica Goldman
- Justice Smith as Dennis Ziegler
- Alex Wolff as Warren Straub
- Brando Crawford as the Master of Ceremonies

==== April 24, 2020 ====
Hamlet by William Shakespeare

Directed and produced by Brando Crawford

- Willa Fitzgerald as Hamlet
- Brandon Flynn as Ophelia
- Madeline Brewer as Claudius
- Hari Nef as Polonius
- Auliʻi Cravalho as Laertes
- Ronen Rubinstein as Horatio
- Mason Alexander Park as Rosencrantz
- Christopher Collins as Guildenstern
- Chandler Lovelle as King Hamlet's Ghost
- Brando Crawford as Queen Gertrude and the Master of Ceremonies

==== May 1, 2020 ====
Romeo and Juliet by William Shakespeare

Directed and produced by Brando Crawford

- Margaret Qualley as Juliet
- David Corenswet as Romeo
- Brandon Flynn as Mercutio
- Skylar Astin as The Prince
- Michael Gandolfini as Benvolio
- Jackie Cruz as Lady Capulet
- Kathryn Gallagher as Friar Lawrence
- Erin Sanders as Nurse
- Samuel H. Levine as Tybalt
- Will Hochman as Lord Montague
- Brando Crawford as Lord Capulet and the Master of Ceremonies

==== May 8, 2020 ====
Pride and Prejudice by Jane Austen

Directed and produced by Brando Crawford

- Melissa Barrera as Elizabeth Bennet
- Jacob Elordi as Mr. Darcy
- Madelaine Petsch as Jane Bennet
- Sam Corlett as Mr. Bingley
- Sydney Lemmon as Mrs. Bennet
- Andy Allo as Kitty Bennet, Caroline Bingley
- Katherine McNamara as Lydia Bennet
- Lexi Underwood as Mary Bennet
- Ronen Rubinstein as Mr. Collins
- Daniel Newman as Mr. Wickham
- Auliʻi Cravalho as Lady Catherine
- Matthew Postlethwaite as Sir William
- Brando Crawford as Mr. Bennet and Master of Ceremonies

==== May 15, 2020 ====
Jane Eyre by Charlotte Brontë

Directed and produced by Brando Crawford

- Natalia Dyer as Jane Eyre
- Alexander Hodge as Mr. Edward Rochester
- Sophia Lillis as Helen Burns
- Elle Loraine as Mrs. Fairfax
- Sydney Lemmon as Bertha
- Richard Ellis as St. John Rivers
- Jessica Frances Dukes as Mrs. Reed
- Rudy Pankow as Brocklehurst
- Brando Crawford as the Master of Ceremonies

==== May 22, 2020 ====
Twelfth Night by William Shakespeare

Directed and produced by Brando Crawford

- Ruby Rose as Viola
- Brandon Thomas Lee as Duke Orsino
- Taylor Trensch as Sebastian
- Froy Gutierrez as Sir Andrew Aguecheek
- Ben Levi Ross as Feste
- Will Roland as Malvolio
- Maitreyi Ramakrishnan as Olivia
- Nicole Kang as Maria
- Brando Crawford as Sir Toby Belch and the Master of Ceremonies

==== June 23, 2020 ====
Hit the Wall by Ike Holter

Directed and produced by Brando Crawford

- Ryan Jamaal Swain as A-Gay
- Angel Bismark Curiel as Newbie
- Daniel Kyri as Mika
- Eve Lindley as Peg
- Clark Moore as Cliff
- Dilone as Roberta
- Jan Luis Castellanos as Tano
- Travis Bryant as Carson
- Imani Hakim as Madeline
- Xxavier Lavell as Narrator and Co-Director
- Brando Crawford as the Cop and the Master of Ceremonies

==== June 30, 2020 ====
Up in the Air by Jason Reitman and Sheldon Turner

Directed and produced by Brando Crawford

- Zazie Beetz as Natalie Keener (originally played by Anna Kendrick)
- Pom Klementieff as Alex Goran (originally played by Vera Farmiga)
- Michael Zegen as Ryan Bingham (originally played by George Clooney)
- Corbin Bleu as Craig Gregory (originally played by Jason Bateman)
- Jessica Parker Kennedy as Kara Bingham (originally played by Amy Morton)
- Benjamin Barrett as Jim Miller (originally played by Danny McBride) and Steve (originally played by Zach Galifianakis)
- Mason Alexander Park as Bob (originally played by J. K. Simmons) and Maynard Finch (originally played by Sam Elliott)
- Zoey Burger as Julie Bingham (originally played by Melanie Lynskey)
- Brando Crawford as Master of Ceremonies

==== July 7, 2020 ====
Ferris Bueller's Day Off by John Hughes

Directed and produced by Brando Crawford

- Cameron Monaghan as Ferris Bueller (originally played by Matthew Broderick)
- Brando Crawford as Cameron Frye (originally played by Alan Ruck) and as Boy in Police Station (originally played Charlie Sheen)
- Emeraude Toubia as Sloane Peterson (originally played by Mia Sara)
- Charlie Weber as Rooney (originally played by Jeffrey Jones) and as Economics Teacher (originally played by Ben Stein)
- Auliʻi Cravalho as Jeannie Bueller (originally played by Jennifer Grey)
- Jeanine Mason as Grace (originally played by Edie McClurg)
- Xxavier Lavell as Narrator

Note: This cast originally included Kelvin Harrison Jr. but he was unavailable at the last minute.

==== July 31, 2020 ====
A Midsummer Night's Dream by William Shakespeare

Directed and produced by Brando Crawford

- Brando Crawford as Bottom the Weaver, Egeus, and Master of Ceremonies
- Tommy Dorfman as Puck (also plays Quince – this script has them being the same person; as if Puck has disguised himself as Quince entirely)
- Julia Fox as Hippolyta (also plays Titania)
- Andrew Matarazzo as Theseus (also plays Oberon)
- Erinn Westbrook as Hermia
- Pauline Chalamet as Helena
- Drew Starkey as Demetrius
- Wyatt Oleff as Lysander
- Lauren McCrostie as Mustardseed/Snug/Lion
- Paris De Chantal Smith as Cobweb/Starveling/Moon and Philostrate
- Alyssa Jirrels as Narrator/Snout/Wall
- Ashleigh Morghan as Peaseblossom/Flute/Thisbe

== Other events ==
On June 5, 2020, Brando Crawford, Xxavier Lavell and Daniel Wilson uploaded the Black Lives Matter Manifesto on Acting for a Cause's YouTube channel unannounced, in place of a reading.

In 2023, Crawford directed a greenscreen-based remake of Tommy Wiseau's 2003 cult favorite The Room, starring Bob Odenkirk, Bella Heathcote, Cameron Kasky, Mike Flanagan, Kate Siegel, Arturo Castro and original star Greg Sestero. The film was theatrically released in October 2025.
