= Stowaway (2022 film) =

- Directed by: Declan Whitebloom
- Written by: Ian Hayden
- Starring: Ruby Rose; Frank Grillo; Patrick Schwarzenegger
- Distributed by: AMC+
- Release date: August 5, 2022
- Running time: 94 minutes
- Country: United States
- Language: English

Stowaway is a 2022 American thriller film written by Ian Hayden, directed by Declan Whitebloom and starring Ruby Rose, Frank Grillo and Patrick Schwarzenegger. It is Whitebloom's feature directorial debut.

== Plot ==
Bella inherits a yacht from her father, who was a mercenary. She wants to take a trip on it with her boyfriend Michael, but the yacht is attacked by Meeser, a colleague of her father's, who wants to get his hands on money they stole together. Michael escapes to get help. Meanwhile, Bella learns from Captain Lawson that her father donated the money to charitable organizations. Meeser murders him, Bella escapes from the ship, detonates an explosive device, and is rescued by the coast guard, alerted by Michael. Bella then donates a share of the insurance money from the yacht to Captain Lawson's widow.

== Cast ==
- Ruby Rose as Bella Denton
- Patrick Schwarzenegger as Michael
- Frank Grillo as Meeser
- Scotty Bohnen as Sunshine
- Danny Bohnen as Jim
- Luis Da Silva as Captain Lawson
- Major Dodge as Arthur Denton

== Release ==
The film was released on AMC+ on August 5, 2022.

== Reception ==
Alistair Lawrence of Common Sense Media awarded the film two stars out of five.

Brittany Witherspoon of Screen Rant also awarded the film two stars out of five.
