= Tito Narosky =

Argentinian ornithologist and writer

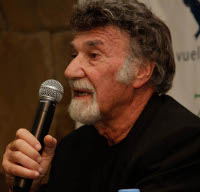

Personal details
- Born: June 6, 1932 (age 94) Lanús, Buenos Aires, Argentina

Tito (Samuel) Narosky (born June 6, 1932) is an Argentine ornithologist and writer. Of the 20 books he has authored or co-authored, Birds of Argentina and Uruguay, a Field Guide is the best known, with over 40,000 copies sold.

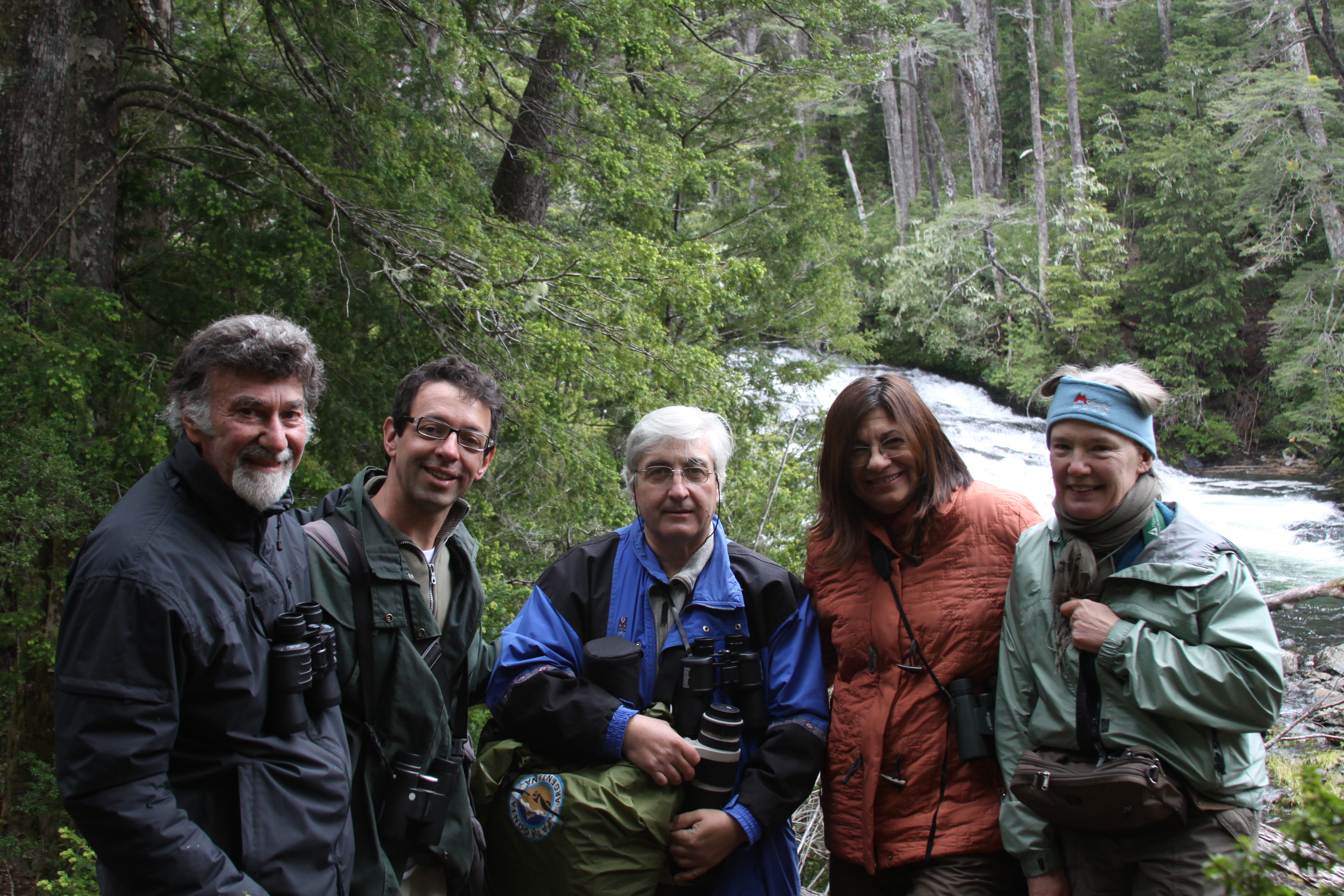
Birding in Patagonia. With Horacio Matarasso and a group.

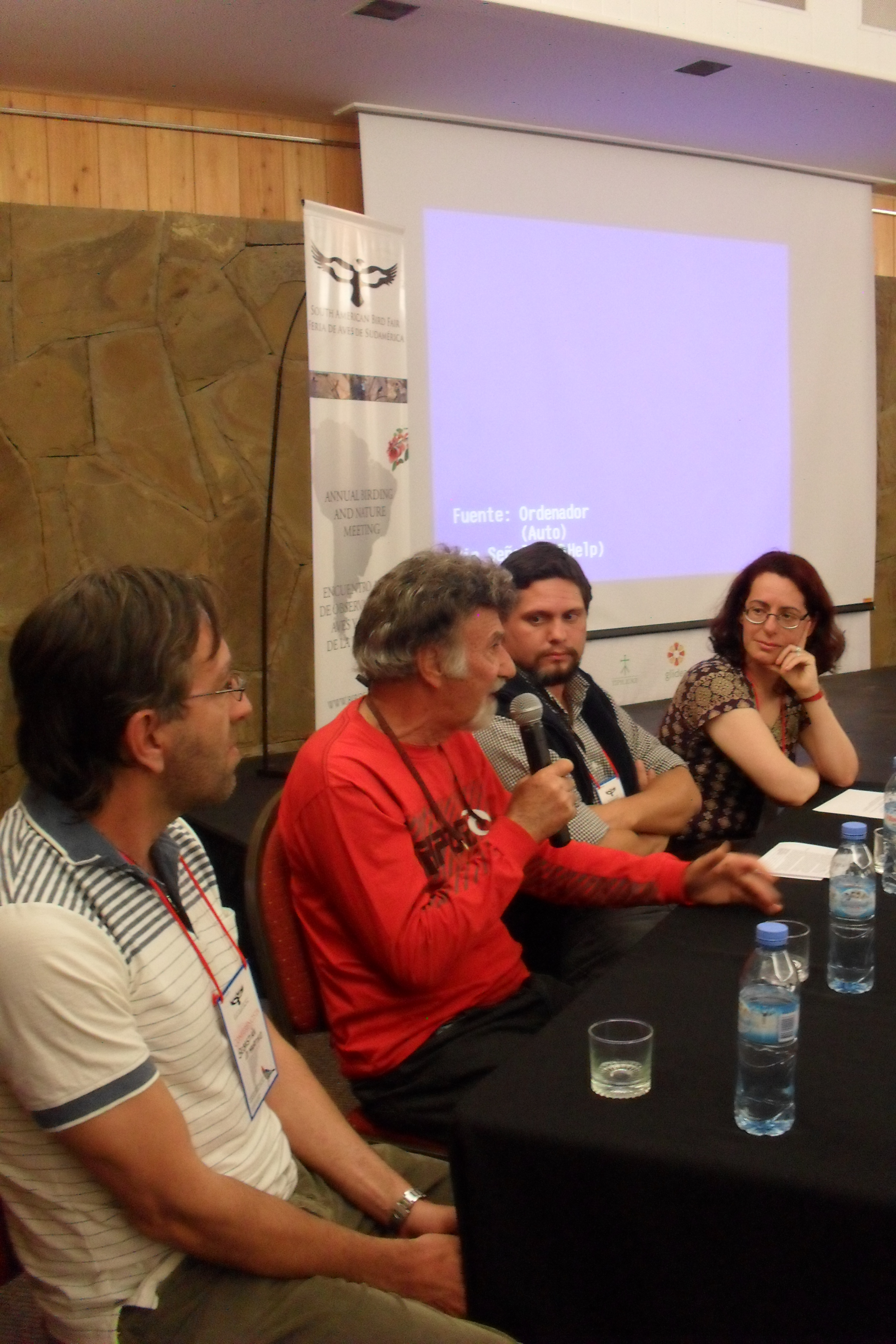
Narosky in a symposium during the South American Bird Fair 2010

Narosky has studied and observed wild birds for more than 50 years, having made over 200 field trips and published hundreds of scientific papers and articles. He is closely associated with Aves Argentinas, the Argentine partner of BirdLife International since 1967, of which he is honorary president. He conducted their first birdwatching courses, edited the journal El Hornero and created the Argentinian Naturalist School. He added five new bird species for the country and one new to science: the white-collared seedeater, as well as records of previously unknown nests. In 2010 he presented the 16° edition of his classical Field Guide and the official Checklist of the Birds of Argentina (with Horacio Matarasso). He is president of the Scientific Assessor Committee of the South American Bird Fair

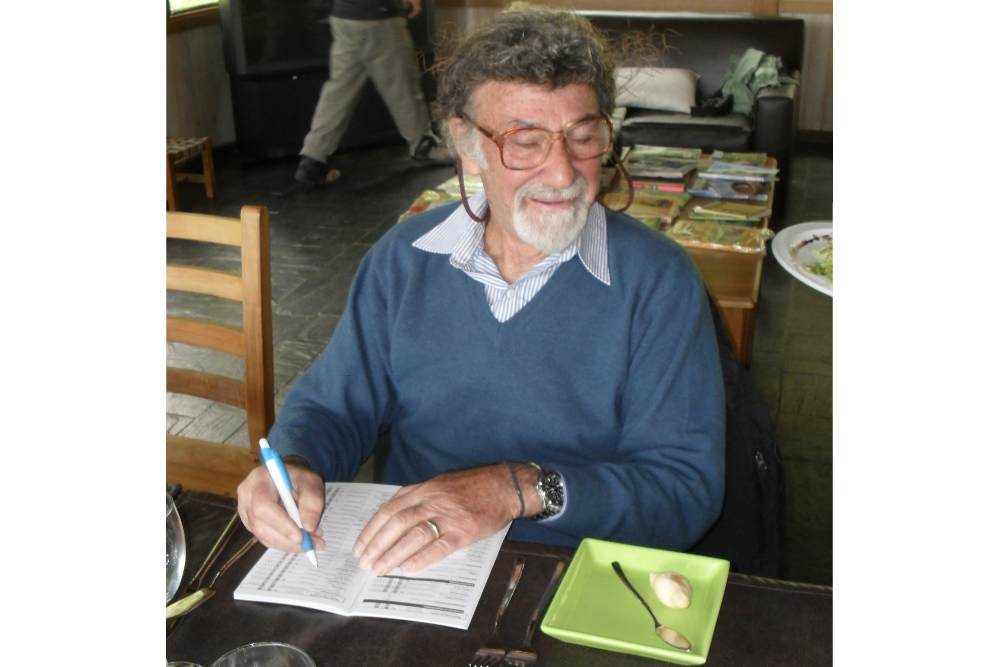
Writing the official "Checklist of the Birds of Argentina", 2010
