= Horacio Matarasso =

Argentine ornithologist (born 1967)

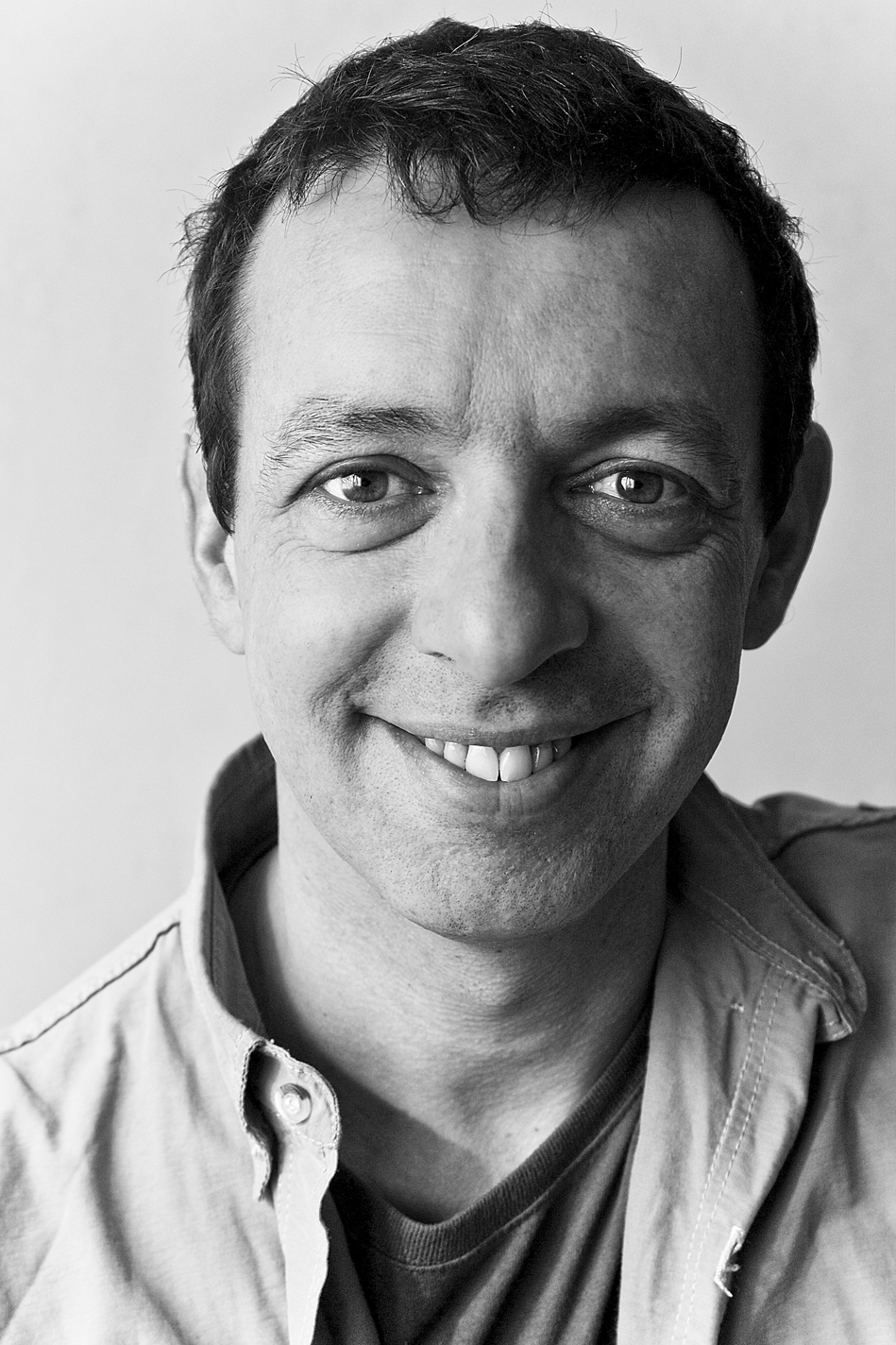
- Born: January 6, 1967 (age 59); Buenos Aires, Argentina
- Occupation: Ornithologist

Horacio Matarasso (born January 6, 1967) is an Argentine ornithologist and leader of South American bird watchers.

== Biography ==
Born in Buenos Aires in 1967, where he lived until 1995. He joined Aves Argentinas in 1984 and studied Biology at the University of Buenos Aires, specialized in Ornithology. He is currently member of the team of Ibera Birding Lodge, consultor of Fundación Humedales, representative of Wetlands International in Argentina, and director of Buenos Dias Birding and make trips to study birds in Argentina, Chile, Peru, Brazil and other countries of the continent.

== Contributions to birdwatching ==
From 1996 to 2014, he lived in northern Patagonia, where was director of the Centre for Ornithology Neuquén from Universidad Nacional del Comahue. He has made several contributions to the Ornithology, including the discovery of 2 new species for Argentina: The Tenca (Mimus thenca) and the Slender-billed Parakeet Enicognathus leptorhynchus

Since 1996 dictates Birding courses in different locations in Argentina and Chile. He has participated as an honorary advisor of national and provincial governments, representing the country in meetings held in other continents (USA, England, etc.). In 2008, he chaired the XII Argentina Ornithological Meeting. In 2010, along with Tito Narosky wrote the Checklist of Birds of Argentina.

His biggest contribution, however, could be the impact on bird watching in South America. From 2008, he has worked on the development and integration of birding in South America and is currently the Chairman of the Organizing Committee of the South American Bird Fair, the main point of contact between the birders across the continent.

== News ==
- Diario Andino
- Website del Gobierno Argentino
- Government Press gobierno del Neuquén
- La Voz de los Andes webnews
