= Footscray High School =

Coordinates: 37°47′57″S 144°53′35″E

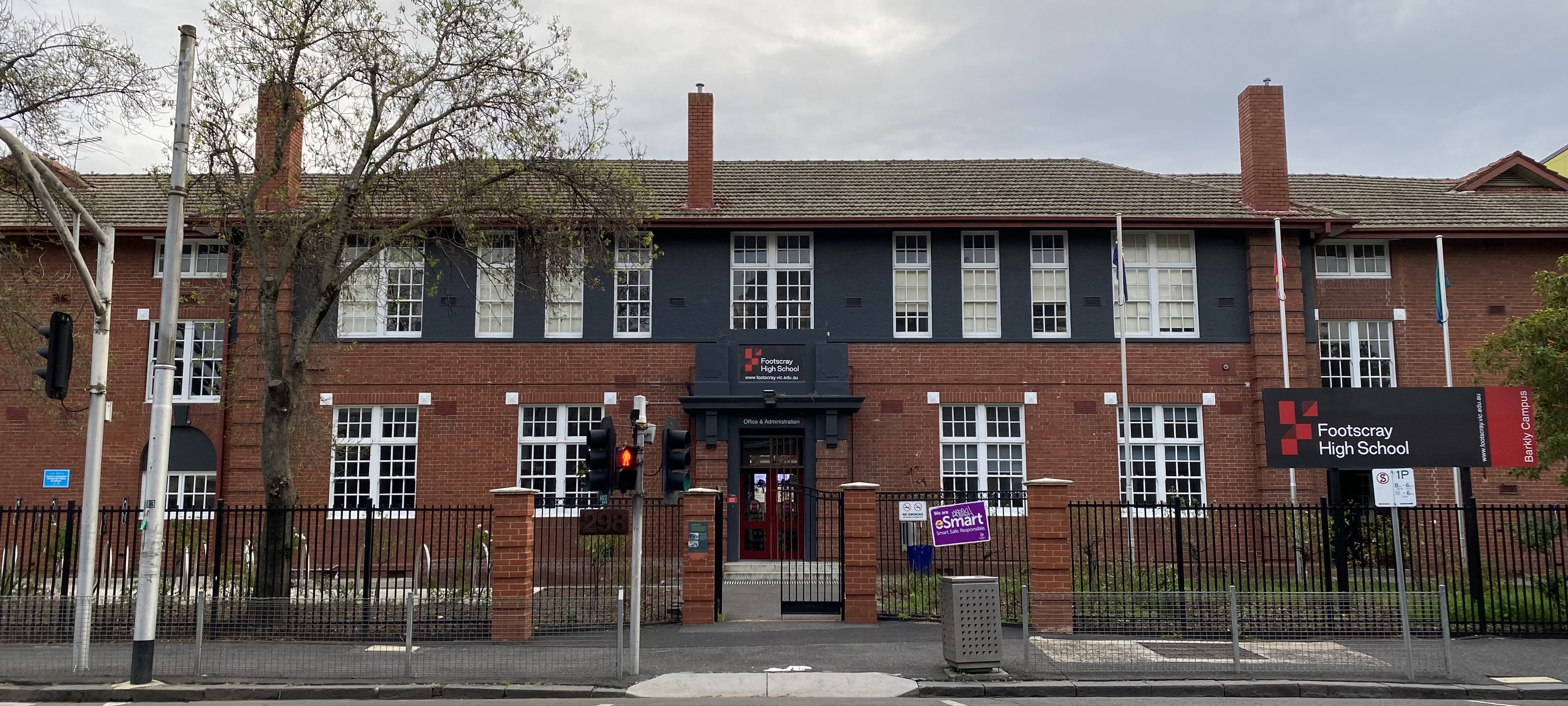
- Main building of the 7-9 Barkly campus
- Footscray, VIC, 3011; Australia

Information
- Type: Government (public)
- Motto: "Tomorrow, Together"
- Religious affiliation: None
- Established: 1916
- School district: Maribyrnong
- Principal: Piper Davis
- Grades: 7 to 12
- Enrollment: Approximately 1400
- Campus size: Barkly: 16,442 sq.m; Pilgrim: 6,121 sq.m; Kinnear: 23,146 sq.m
- Campus type: Urban
- Colors: Black, grey, red
- Athletics: Rowing
- Mascot: Barkly the dog Michael Antony
- Campus principals: Piper Davis, Barkly Campus; Maria Chrisant, Pilgrim Campus; Vicki Tentzoglidis, Kinnear Campus
- Specialty: Science, Technology and Mathematics
- Website: Official website

Footscray High School is a multi-campus secondary school in Melbourne, Australia. It consists of two junior, years 7-9, campuses (Barkly and Pilgrim) and a newly renovated senior, years 10-12 campus (Kinnear).

Footscray High School is part of the Footscray Learning Precinct and has formed a network with the University of Melbourne which gives students a better chance of getting into the university after they leave high school. The network provides opportunities for Footscray High School to enter into a structured program that focuses upon excellence in teaching and learning practice and the improvement of student learning outcomes.

== History ==
In March 1916, the Footscray Technical School began teaching at what is now Victoria University's Footscray Nicholson campus. In July 1958, the school was renamed "Footscray Technical College" in line with Education Department reforms to technical schools at that time. On 25 September 1968, it was renamed "Footscray Institute of Technology" (FIT).

On 1 July 1972, the secondary education part of the institute was separated and named "Footscray Secondary Technical School". It continued to operate on the Nicholson Street site. However, its council was not established until early 1975, and a new site (on Ballarat Rd) was not acquired until 1975 and was not ready for occupation until May 1980. Thus during this period it remained closely linked to the institute.

== Notable students ==
- Dan Sultan, musician
- Ruby Rose, actress
