= Dog Patrol =

- Directed by: Josh Webber
- Written by: Josh Webber; Greg Crowder
- Produced by: Josh Webber; Tony Mercedes; Henry Penzi; Christina Cooper; Shauna D. Balfour
- Starring: Paxton Kubitz; Kylie Marshall; Santiago Ramirez; Cuba Gooding Jr.
- Music by: Randy Edelman
- Production company: Webber Films
- Country: Canada
- Language: English

Dog Patrol is an upcoming Canadian adventure film written by Josh Webber and Greg Crowder, directed by Webber, and starring Paxton Kubitz, Kylie Marshall, Santiago Ramirez and Cuba Gooding Jr.

== Cast ==
- Cuba Gooding Jr. as Sheriff Jacobs
- Tony Mercedes as Lawrence
- The Wicker Twinz as The Twins
- Paxton Kubitz as Samuel
- Kylie Marshall as Vanessa
- Santiago Ramirez as Alphonso
- Robert Miano as Don Amici
- Richard Portnow as Oscar Golden
- Mars Callahan as Agent Matters
- Glenn Plummer as Agent Yorn
- Kaitlyn Raymond as Kathy
- Joseph Baena as Thomas
- Ludovica Frasca as Francesca
- Ahmed Alabdi as Jail Inmate
- Jarvis Redd
- Ryanne Parker as Press Photographer
- Chris Camaj as Franky Amicci

== Production ==
On March 3, 2023, it was announced that Gooding Jr., Mercedes, Kubitz, Marshall, Ramirez, Miano, Portnow, Callahan, Plummer and Raymond were cast in the film. On March 31, 2023, it was announced that Baena and Frasca were added to the cast and that filming occurred in Lake Arrowhead, California. Randy Edelman was announced as the film's composer.

In late 2024, the release date was announced to be on September 20, 2025, and the film was renamed to Dog Patrol, previously Athena Saves Christmas.
