= Ruby Rose =

Australian actress and model (born 1986)

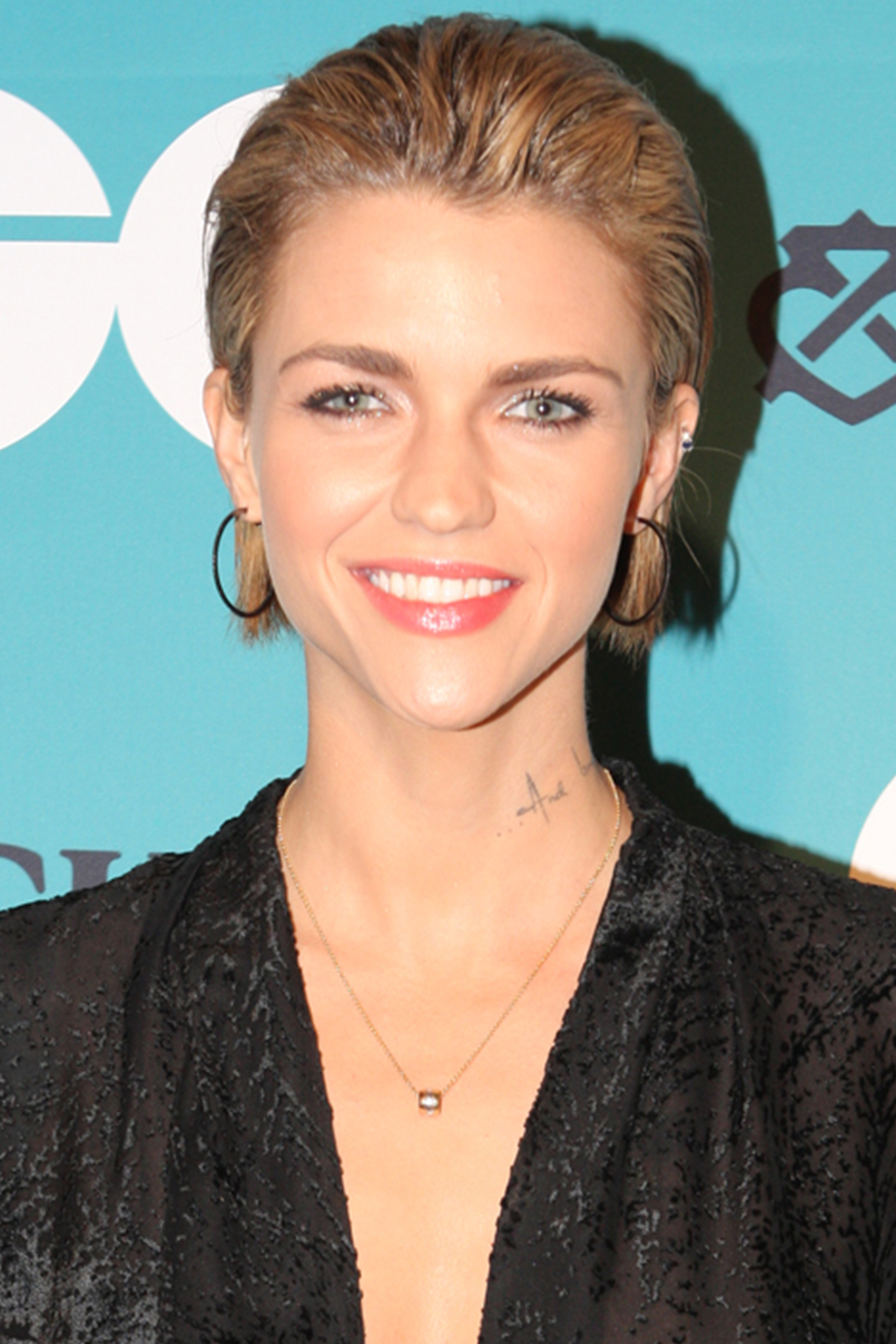
- Rose in 2012
- Born: Ruby Rose Langenheim; 20 March 1986 (age 40); Melbourne, Victoria, Australia
- Occupations: Actress; model; presenter; DJ; fashion designer
- Years active: 1998–present
- Relatives: Alec Campbell (great-grandfather); Ellen Bang (great-grandmother)

Ruby Rose Langenheim (born 20 March 1986) is an Australian actress, television presenter, and model. She gained prominence for her role in season three of the Netflix series Orange Is the New Black (2015–2016) and for portraying Kate Kane / Batwoman in the Arrowverse television franchise, including season one of the series Batwoman (2019–2020).

As a presenter, Rose hosted MTV Australia (2007–2011), before taking on several high-profile modelling gigs, including working with Maybelline in Australia. She also co-hosted various television shows, such as Australia's Next Top Model (2009) and The Project (2009–2011).

Rose made her film debut with a small role in Around the Block (2013). She later appeared in action films such as Resident Evil: The Final Chapter (2016), XXX: Return of Xander Cage (2017), and John Wick: Chapter 2 (2017). Rose also co-starred in the musical comedy Pitch Perfect 3 (2017) and the monster film The Meg (2018).

== Early life ==
Ruby Rose Langenheim was born in Melbourne on 20 March 1986, the daughter of 20-year-old single mother Katia Langenheim. She is the great-granddaughter of German actress Ellen Bang (1906–1981) and Australian soldier Alec Campbell (1899–2002), who became known as the last Australian survivor of the Battle of Gallipoli and lived to the age of 103. As a young child, she travelled frequently, living in rural Victoria, Tasmania, and Surfers Paradise before finally settling back in Melbourne. She attended University High School and Footscray City College.

== Career ==
=== Modelling and fashion ===
Rose first joined the Girlfriend model search in 2002, for which she came in second to Catherine McNeil. She has featured predominantly within mainstream fashion titles, including Vogue Australia, InStyle, Marie Claire, Cleo, Cosmopolitan, Maxim, Nylon and New York's Inked. She's been the Australian ambassador for JVC, Australian clothes company JAG, and luxury Danish label Georg Jensen. Rose is also the face of Maybelline in Australia, and since March 2016 has also been the face of Urban Decay.

In 2010, Rose collaborated with the Australian fashion label Milk and Honey to design a capsule fashion line. The collection, named Milk and Honey Designed by Ruby Rose, includes washed jeans, leather jackets and T-shirts. The clothing line was available in selected retailers in Australia. Rose also released a collaboration collection with street footwear brand Gallaz. In 2014, Rose began collaborating with Phoebe Dahl for their clothing range Faircloth Lane. In March 2017, Rose starred in Nike's latest campaign "Kiss My Airs" celebrating its Air Max Day. In May, Rose was the face of Swarovski 'Urban Fantasy' FW17 Collection launch.

=== VJ career and television personality ===
In order to land the job as a MTV VJ in Australia, Rose competed against 2000 other hopefuls in a three-week national search, as former VJ Lyndsey Rodrigues moved to the United States to co-host TRL. As part of the competition, she downed 100 shots of beer in 100 minutes against Jackass's Bam Margera, and kissed strangers on a busy Sydney street. She stated, "Being a model there is always something they want to change. Whether they want someone a little bit skinnier, a little bit taller, a little bit prettier, but MTV wants you to be yourself... not censoring anything and not conforming to anything."

In 2009, Rose won the ASTRA Award for Favourite Female Personality. She also travelled to Kenya to "highlight... [the] amazing work" done by Global Vision International. She appeared in the episode "Media Virgins", of season 5 of Australia's Next Top Model, acting as a guest judge, and also worked as a correspondent for the finale of the same show.

In July 2009, Rose along with Dave Hughes, Charlie Pickering, Carrie Bickmore and James Mathison hosted The 7pm Project, an Australian television news talk show produced by Roving Enterprises which aired weeknights on Network 10. She left the program to pursue her own hosting projects. In October 2009, it was announced that Fox8 had picked up the rights to UK format Ultimate School Musical, which features ordinary teenagers from a school attempting to put on a music production to a professional standard in just six weeks. The Australian version was produced by FremantleMedia Australia with Rose as host, and aired in 2010. Rose also hosted the Foxtel Mardi Gras for 3 consecutive years before becoming an official correspondent for Foxtel for the 2010 Winter Olympics. In October 2015, Rose hosted the 2015 MTV Europe Music Awards alongside Ed Sheeran in Milan.

=== Acting career ===
==== 2008–2014: Early work ====
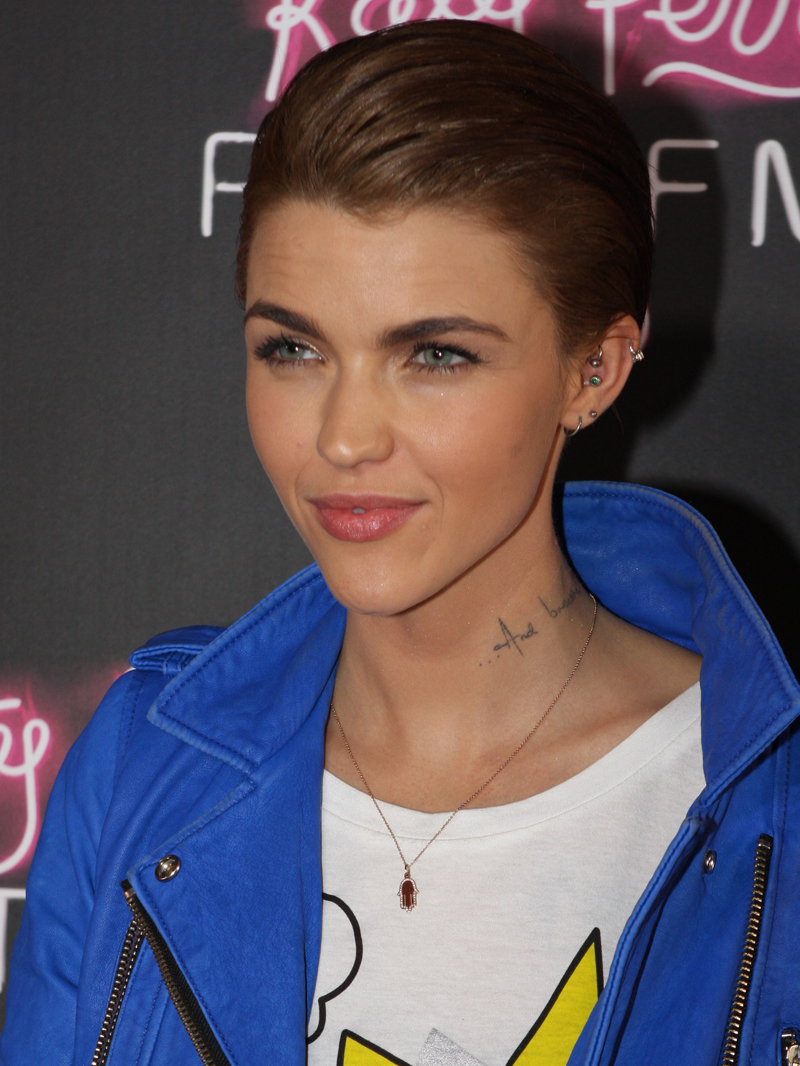
Rose in 2012

Rose was selected in 2008 to act in the Australian comedy film Suite for Fleur. In 2009, she appeared on the first episode of Talkin' 'Bout Your Gen, representing Gen M alongside comedian Josh Thomas. She also appeared alongside Christina Ricci and Jack Thompson in the 2013 film Around the Block.

Rose credits her 2014 short film Break Free, which she produced herself, for the success of her acting career. In an interview with Variety, she described how she was not able to get a manager, agent, or audition; so she decided to create short films "as a way of being able to give myself something to do and to study my craft." The film went viral, getting millions of views in a short period of time.

==== 2015–2018: Orange is the New Black and film stardom ====
In 2015, Rose joined the Orange Is the New Black cast in season 3. Rose played inmate Stella Carlin, "whose sarcastic sense of humour and captivating looks quickly draw the attention of some of Litchfield's inmates." Rose's performance was generally well received by the public and is considered to be her breakthrough role. She was also cast in a guest role, as the service robot Wendy, in the science fiction series Dark Matter.

In 2017, Rose appeared in three action film sequels: XXX: Return of Xander Cage alongside Vin Diesel, Resident Evil: The Final Chapter alongside Milla Jovovich, and John Wick: Chapter 2 alongside Keanu Reeves. She also played a musical rival in the comedy Pitch Perfect 3, which was released in December of that same year. Rose co-starred in the Warner Bros. film The Meg, a shark epic based on the novel of the same name, alongside Jason Statham; the film was released on 10 August 2018.

==== 2019–2020: Batwoman and departure ====
On 7 August 2018, it was reported that Rose had been cast as Batwoman in an Arrowverse crossover. Her role as Kate Kane has been noted as the first openly lesbian lead superhero in television. Batwoman aired on The CW on 6 October 2019. Rose's casting as Batwoman was met by backlash and criticism on social media. DC Comics, which owns the rights to Batwoman, reintroduced the character in 2006 as a lesbian of Jewish descent. Some online commentators criticised Rose for not being Jewish, while the main focus of the scrutiny was the assertion that the fact she identifies as genderfluid made her "not gay enough" for the role. Rose quit Twitter and deactivated public commenting on her Instagram account following the backlash. Prior to leaving Twitter, she released a tweet responding to the negative reaction, stating, "Where on earth did 'Ruby is not a lesbian therefore she can't be batwoman' come from — has to be the funniest most ridiculous thing I've ever read." Rose called for unity between women and minorities, imploring women and the LGBTQ community to be kinder and more supportive of each other.

In Entertainment Weekly's 2019 LGBTQ special issue, Rose additionally discussed the backlash to her casting as the title character of the television series Batwoman. She said the opportunity to audition for Orange is the New Black came about because the show wanted to have a gender-neutral character, but that she has also received criticism because of her genderfluid identity, adding, "when I got cast as a lesbian in Batwoman, I didn't know that being a gender-fluid woman meant that I couldn't be a lesbian because I'm not a woman - not considered lesbian enough." She said that while her initial response was dismissive, she later considered if there was a way to remedy the situation so that others would not be offended by her identity, and pondered making up a term that does not offend people and would indicate that she is "fluid in (her) gender, but also a lesbian."

On 19 May 2020, Rose departed Batwoman after the first season, and initially gave no definitive reason behind her departure. Her character was subsequently written out of the series and replaced with a new one named Ryan Wilder, portrayed by Javicia Leslie. Rose later said she suffered an injury during the production of the first season. In August 2020, she called being the lead of a series "taxing" and stated her back surgery following the injury was a contributing factor in deciding to leave. In a March 2021 interview with ComicBookMovie.com, when asked if she would reprise Kate at some point, Rose said, "I would totally do it. I don't think it would serve the story because I think building the new Batwoman is more important than going back too far into Kate Kane, but of course I would." She added, "I've watched a couple of episodes, and I think how they're handling it is beautiful. I think it's [Ryan Wilder's] time to shine." Later that same month, English actress Wallis Day was cast as Kate Kane, as the show's story involved Kate receiving surgical alteration to her face after an airplane crash left her injured. Rose, commenting on an Instagram tribute to her time in the role, said she was "stoked" about Day's casting.

In July 2021, Rose said she was allergic to latex, which was another reason for leaving Batwoman as her character's mask was made of latex. A few months later, in October, she began to publish allegations of an abusive and dangerous working environment on the Batwoman set, naming Warner Bros. executive Peter Roth, costars Dougray Scott and Camrus Johnson, and others on the production as responsible parties. However, in response, Johnson stated that Rose had not quit but had been fired from Batwoman, with Warner Bros. then releasing a statement responding to the accusations, saying that "Warner Bros Television had decided not to exercise its option to engage Ruby for season two" after "multiple complaints about her workplace behaviour".

==== 2020–present ====
On 22 May 2020, Rose portrayed Viola in a livestreamed table-read of Twelfth Night as part of Acting for a Cause benefit to raise money for COVID-19 pandemic relief. (Note: Nicole Kang, who portrays Mary Hamilton on Batwoman, was also a part of this production, playing Maria.) She was also set to star in the action comedy Three Sisters. In November 2021, Rose took a sabbatical from Hollywood to return to her native Australia.

In July 2026, it was announced that Rose would join the cast of the Fox reality television series Special Forces: World's Toughest Test for its fifth season.

=== Music and charity work ===
In February 2012, Rose released her first single "Guilty Pleasure" with Gary Go. In November 2016, she released and directed The Veronicas' single "On Your Side". She is a supporter of many charities, won a charity boxing match, and has travelled to Laos and Africa to volunteer each year.

Issues of concern to Rose include animal welfare, campaigns for anti-bullying and youth mental health, where she works as an ambassador for Headspace. Known for being extensively tattooed, she showed off her tattoos in a photo spread for Maxim Australia and PETA, as part of the campaign "I'd Rather Go Naked Than Wear Fur."

== Personal life ==
Rose came out as a lesbian at age 12. She has said that she was bullied both verbally and physically by her male peers because of her sexuality and gender variance. She has also stated that she was sexually abused as a child by a relative. She experienced suicidal thoughts and attempted suicide at age 12. She has struggled with mental health issues throughout her life, having attempted suicide multiple times, and has been diagnosed with complex post-traumatic stress disorder and clinical depression (initially misdiagnosed as bipolar disorder).

Rose has said that she was convinced she was a boy while growing up, and that she was saving up money to physically transition from female to male. She said, "It was in my mind as something I wanted to do and then I just... didn't."

Rose said in 2015, "I am very genderfluid and feel more like I wake up every day sort of gender neutral." This announcement came approximately a week after she released Break Free, in which she visually transforms from a feminine-presenting woman to a heavily tattooed masculine-presenting person. She stated that she prefers to continue using feminine pronouns, but also uses they/them pronouns. She said that if she had to choose a sex, she would choose to be male, but she does not feel like she should have been born with different body parts. Seeing the desire her transgender friends had for transitioning, she asked herself if her need to transition matched theirs, and concluded that it did not: "I think at this stage I will stay a woman but ... who knows. I'm so comfortable right now I feel wonderful about it, but I also fluctuate a lot."

Rose is a vegan and supports the Geelong Cats of the Australian Football League.

Rose dated The Veronicas singer Jessica Origliasso in 2008. She was engaged to fashion designer Phoebe Dahl from 2014 until they ended their relationship in December 2015. She rekindled her relationship with Origliasso from October 2016 to April 2018.

In 2019, Rose underwent emergency spinal surgery to treat two herniated discs caused by performing her own stunts on the set of Batwoman and revealed she would have been at risk of paralysis without the surgery.

In April 2026, on Threads, Rose accused Katy Perry of sexually assaulting her in the Spice Market nightclub in Melbourne nearly two decades earlier.

== In the media ==
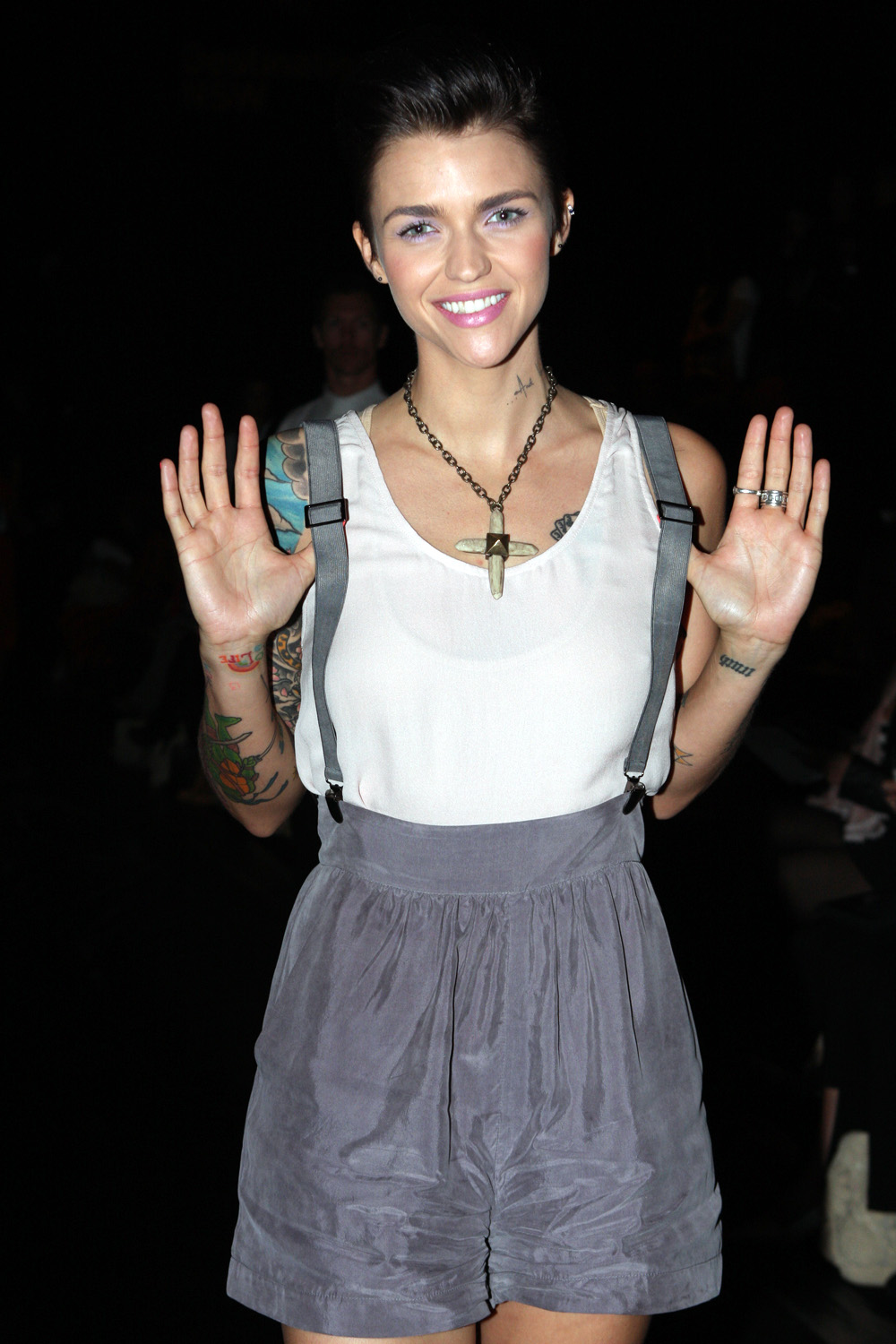
Rose at Australian Fashion Week in 2012

Various media outlets have commented on public fascination with Rose's gender identity, gender expression, and physical appearance, including her tattoos and visual or behavioral similarities to Angelina Jolie, Justin Bieber, and a younger Leonardo DiCaprio. In 2008 and 2009, she was chosen as one of the "25 Most Influential Gay and Lesbian Australians" by SameSame, an Australian online gay and lesbian community. The public and media attention increased following Rose's debut on Orange Is the New Black, significantly with regard to heterosexual women commenting on her physical appearance. During 2015, she was the fifth-most-searched person on Google. PETA named her one of three "Sexiest Vegans" of 2017.

Emma Teitel of Maclean's stated, "Rose... resembles an androgynous Angelina Jolie; she is a rare combination of angular and soft. She is a badass with a permanently arched brow and a Justin Bieber haircut. In other words, she is the lesbian James Dean. And straight women are falling madly in love with her." Alex Rees of Cosmopolitan said that everyone was enamored of Rose at the time of her season three appearance on Orange Is the New Black.

Rose acknowledged the public discourse concerning her physical appearance and subsequent debate on sexual fluidity after heterosexual women said they would "go gay" for her, commenting that while she was neutral on the matter, some found the public affection toward her inappropriate because they believe it implied people can choose to be gay. Rose said she believes people are being complimentary when making such comments rather than trying to be derogatory or diminish the coming out process. She said today's society is more open about sexuality than in the past and that people should not nitpick who can or cannot identify as genderqueer, gender-neutral, bisexual or transgender, or tell them how to live their lives, and that this is a message the LGBT community should be supporting.

== Filmography ==
=== Film ===
Year	Title	Role	Notes	Ref.
2013	Around the Block	Hannah	Film debut	
2014	Break Free	Herself	Short film; also producer	
2016	Sheep and Wolves	Bianca	Voice role (English dub)	
2016	Resident Evil: The Final Chapter	Abigail		
2017	XXX: Return of Xander Cage	Adele Wolff		
2017	John Wick: Chapter 2	Ares		
2017	Pitch Perfect 3	Calamity		
2018	The Meg	Jaxx Herd		
2020	Cranston Academy: Monster Zone	Liz	Voice role (English dub)	
2020	The Doorman	Alexandra "Ali" Gorski		
2021	SAS: Red Notice	Grace Lewis		
2021	Vanquish	Victoria "Vicky"		
2022	1Up	Parker		
2022	Stowaway	Bella Denton		
2022	Taurus	Bub		
2023	The Collective	Daisy		
2024	Dirty Angels	Medic		

=== Television ===
Year	Title	Role	Notes	Ref.
2007–2011	MTV Australia	Herself	VJ	
2009–2010	20 to 1	Herself	2 episodes	
2009	Talkin' 'Bout Your Gen	Herself	Guest	
2009	Australia's Next Top Model	Herself	Guest judge / Co-host	
2009	MTV Australia Awards 2009	Herself	Host	
2009–2011	The Project	Herself	Co-host	
2010	Ultimate School Musical	Herself	Host	
2010	Logie Awards of 2010	Herself	Host	
2010	2010 Winter Olympics	Herself	Host	
2013	Mr & Mrs Murder	Herself	Episode: "Early Checkout"	
2015–2016	Orange Is the New Black	Stella Carlin	Recurring role; 9 episodes (seasons 3–4); Screen Actors Guild Award for Outstanding Performance by an Ensemble in a Comedy Series; Nominated – Glamour Award for International TV Actress	
2015	Dark Matter	Wendy	Episode: "Episode Seven"	
2015	2015 MTV Europe Music Awards	Herself	Co-host	
2017	Lip Sync Battle	Herself	Episode: "Milla Jovovich vs. Ruby Rose"	
2018–2019	The Flash	Kate Kane / Batwoman	Episodes: "Elseworlds, Part 1" (uncredited) and "Crisis on Infinite Earths, Part 3"	
2018–2019	Arrow	Kate Kane / Batwoman	Episodes: "Elseworlds, Part 2" and "Crisis on Infinite Earths, Part 4"	
2018–2019	Supergirl	Kate Kane / Batwoman	Episodes: "Elseworlds, Part 3" and "Crisis on Infinite Earths, Part 1"	
2019–2020	Batwoman	Kate Kane / Batwoman	Lead role; 20 episodes (season 1)	
2020	Legends of Tomorrow	Kate Kane / Batwoman	Episode: "Crisis on Infinite Earths, Part 5"	
2020	Acting for a Cause	Viola	Episode: "Twelfth Night"	
2022	Ink Master	Herself	Guest judge; Episode: "Panes of Pressure"	
2026	Special Forces: World's Toughest Test	Herself	Contestant (Season 5)	

=== Music videos ===
Year	Title	Artist	Role	Notes
2011	"Boys like You"	360	Love interest	
2012	"Guilty Pleasure"	Herself and Gary Go	Herself	
2016	"On Your Side"	The Veronicas	Love interest	Also writer and director
2017	"How A Heart Unbreaks"	Evermoist	Calamity	From Pitch Perfect 3
2020	"Yo Visto Así"	Bad Bunny	Herself	

== Awards and nominations ==
Year	Association	Category	Nominated work	Result	Ref.	Notes
2009	ASTRA Awards	Favourite Female Personality	Herself	Won		
2015	British LGBT Awards	Celebrity Rising Star	Herself	Nominated		
2015	GQ Australia	Woman of the Year	Herself	Won		
2016	British LGBT Awards	Celebrity of the Year	Herself	Nominated		
2016	GLAAD Media Award	GLAAD Stephen F. Kolzak Award	Herself	Won		Honoured at 27th Annual GLAAD Media Awards.
2016	Glamour Awards	NEXT Breakthrough	Herself	Nominated		
2020	Queerty Awards	TV Performance	Batwoman	Nominated		
2022	Golden Raspberry Awards	Worst Actress	Vanquish	Nominated		
