= Reborn (2018 film) =

- Directed by: Julian Richards
- Written by: Michael Mahin
- Starring: Barbara Crampton; Michael Paré; Chaz Bono; Monte Markham; Rae Dawn Chong; Kayleigh Gilbert
- Release date: 2018
- Country: United States
- Language: English

Reborn is a 2018 American horror film directed by Julian Richards, and written by Michael Mahin. It stars Barbara Crampton, Michael Paré, Chaz Bono, Monte Markham, Rae Dawn Chong, and Kayleigh Gilbert.

== Plot ==
A hospital morgue experiences an electrical surge which shocks a stillborn baby, bringing her back to life. A disturbed attendant named Ken, who secretly takes photographs of corpses in the morgue, adopts the baby as his sister. Given the name Tess, the resurrected girl has the power to manipulate electricity. She is left unaware of the circumstances of her "birth", believing that she was abandoned by mistake rather than outright dead. On her 16th birthday, Tess discovers Ken's illicit photos, angering Ken, who attacks her. Tess's power awakens and she kills Ken.

Tess then goes looking for her biological mother, actress turned drama coach Lena O'Neill. Reluctant to reveal her identity straight away, she tries to get closer to Lena by infiltrating her group of drama students. As she gains more control over her power, Tess confronts and kills the physician who unsuccessfully delivered her, Dr. Ince, as well as Lena's agent Dory and student Gia.

Eventually the police, led by Detective Fox, link Tess to the murders. Tess admits her identity to a shocked Lena. Fox calls Lena to warn her of Tess's true nature, but Tess, not wanting to lose her mother again, grabs hold of Lena and refuses to let her go. Fox arrives and fatally shoots Tess.

In the final scene, Lena and Fox are laying flowers at Tess's grave when a decomposing arm bursts through the soil and grabs Lena. The scene suddenly cuts to Lena waking up in bed, apparently from a nightmare. This is then shown to be a scene from a film she is starring in: Darklands, directed by Peter Bogdanovich.

== Cast ==
- Barbara Crampton as Lena O'Neill
- Michael Paré as Detective Fox
- Chaz Bono as Ken Stern
- Monte Markham as Dr. Hetch
- Rae Dawn Chong as Dory Ryder
- Kayleigh Gilbert as Tess

== Production ==
Principal photography was completed in February 2018.
