= Andrew Matarazzo =

Brazilian-American actor

- Born: Andréa Matarazzo; March 4, 1997 (age 29); São Paulo, Brazil
- Occupations: actor; singer; author
- Years active: 2011–present
- Relatives: Ciccillo Matarazzo (great-great-uncle); Jade Matarazzo (mother); Count Francesco Matarazzo (great-great-great-uncle)

Andrew Matarazzo (born March 4, 1997) is a Brazilian-American actor, singer and author, best known for joining the cast of the MTV television series Teen Wolf in its final season, and for writing the apocalyptic BEDLAM Trilogy: BEDLAM (2023), SWEVEN (2024), and ZENITH (2025).

== Early life ==
Matarazzo was born in São Paulo, Brazil but raised mostly in Miami, Florida as part of a diverse, multilingual family where he grew up speaking Portuguese, English and Spanish. His mother Jade Matarazzo is a leader at the forefront of the Latino arts community both for her own work and helping expose other international artists to American audiences. Although he had performed on stage since childhood, Matarazzo only decided to branch into film after seeing River Phoenix in Stand by Me.

He studied in Thorpe, Surrey near London at the American School in England (TASIS) as well as spending some time at University of the Arts (Philadelphia) and the California Institute of the Arts (CalArts) in Los Angeles.

== Career ==
In Los Angeles, Matarazzo, landed roles in a series of festival circuit short films that ran at Tribeca Film Festival and Cannes Film Festival. He went on to play small roles in several television shows including HBO's Girls, MTV's Faking It, Criminal Minds on CBS, and Speechless on ABC.

Matarazzo auditioned for Teen Wolf in 2016 but did not get the part for which he read. Two weeks later, Teen Wolf executive producer Jeff Davis contacted the actor to say they wanted Matarazzo for a three-episode arc. After seeing his work, Davis and the show's writers extended the role through the series finale and made Matarazzo's character Gabe one of the season's primary villains.

== Filmography ==
=== Film ===
Year	Title	Role	Notes
2013	West Hollywood Motel	Alex	
2015	Entourage	Raver Kid	Uncredited
2021	He's All That	Logan	
2021	Alalia	Leo	(Short)

=== Television ===
Year	Title	Role	Notes
2014	Faking It	Manolo	Episode: "Lust in Translation"
2015	Criminal Minds	Eddie Butler	Episode: "Outlaw"
2015	Girls	Dean	Episode "Ask Me My Name"
2015	Royal Pains	Vincent	Episode "Leading Me A Shoulder"
2017	Speechless	Aaron	Episode: "D-I-DING"
2017	Teen Wolf	Gabe	Recurring role; 7 episodes
2017	Jane the Virgin	Flaco	Recurring role
2020	Solar Opposites	Pedro	Episode: "The Quantum Ring"
2020	Acting for a Cause	Oberon / Theseus	Episode: "A Midsummer Night's Dream"
2021	All Rise	Alfredo Castro	Episode: "Safe to Fall"
2022	Acting for a Cause	Caska	Episode: "Julius Caesar LIVE!"

== Author ==
The BEDLAM Trilogy—BEDLAM (2023), SWEVEN (2024), and ZENITH (2025)—is a series that was initially serialized online and later published commercially. The trilogy follows young survivors forced to confront infected creatures, fractured alliances, and the moral weight of rebuilding a world that may never return to what it once was. At its core, the series examines survival, the power of chosen family, and the difficult work of rebuilding something hopeful from the ruins of collapse.
