= Josh Webber =

Canadian-American filmmaker (born 1986)

Josh Webber at the 2026 Tribeca Festival for The Leader

Josh A. Webber (born December 20, 1986) is a Canadian-American filmmaker, director, screenwriter, and producer known for his feature films. His most recent titles include Love Me Dead (2025), starring Dove Cameron and RJ Mitte, and Dog Patrol (2025), starring Cuba Gooding Jr. He also released the biopic Pardon Me (2025). He has written, directed, and produced a range of works including There Is Many Like Us (2015), Secrets of Deception (2017), Never Heard (2018), and Born a Champion (2021).

Webber is the founder of Webber Films, a Beverly Hills–based production company. Webber has also worked as the Director of Photography and editor on several television programs and with corporate clients such as Sony Pictures, Netflix, General Motors, Ford, McDonald's, DreamWorks, Warner Brothers, Budweiser, and Red Bull to produce promotional videos, documentaries, and commercials.

== Early life and education ==
Webber was born in Halifax, Nova Scotia, and raised in Montreal, Quebec. He initially studied international business at Arizona State University before moving to New York to pursue filmmaking. He later graduated from the New York Film Academy in 2009 with a focus on directing and screenwriting.

His first short film, Batter Up (2009), won the Golden Honu Award for Best Family Short in the Big Island Film Festival and received awards in several North American Film Festivals including Best Family Film in the Palm Beach International Film Festival, and Best Canadian Film in the Young Cuts Film Festival.

== Career ==
In 2009, Webber's short film Batter Up won Best Family Short at the Big Island Film Festival and earned recognition from the Palm Beach International and YoungCuts Film Festivals.

His feature directorial debut, A Broken Code (2012), earned “Excellence in Filmmaking” honors at the Canada International Film Festival.

In 2013, Newark Ave, a found-footage-style thriller, was released through Maverick Entertainment.

In 2015, Webber wrote and directed There Is Many Like Us, a Holocaust docudrama about Max Fronenberg's escape from a Nazi camp. The film was featured in multiple Jewish media outlets including the Canadian Jewish News and The Jewish Press.

In 2017, he directed the thriller Secrets of Deception, starring Tom Sizemore and Lorenzo Lamas, which was distributed through Sony Pictures Home Entertainment.

In 2018, Webber directed the faith-based drama Never Heard, starring Romeo Miller, David Banner, Robin Givens, and Karrueche Tran.

In 2019, Dear Frank, a psychological thriller starring Brian White, Columbus Short, Claudia Jordan, and Lil Durk, was released and distributed by UrbanflixTV.

In 2020, American Rackets, a mob documentary based on the life of Rocco Napoli—who stood trial for conspiracy to kill notorious mob boss John "Johnny Gabby" Gotti—was released.

In 2021, he served as a producer on Born a Champion, a martial arts drama starring Sean Patrick Flanery and Dennis Quaid.

In 2022, American Trash marked the directorial debut of Robert LaSardo, with Webber serving as executive producer.

In 2024, Webber also served as executive producer on Break the Cycle.

In 2025, Webber released Dog Patrol (formerly titled Athena Saves Christmas), a family-adventure film starring Cuba Gooding Jr.

=== Love Me Dead (formerly Issac) ===
Love Me Dead is a psychological thriller directed and co-written by Webber. The film stars RJ Mitte as Isaac and Dove Cameron as Cassi, following a surreal journey of trauma, love, and revenge. The film premiered on October 19, 2024, at the Freak Show Horror Film Festival and won multiple awards at the Cyprus Horror Society Film Festival. In 2025, the film held a specialty screening at the 78th Cannes Film Festival, where it received critical acclaim.

==== Cast ====
RJ Mitte as Issac • Dove Cameron as Cassi • Pia Mia • Robert LaSardo • Austyn Knight • Lauren Francesca • Gigi Gustin

The film was produced by Webber Films.

=== Pardon Me: The Bevelyn B. Williams Story (2025) ===
Webber also directed Pardon Me, a biographical drama based on the true life of pro-life activist Bevelyn Beatty Williams. The film stars Angela “Blac Chyna” White in the lead role, alongside Columbus Short, Jeremy Sumpter, and Rampage Jackson.

Production wrapped in 2025 and the film was released later that year.

== Selected filmography ==
Year	Title	Role(s)
2009	Batter Up	Director, Writer, Producer
2012	A Broken Code	Director, Writer, Producer
2013	Newark Ave	Director, Producer
2015	There Is Many Like Us	Director, Writer, Producer
2017	Secrets of Deception	Director, Producer
2018	Never Heard	Director, Producer
2019	Dear Frank	Director, Producer
2020	American Rackets	Director, Producer
2021	Born a Champion	Producer
2022	American Trash	Producer
2024	Break the Cycle	Executive Producer
2025	Love Me Dead	Director, Writer, Producer
2025	Dog Patrol	Director, Writer, Producer
2025	Pardon Me	Director, Producer

== Filmography ==
Television

- Ben Baller Show (2012–2013) (Season 1, 6 episodes; Season 2, 8 episodes) [Director of Photography]
- In Reverie (2012–2013) (11 episodes) [Director of Photography]
- Art of Punk (2013) (8 episodes) [Director of Photography]

Short Films

- Batter Up (2009) [Director, Producer, Writer, Editor]
- In His Shadow (2012) [Director of Photography]
- Bang (2013) [Director of Photography]
- White Wedding (2015) [Director, Producer, Director of Photography, Editor]
- Down the Scale (2015) [Director, Director of Photography, Editor]

=== Films ===
- 2009 Batter Up - Director, Writer, Producer
- 2012 A Broken Code - Director, Writer, Producer, Director of Photography, Editor
- 2013 Newark Ave - Director, Producer
- 2015 There Is Many Like Us (documentary film) - Director, Producer, Writer, Director of Photography, Editor
- 2017 Secrets of Deception - Director, Producer, Editor
- 2018 Never Heard - Director, Producer
- 2019 Dear Frank - Director, Producer
- 2020 American Rackets - Director, Producer
- 2021 Born a champion - Producer
- 2022 American Trash - Producer
- 2024 Break the cycle - Executive Producer
- 2025 Love Me Dead - Director, Writer, Producer
- 2025 Dog Patrol - Director, Writer, Producer
- 2025 Pardon Me - Director, Writer, Producer
