= AMC+ =

Video streaming service

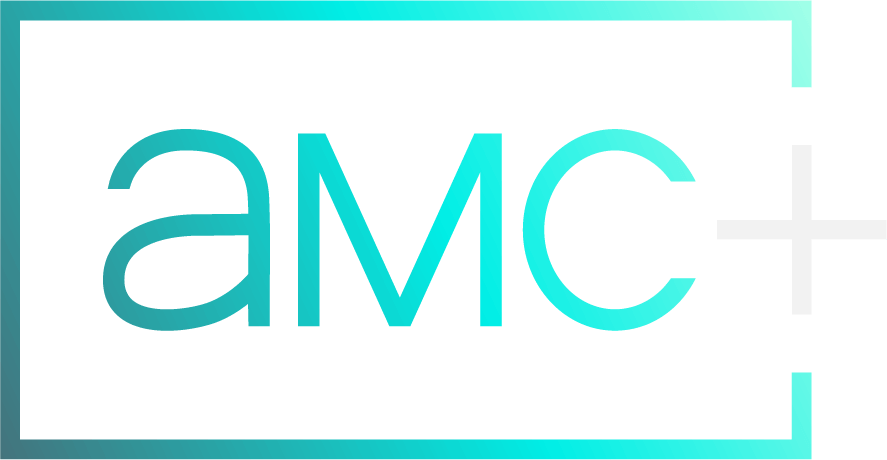
- Website type: OTT video streaming platform
- Predecessor: AMC Premiere
- Area served: United States; Canada; Australia; Spain; India; New Zealand
- Owner: AMC Global Media
- Key people: Miquel Penella (President of AMC Networks SVOD); Courtney Thomasma (General Manager of AMC+)
- Parent: AMC Networks Streaming
- Website: www.amcplus.com
- Users: 11.8 million (As of 2024)
- Launched: June 11, 2020; 6 years ago

AMC+ is an American subscription video-on-demand streaming service owned by AMC Global Media that was launched on June 11, 2020. The service is a premium bundle that includes the live feeds and program libraries of the company's television networks and streaming brands along with its own exclusive content.

== History ==
AMC+ was first launched on June 11, 2020, for Xfinity customers, and included content that was previously exclusive to subscribers of the AMC cable channel through its TV Everywhere AMC Premiere app. On October 1, 2020, AMC+ launched on Amazon Prime Video Channels and Apple TV Channels, and became available to Dish Network and Sling TV customers. On November 23, 2020, AMC+ launched on Roku. On April 6, 2021, AMC+ became available on YouTube TV. In the same month, AMC+ launched on DirecTV. In August 2021, AMC+ finally launched on TV, computer and mobile devices.

Former BBC America executive director Courtney Thomasma was named general manager of AMC+ on April 8, 2021. Thomasma reports to Miquel Penella, AMC Networks’ President of Subscription Video on Demand (SVOD).

In 2024, AMC Networks and Charter Communications reached an early renewal agreement for the distribution of AMC's portfolio of linear cable networks, which included complimentary access to AMC+ for Spectrum TV Select customers and the option to purchase the service for internet-only subscribers. Financial terms of the new deal were not disclosed, though it was described as extending "for multiple years to come".

== Content ==
AMC+ primarily features content from channel brands owned and operated by AMC Global Media, most notably its flagship channel AMC. Other cable channels include BBC America, IFC, and Sundance TV as well as the VOD streaming services Acorn TV, Shudder and Sundance Now. The service features early access to original series (such as AMC's The Walking Dead franchise), with new episodes offered up to a week before their cable television premieres. The service also includes exclusive films from the aforementioned channels and services as well as the film production companies IFC Films and RLJE Films, and sometimes with the Hidive streaming service.

In 2026, the service announced it was reducing the Shudder and Sundance Now libraries on AMC+.

== Exclusive programming ==
=== Original programming ===
- Gangs of London (2020–present) (Note: Co-production with Sky Atlantic for the second season onwards.)
- Ultra City Smiths (2021) (Note: These shows were previously available on AMC+, but have been since removed from the service.)
- Kin (2021) (Note: Co-production with RTÉ for the second season.)
- Happy Valley (2021–2023) (Note: Co-production with BBC One for the third season.) (Note: Simultaneous release with Acorn TV and BBC America.)
- Show Me More (2021–present) (Note: Also available on AMC.com)
- Ragdoll (2021) (Note: Co-production with Alibi.)
- Firebite (2021–2022)
- La Fortuna (2022) (Note: Co-production with Movistar+.)
- That Dirty Black Bag (2022)
- Slippin' Jimmy (2022)
- Cooper's Bar (season 1) (2022)
- This Is Going to Hurt (2022) (Note: Co-production with BBC One.) (Note: Simultaneous release with Sundance Now.)
- Moonhaven (2022)
- Pantheon (2022) (Note: Moved to Amazon Prime Video for season 2)

=== Acquired programming ===
- The Salisbury Poisonings (2020)
- Cold Courage (2021)
- Spy City (2021)
- Too Close (2021)
- The North Water (2021)
- Broke (2021)
- Anna (2021)
- Anne Boleyn (2021)
- The Ipcress File (2022)
- Slo Pitch (2022)
- Doctor Who (seasons 1–13; from June 11, 2026)

=== Exclusive films ===
- A Banquet (Note: Simultaneous release with Shudder.)
- Apex
- Archenemy
- Barbarians
- Catch the Fair One
- Clean
- Dual
- Happening
- I Am Mortal
- Last Looks
- No Man of God
- Paris, 13th District
- Prisoners of the Ghostland
- Revealer
- Rogue Agent (Note: Simultaneous release with IFC Films.)
- Section Eight (Note: Simultaneous release with RLJE Films.)
- Silent Night
- South of Heaven
- Spin Me Round
- Stowaway
- Survive the Game
- The Reef: Stalked
- The Tax Collector
- Warning

== Simulcast programming ==
=== Simulcast with AMC ===
- 61st Street (Note: Moved to The CW for season 2)
- The Audacity
- Better Call Saul
- Dark Winds
- Dispatches from Elsewhere
- Eli Roth's History of Horror
- Fear the Walking Dead
- Friday Night In with The Morgans
- Interview with the Vampire
- Kevin Can F**k Himself
- Lucky Hank
- Mayfair Witches
- Monsieur Spade
- Nautilus
- NOS4A2
- Orphan Black: Echoes
- Parish
- Ride with Norman Reedus
- Snowpiercer (season 4)
- Soulmates
- Talamasca: The Secret Order
- Tales of the Walking Dead
- Talking Dead
- The Terror
- The Walking Dead
- The Walking Dead: Daryl Dixon
- The Walking Dead: Dead City
- The Walking Dead: The Ones Who Live
- The Walking Dead: World Beyond
- You Are Here

=== Simulcast with BBC America ===
- Africa's Wild Year
- Killing Eve
- Meerkat Manor: Rise of the Dynasty
- The Split
- Ten Percent
- The Watch

=== Simulcast with IFC ===
- Brockmire
- Cooper's Bar (season 2)
- Documentary Now!
- Hullraisers
- Sherman's Showcase
- SisterS

=== Simulcast with Shudder ===
- The 101 Scariest Horror Movie Moments of All Time
- Behind the Monsters
- The Boulet Brothers' Dragula (season 4–present)
- The Boulet Brothers' Dragula: Titans
- Creepshow
- Cursed Films
- Deadhouse Dark
- Queer for Fear: The History of Queer Horror
- Slasher (seasons 4–5)

=== Simulcast with Sundance TV/Sundance Now ===
- Black Snow
- Clean Sweep
- Deutschland 89
- A Discovery of Witches
- The Gulf
- The Long Shadow
- The Pact
- Riviera
- Rosehaven
- Sanctuary: A Witch's Tale
- State of the Union
- The Suspect
- Totally Completely Fine
- True Crime Story
- The Vanishing Triangle
- Wisting
- Wrongly Accused

== Availability and distribution ==
The service launched in Canada on Amazon's Prime Video and Apple TV in August 2021, ahead of the premiere of the eleventh season of The Walking Dead. Some content on the American version of the service has not been made available in Canada due to varying programming rights.

The service launched in Australia as a channel on Prime Video and Apple TV as well in November 2021, which include Acorn TV on the package.

In March 2022, AMC+ launched in India via Apple TV Channels, including Acorn TV. In June, the service also launched on Prime Video.

The service was expected to be launched in New Zealand, Latin America and several European countries over 2022 and into 2023. Plans of further expansion were later suspended and no announcements of the service arriving in new countries have been made ever since.

In October 2022, AMC+ launched in New Zealand with a bundle option including access to both Acorn TV and Shudder. Also in the same month, KT added AMC+ into their newly rebranded Genie TV (formerly Olleh) as part of the service's one-stop Live TV & VOD platform.

Release date	Country/Territory	DTC app	Distribution partner(s)	Hubs
June 11, 2020	United States	Yes	June 11, 2020: Xfinity; October 1, 2020: Amazon Prime Video, Apple TV Channels, Dish Network, Sling TV; November 23, 2020: Roku Channels; April 6, 2021: YouTube TV; April 2021: DirecTV; August 2021: OTT	AMC, Shudder, BBC America, The Walking Dead franchise, and Sundance Now
August 16, 2021 (Note: Via Prime Video Channels and Apple TV Channels. The direct-to-consumer app was launched on September 28, 2022)	Canada	Yes	August 16, 2021: Amazon Prime Video, Apple TV Channels; September 28, 2022: OTT	AMC, Shudder, IFC Films Unlimited and Sundance Now
November 9, 2021	Australia	Yes	Prime Video, Apple TV Channels	AMC, Acorn TV, Shudder
March 22, 2022	India	No	Prime Video, Apple TV Channels	AMC, Acorn TV
June 13, 2022	Spain	No	Prime Video, Orange TV, Jazztel TV, Vodafone	AMC, Acorn TV, Planet Horror
September 28, 2022	New Zealand	Yes	Prime Video, Apple TV Channels	AMC, Acorn TV, Shudder
October 4, 2022	South Korea	No	Genie TV	AMC

== Reception ==
Stephen Silver of Make Use Of noted the "impressive amount of content on offer from AMC+" and its "winning combination of shows you know, new ones to discover, and a large library of movies."
