= Kayleigh Gilbert =

South African actress

- Born: Ermelo, South Africa
- Education: Lee Strasberg Theatre and Film Institute
- Occupation: Actress
- Notable work: Reborn

Kayleigh Gilbert is a South African actress.

== Early life ==
Gilbert was born in Ermelo, South Africa.

== Education ==
In 2012, Gilbert moved to Los Angeles, California. In March 2014, Gilbert graduated from the Lee Strasberg Theatre and Film Institute.

== Career ==
In 2018, she played Tess, the "monstrous daughter" in Reborn.

Gilbert speaks Afrikaans and Zulu, as well as English.

== Filmography ==
=== Film ===
- 2014 Baptized by the Weekend - Lindsay Greer.
- 2015 There Is Many Like Us - Production Manager, Rena.
- 2016 Widows - Karen.
- 2017 Break Night - Louly.
- 2018 Reborn - Tess Stern.
- 2019 Spiral Farm - Horizon.
