= Ultimate School Musical =

Australian reality television series

Ultimate School Musical is a Fox8 reality television programme in Australia which features ordinary teenagers from a school in the north-western suburbs of Melbourne (Essendon Keilor College), attempting to put on a music production to a professional standard in just six weeks.

== Australia ==
Ultimate School Musical, Australia, has been hosted by model and VJ Ruby Rose and directed by actor, comedian and musician Eddie Perfect.
