= Aves Argentinas =

Argentine non-profit environmental organization

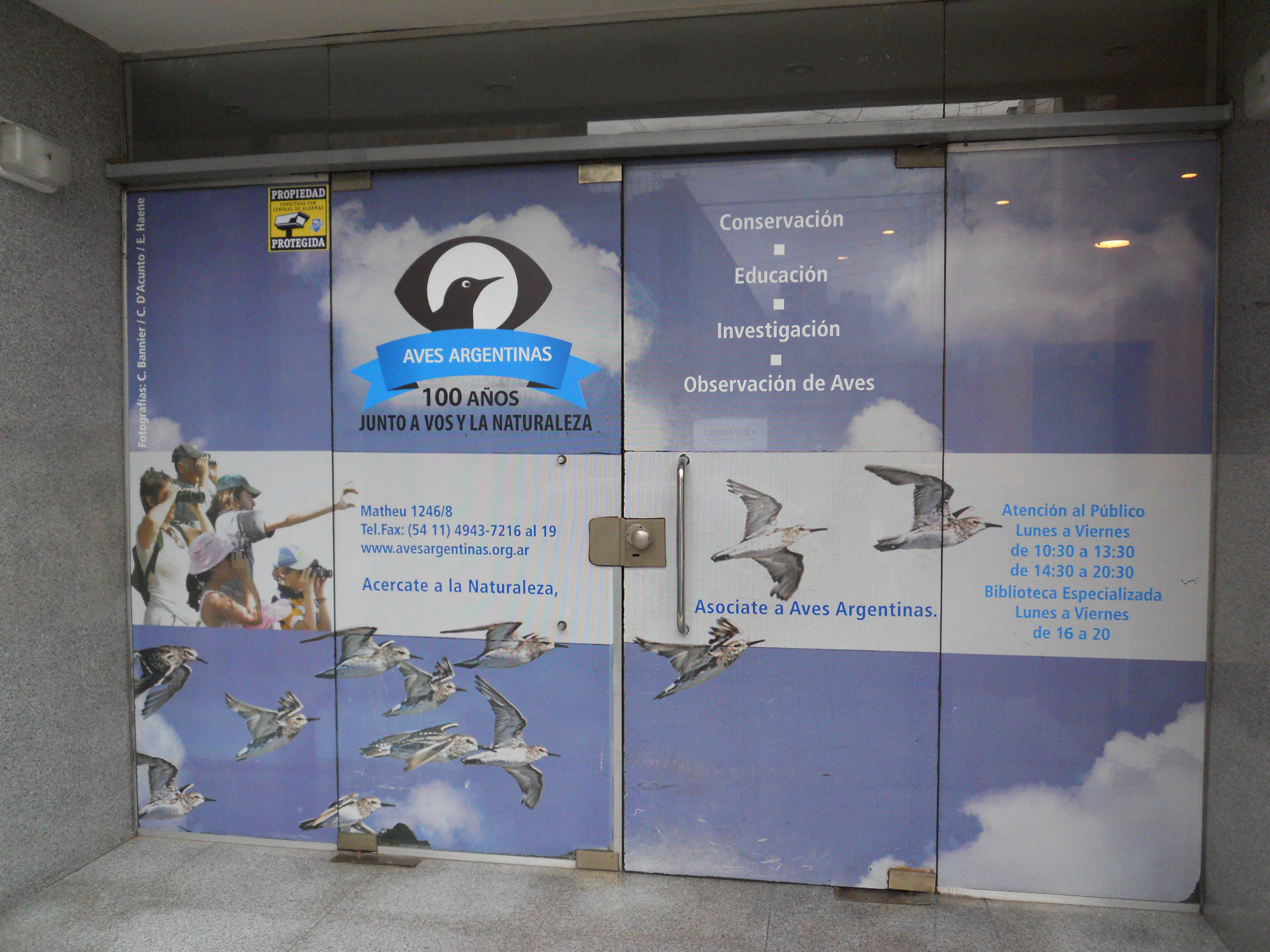
- Abbreviation: AA
- Formation: 1916
- Type: Non-profit organization
- Purpose: Humane protection of birds
- Headquarters: Buenos Aires, ARG
- Coordinates: 34°37′25.73″S 58°23′56.93″W
- Region served: Argentina
- Presidents: Tito Narosky and Mario Gustavo Costa
- Main organ: Board of Directors
- Website: http://www.avesargentinas.org.ar

Aves Argentinas / Asociación Ornitológica del Plata (in English: Argentine Birds), is an Argentine non-profit environmental organization dedicated to conservation and birdwatching. Created in 1916, it is the oldest environmental organization in South America.

The organization is involved in the re-introduction of the red-and-green macaw (Ara chloropterus) which has not been recorded in Argentina for some years. It is listed as critically endangered in Argentina, and listed as a ″a species of global least concern″ on the IUCN Red List. The first birds were released in 2015, in the Iberá Provincial Reserve (Spanish: Reserva Provincial Iberá) in north-eastern province of Corrientes

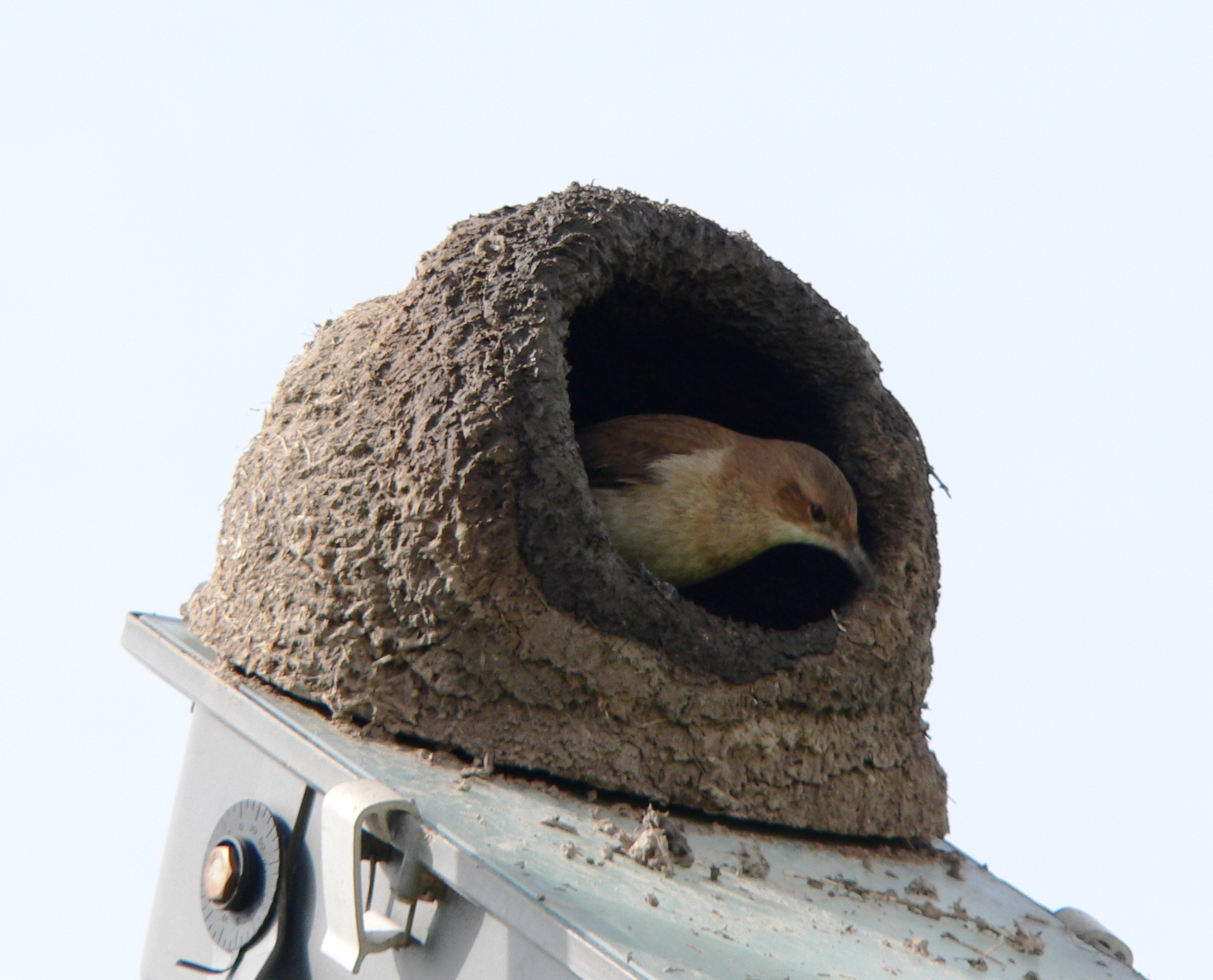
Rufous Hornero, bird symbol of this organization.
