= José Narosky =

Argentine notary public and writer

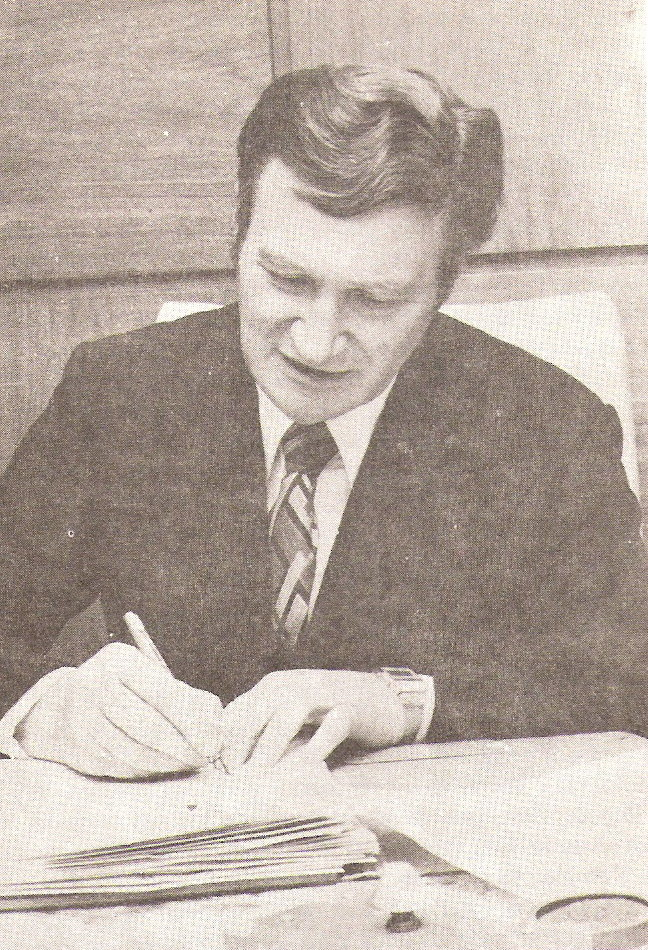
José Narosky

José Narosky (born 20 April 1930 in Darregueira, Province of Buenos Aires) is an Argentine notary public and writer. He is mostly known for his collections of aphorisms.

== Published books ==
- 1975 "Si todos los hombres" (in 2007 there were 32 editions, with more than 670,000 copies sold)
- 1977 "Si todos los tiempos..."
- 1979 "Si todos los sueños..."
- 1992 "Ecos"
- 1992 "Silencios"
- 1993 "Sendas"
- 2001 "Luces"
- 2003 "Sembremos...".
- 2006 "Aforismos, libro de oro".

== Notable quotes ==
- "In war, there are no unwounded soldiers", translated from the original "En las guerras no hay soldado sin heridas" in Si todos los tiempos..., and published in the Reader's Digest in 1981. This was repeated in the House of Representatives by Barbara Mikulski in the same year.
