= Stefanja Orlowska =

Australian actress and writer (born 1987)

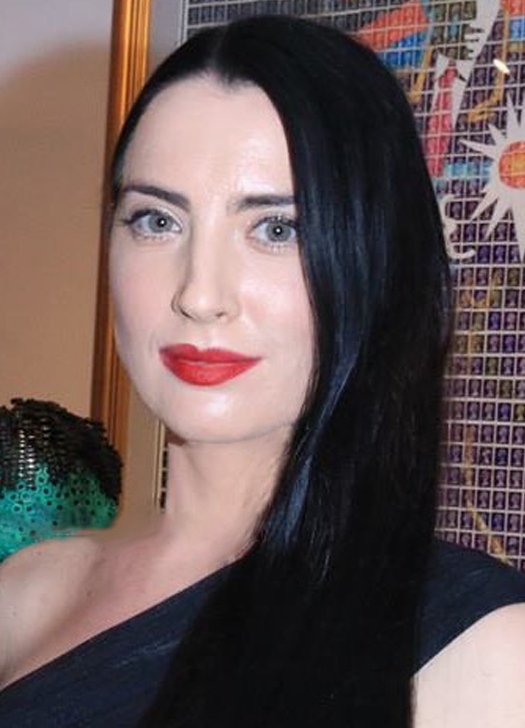
- Orlowska in 2017
- Born: 23 July 1987 (age 37); Canberra, Australia
- Education: Griffith University in Queensland
- Occupation(s): Actress, Writer
- Height: 5ft 7in (1.7 m)
- Relatives: Andrzej Krzysztof (brother)

Stefanja Orlowska (born 23 July 1987) is an Australian actress and writer. She made her film debut in 2011, in the independent film Minds, Adolescents. She is most known for her role as Halina in the documentary film There Is Many Like Us.

== Early life ==
Orlowska was born to Polish immigrants in Canberra, Australia. She has one older brother, fashion designer Andrzej Krzysztof. From an early age Orlowska was an active child attending Leg's Dance taking classes in Jazz, Tap and Ballet. Later she went on to study at the Australian Acting Academy picking up many improv skills.

After graduating from high school, Orlowska attended Griffith University, attaining a double computer degree. Although she studied intently, in 2010, Orlowska made the decision to relocate to Los Angeles to pursue a career in acting.

== Filmography ==
Year	Title	Role	Notes
2011	Minds, Adolescents	Jess	
2011	That's So Awesome	Bank Customer	TV series
2011	90210	Flower Girl	TV series
2011	Nerve	Bar Patron	
2012	A Broken Code	Arianna	Video
2012	How I Met Your Mother	Strip Club Waitress	
2013	Victoria's Secret	Victoria	Video short
2014	Wild Child	Sorina	Short film
2013	Extra-Ordinary	Interviewer	Short film
2015	There Is Many Like Us	Halina	Documentary
2016	The Last Tango	Jane	post-production
