= Jade Matarazzo =

Brazilian photographer and educator

- Born: Jade Matarazzo; April 26, 1966 (age 60); São Paulo, Brazil
- Education: Escola Panamericana de Arte, Art Institute of Fort Lauderdale, Sotheby's Institute of Art
- Style: Street photography
- Website: https://jadematarazzo.com/

Jade Matarazzo is a fine arts photographer, arts educator, and curator who creates cultural and social projects using art as a tool for cultural identity. She is the founder of The House of Arts and several other international projects, co-founder of Expoart Japan, Expoart London, and Ateliers Without Borders. Matarazzo is also the founder of Colecta Magazine, an art magazine launched during Art Basel Week 2020 addressing the international modern arts scene.

== Early life and education ==
Grandniece of noted Brazilian industrialist and arts patron Ciccillo Matarazzo, Jade Matarazzo grew up surrounded by the art and artists that came to Brazil from all over the world for the São Paulo Art Biennial. This early exposure to the works of Manabu Mabe, Tarsila do Amaral, Carybé, René Magritte, Candido Portinari, Picasso, and others would eventually lead her to her life's work.

She discovered a love for photography while attending an all-girls school in Switzerland. Matarazzo instantly fell in love with the camera and the stories she could tell through it. Pursuing an arts education, she attended the Escola Panamericana de Arte in her native Brazil and continued her studies at the Art Institute of Fort Lauderdale after moving to the United States in 1992.

In 2016, Matarazzo enrolled to further her education at Sotheby's Institute of Art to study art as a global business, curating and art history.

== Photography career ==
Matarazzo began exhibiting her work in 2002 at group shows at the Museum of the Americas in Florida as well as some galleries in Europe. Her first big solo exhibition, "Boundaries" at the Solange Rabello gallery in Miami in 2005, consisted of 40 photographs. She sold almost all the work and marks this show as her transition from student to professional photographer.

In 2013 Matarazzo joined with other artists for a special project documenting the Japanese culture in her native Brazil. Japanese Brazilians are the largest Japanese descendant community outside of Japan. Matarazzo worked alongside photographer Kazuo Okubo, sculptor Yutaka Toyota, and mixed media painter Catarina Gushiken as part of the "West Encounters East" project. Matarazzo used her time there to capture the faces of the 2013 Tanabata or "Star Festival" held in the Liberdade district of São Paulo. In 2015, her "Views of Tanabata" exhibit appeared at the Morikami Museum in Palm Beach County and in Tokyo.

Matarazzo recently celebrated the first ten years of her career with an exhibit called "Ever Changing Perspectives" in her home town of São Paulo, as well as New York and Miami.

=== Selected Exhibits ===
- 2017 New York BEA | Ever Changing Perspectives
- 2017 Jo Slaviero & Guedes Galeria de Arte (São Paulo)|Ever Changing Perspectives
- 2017 Tokyo - Tanabata
- 2015 Morikami Museum (Palm Beach)|Tanabata: West Encounters East
- 2013 Design District (Miami)|Ornare
- 2012 Artserve Gallery (Fort Lauderdale)|Storytelling through photography
- 2009 BCC Art Gallery (Miami)|2009 Tenth Contemporary Art Show
- 2008 Los Angeles Municipal Gallery - Contemporary Views of Brazil, Cuba and Haiti
- 2007 Hollywood Playhouse Art Gallery (Hollywood)|Compassion
- 2007 Sunrise Civic Center - Higher Grounds
- 2006 Solange Rabelo Gallery - Boundaries

=== Awards ===
- 2020 Best Highlight Gallery at Red Dot - The House of Arts
- 2019 Focus Brazil Visual Arts Awards - Outstanding Achievement - Kobra Mural at Adrienne Arsht Center
- 2019 Red Dot Awards - Best New Exhibitor - The Wall of Arts
- 2018 Focus Brazil Visual Arts Awards - Best Fine Art Photographer
- 2017 Focus Brazil Visual Arts Awards - Best Visual Arts Event - Art Brazil
- 2016 International Press Awards - Best Cultural Event - Art Brazil
- 2015 International Press Awards - Best Visual Arts Event - Art Brazil
- 2014 International Brazilian Press Award – Best Photographer
- 2012 International Brazilian Press Award – Best Visual Artist
- 2008 Wolfgang Amadeus Award in Vienna, Austria – Curves
- 2006 Francisco de Goya Award – Barcelona, Spain – Mind Over Matter

== Patron to Brazilian Art ==
In 2010 Just as her mentor Ciccillo Matarazzo had done 61 years before with international artists in Brazil, Jade Matarazzo founded Brazilian Art Exhibitions to bring international attention to emerging Brazilian artists in the United States. As curator and director her initial goal was to provide a cultural and commercial platform for showcasing new talent.

The Exhibitions became month-long events featuring venues in both Miami-Dade and Broward Counties. More than 500 Brazilian artists have taken part over the years representing a variety of mediums from photography and painting to sculpture and ceramics, and more than 3000 local K-12 students took part in touring the exhibits, attending workshops and interacting directly with the artists.

Matarazzo partners with FocusBrazil on annual international "ExpoArt" showcases in Miami, London, and Tokyo. These events provide Brazilian artists the opportunity to share their work and garner new cultural experiences.

=== Arts education ===
In 2017, as part of Matarazzo's educational outreach, she launched The Traveling Artist/Atelier Without Borders. The project brings workshops, performances, and exhibitions to schools, hospitals, nursing homes, shelters for displaced persons, and underprivileged communities. In the last three years, over 3.000 students have participated of workshops, field trips and art installations as part of Matarazzo’s educational programs with schools like Ada Merritt, Doral Charter Elementary and Adrienne Arsht Center for The Performing Arts.
