= South American Bird Fair =

- Type: South American Birding Meeting
- Location: Cycles through South American countries
- Region served: birdwatching

The South American Birdwatching Fair or Birdwatching Congress is an annual event for birdwatchers, held every year in a different country of the continent. It is recognized by many to be a popular meeting event for birdwatchers that occurs annually in South America, attracting people from all over the world due to it being the largest event of its kind.

The South American Birdwatching Fair was initially created by bird enthusiasts who wanted to replicate a similar experience to the British Birdwatching Fair or other similar events, in South America. Many of the attendees are part of various groups such as the South American Classification Committee, Cornell Lab of Ornithology, and many other notable groups.

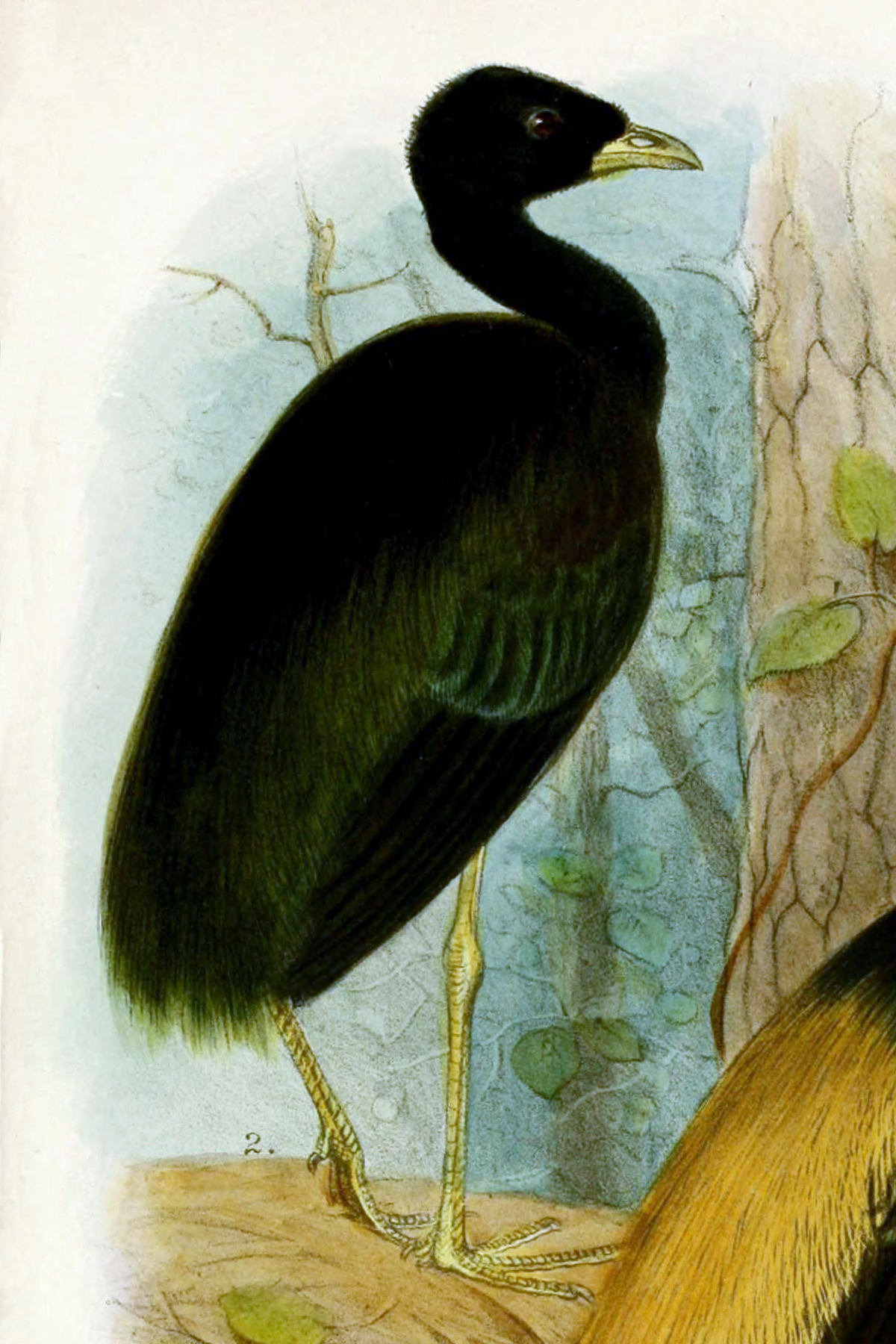
South American Bird

The event is made to promote networking, participate in workshops, attend lectures and go on birding trips to view native birds that are only present in specific locations.

This fair was paused in 2020 due to the global pandemic of COVID-19, and resumed in 2021 in Caldas, Colombia .

== Years of Occurrence ==
- 2010-2013: San Martín de los Andes, Argentina
  - November 28–30, 2013
- 2015: V South American Bird Fair / Paraty, Brasil
- 2016: VI South American Bird Fair / San Isidro, Buenos Aires, Argentina
  - November 1–7, 2016
- 2017: VII South American Bird Fair / Puerto Varas, Chile
  - October 26–29, 2017
- 2018: VIII South American Bird Fair / Manizales, Colombia
  - November 1–5, 2018
- 2019: IX South American Bird Fair / Punta del Este, Uruguay
  - November 7–11, 2019
- 2021: X South American Bird Fair / Manizales, Colombia
  - November 11–14, 2021
- 2022: XI South American Bird Fair / Cusco, Perú
  - November 10–13, 2022
- 2023: XII South American Bird Fair / Mindo, Ecuador
  - October 26–29, 2023
- 2024: XIII South American Bird Fair / Iberá Wetlands, Ituzaingó, Corrientes, Argentina.
- 2025: XIIII South American Bird Fair / La Paz, Bolivia
  - October 16–19, 2025
- 2026: XV South American Bird Fair. Asunción, Paraguay

== Organization ==
The South American Birdwatching Fair consists of three committees: the Advisory Committee, the Organizing Committee, and the Local Organizing Committee.

As of 2024, the International Committee now consists of:

- Horacio Matarasso (Argentina) / President
- Martha Argel (Brazil)
- Bruno Arantes Bueno (Brazil)
- Sebastian Herzog (Bolivia)
- Raffaele di Biase (Chile)
- Carolina Yañez Rismondo (Chile)
- Mónica Londoño Arango (Colombia)
- Carlos M. Wagner (Colombia)
- Xavier Amigo (Ecuador)
- Óscar Rodríguez Scelza (Paraguay)
- Steve Sánchez (Peru)
- Gonzalo Millacet (Uruguay)
- Mauricio Zanoletti (Venezuela)

== News about the Fair ==
- News from Argentina
- Local news
- Web news
- Tiempo Argentino
- Noticias Online

== Pictures of the Fair ==
See Pictures at album
