= Gustav Schwarzenegger =

Austrian police chief and father of Arnold Schwarzenegger (1907-1972)

- Schwarzenegger in 1945
- Born: 1 August 1907; Mürzzuschlag, Duchy of Styria, Archduchy of Austria, Cisleithania, Austria-Hungary
- Died: 13 December 1972 (aged 65); Weiz, Styria, Austria
- Burial place: Weiz Cemetery, Weiz, Styria, Austria
- Spouse: Aurelia Jadrny (m. 1945)
- Children: 2, including Arnold
- Military career
- Allegiance: First Austrian Republic; Federal State of Austria; Germany; Austrian Republic
- Branch: Austrian Land Forces; German Army
- Service years: 1930–1937 (Austria); 1939–1944 (Germany)
- Rank: Stabsfeldwebel
- Units: Feldgendarmerie-Abteilung 521 (mot.), 4th Panzer Army
- Conflicts: World War II; Operation Barbarossa; Siege of Leningrad (WIA)
- Awards: Iron Cross 1st Class; Iron Cross 2nd Class; Eastern Medal; Wound Badge Black/3rd Class
- Other work: Policeman

Gustav Gottfried Schwarzenegger (1 August 1907 – 13 December 1972) was an Austrian police chief (Gendarmeriekommandant), postal inspector, member of the Sturmabteilung (SA), and military police officer. He was the father of former governor of California and actor Arnold Schwarzenegger.

== Biography ==
Schwarzenegger was born on 1 August 1907 in Mürzzuschlag, the son of Karl Schwarzenegger (1872–1927) and wife Cecelia (née Hinterleitner, 1878–1968). His paternal grandfather, Wenzel (Václav) Mach, was Czech, and came from the small village of Chocov near Mladá Vožice, in the Kingdom of Bohemia in the Lands of the Bohemian Crown of the Austrian Empire. Vaclav had a child out of wedlock with Kunigunde Schwarzenegger, and the child was originally named Carl Mach, but later adopted his mother's surname, Schwarzenegger.

== Nazi Party and SA membership ==
According to documents obtained in 2003 from the Austrian State Archives by the Los Angeles Times, (Note: This was following the expiration of a 30-year seal on Schwarzenegger's records under Austrian privacy laws.) Schwarzenegger applied to join the Sturmabteilung (SA), the Nazi Party's paramilitary wing, on 1 March 1939. Austria became part of Nazi Germany after being annexed on 12 March 1938. A separate record obtained by the Wiesenthal Center indicates he sought membership before the annexation, but was accepted only in January 1941.

Schwarzenegger also applied to become a member of the SA on 1 May 1939, a year after the annexation of Austria, at a time when SA membership was declining. The SA had 900,000 members in 1940, down from 4.2 million in 1934. This six-year decline in SA membership was an extended result of the three-day-long purge known as the Night of the Long Knives, a political purge carried out by Adolf Hitler against the SA, seen at that time as too radical and too powerful by senior military and industrial leaders within the Nazi party.

== Military career ==
Schwarzenegger had served in the Austrian Army from 1930 to 1937, achieving the rank of section commander and, in 1937, he became a police officer. After enlisting in the Wehrmacht in November 1939, Schwarzenegger, according to his Soldbuch, had gained the rank of Stabsfeldwebel (sergeant major) of the Feldgendarmerie, which acted as military police units. He served in Poland, France, Belgium, Ukraine, Lithuania and the Soviet Union. His unit was Feldgendarmerie-Abteilung 521 (mot.), part of Panzer Group 4.

Wounded in action in the Siege of Leningrad, in Leningrad, Russia, on 22 August 1942, Schwarzenegger was awarded the Iron Cross 1st and 2nd Classes for bravery, the Eastern Medal, and the Wound Badge Black/3rd Class; he also received significant medical attention for his injuries. Initially treated at a military hospital in Łódź, the capital of the General Government, according to the records, Schwarzenegger also suffered recurring bouts of malaria, which led to his discharge in February 1944. Considered unfit for active duty, he returned to Graz, Alpine and Danube Reichsgaue (Austria), where he was assigned to work as a postal inspector.

A health registry document describes him as a "calm and reliable person, not particularly outstanding" and assesses his intellect as "average." Ursula Schwarz, a historian at Vienna's Documentation Centre of Austrian Resistance, has argued that Schwarzenegger's career was fairly typical for his generation, and that no evidence has emerged directly linking him with participation in war crimes or abuses against civilians. He resumed his police career in 1947.

== Later life and death ==
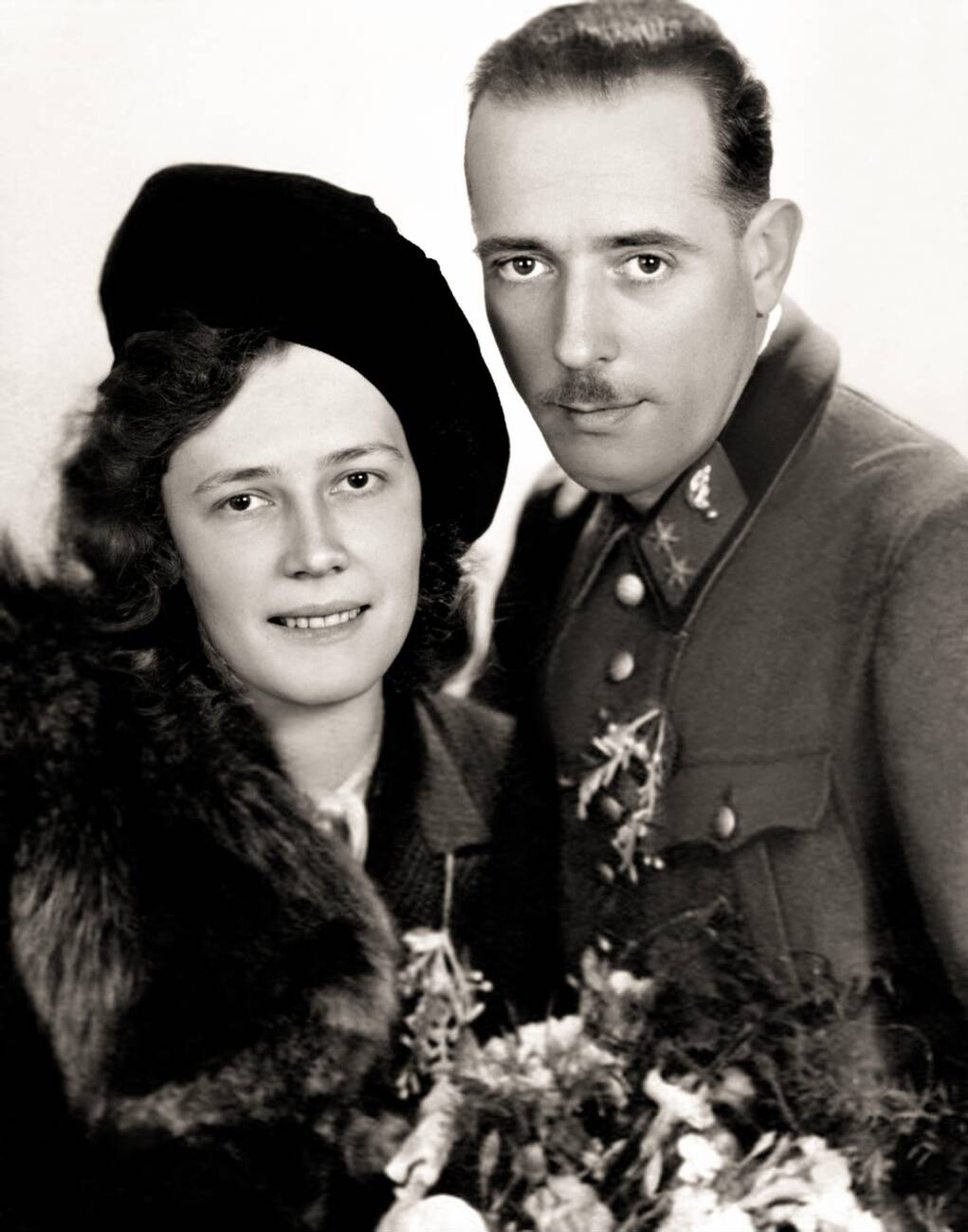
Gustav and Aurelia Schwarzenegger on their wedding day, October 20, 1945

Schwarzenegger married war widow Aurelia "Reli" Jadrny (29 July 1922 – 2 August 1998) on 20 October 1945, in Mürzsteg, Styria, then in Allied-occupied Austria. They later had two sons, Meinhard and Arnold. Meinhard died on 20 May 1971 in a solo car accident while driving drunk on a mountain road at age 24; Meinhard was survived by his son, Patrick Knapp Schwarzenegger.

Gustav Schwarzenegger died of a stroke on 13 December 1972, at the age of 65, in Weiz, Styria, Austria, where he had been transferred as a policeman. While visiting Weiz Cemetery in August 1998, where her husband was buried, Aurelia Jadrny Schwarzenegger died of a heart attack at the age of 76; she is buried next to him. Their son, Arnold, stated in the film Pumping Iron that he did not attend his father's funeral, but the film's director, George Butler, later said that it was a story Arnold had appropriated from a boxer, to make it appear as though he could prevent his personal life from interfering with his athletic training.

News reports about Schwarzenegger's Nazi links first surfaced in 1990, at which time Arnold Schwarzenegger asked the Simon Wiesenthal Center, an organization he had long supported, to research his father's past. The Center found his father's army records and Nazi party membership, but did not uncover any connection to war crimes or the paramilitary organization, the Schutzstaffel (SS). Media interest resurfaced when Arnold ran for Governor of California in the state's 2003 recall election.

In his 2012 memoir, Arnold puts forth an account in which Gustav disapproved of him and viewed his weight training as "garbage".

In a 2021 video made in response to the January 6 United States Capitol attack, his son Arnold publicly recalled, how Gustav was frequently drunk and abusive to his family when Arnold was young. He attributed this behavior to guilt and shame over what Gustav and other Nazis and collaborators had perpetrated or enabled during the war. His son brought up the war's impact on Gustav again in a 2022 video about the Russian invasion of Ukraine, in which he urged the Russian soldiers to discontinue their invasion in order not to "be broken like [his] father".
