= The Comeback (1980 film) =

- Directed by: Kit Laughlin
- Produced by: Paul Graham; Geoff Bennett
- Starring: Arnold Schwarzenegger; Tom Platz
- Cinematography: Andrew Lesnie
- Release date: 1980
- Running time: 78 minutes
- Country: Australia
- Language: English

The Comeback is a 1980 Australian documentary film directed by Kit Laughlin and starring Arnold Schwarzenegger. It follows Schwarzenegger as he returns to professional bodybuilding to compete in the 1980 Mr Olympia to regain the title for the 7th time.

== Reception ==
Allmovie gave the film 2 out of 5 stars.
