= Chester Yorton =

American bodybuilder (1939–2020)

- ♂ Professional bodybuilder

Personal info
- Nickname: Chet Yorton
- Born: June 1, 1939; Stevens Point, Wisconsin, U.S.
- Died: 21 November 2020 (aged 81)

Best statistics

Chester Yorton (June 1, 1939 – November 21, 2020) also known as Chet Yorton, was an American bodybuilder.

== Early life ==
Yorton was born in 1940. While not athletic during his youth, Yorton was in a life-threatening auto accident in high school. He sustained several severe cuts and shattered bones in his pelvis, legs, and elbow. One of his legs was to be amputated but doctors were able to save it with a metal plate. His doctors agreed he could rehabilitate himself with light weight training from his wheelchair.

== Career ==
He defeated Arnold Schwarzenegger at the 1966 NABBA Mr. Universe (amateur) held in London.

He became known as "The Father of Natural Bodybuilding" for his advocacy of steroid-free bodybuilding.

== Personal life ==
On December 4, 2020, Yorton's daughter Shannan revealed on her social media both of her parents had died two weeks prior. She wrote her father had discovered her mother dead from unknown causes, and he died from a heart attack a few days later. Vicki was 78; Yorton was 81.
